= J.J. Beijnes =

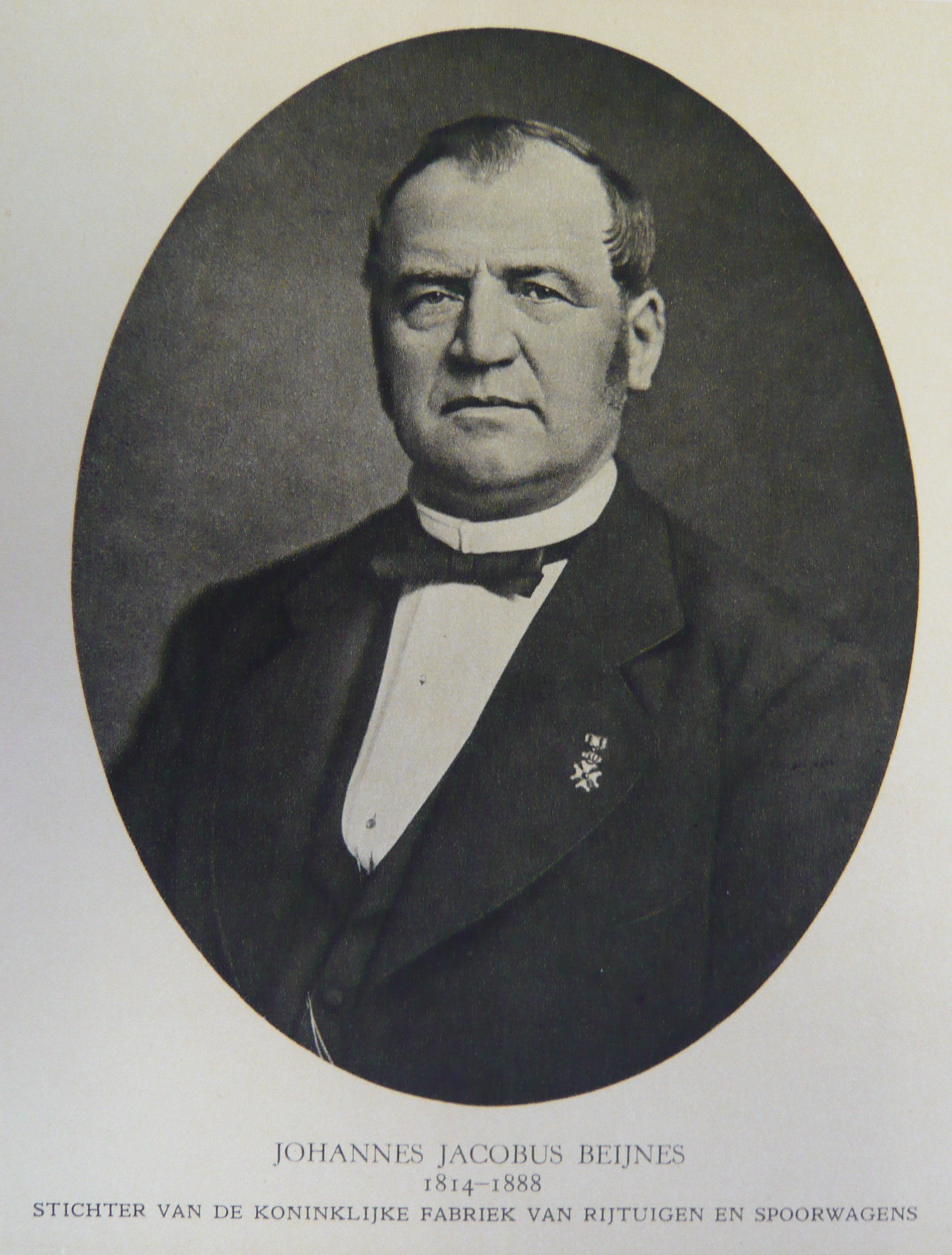
Johannes Jacobus Beijnes 1814-1888

Johannes Jacobus, or J.J. Beijnes (Haarlem, 9-6-1814 – Haarlem, 5-3-1888) was a Dutch businessman and entrepreneur who, along with his brother Antonie Johannes (A.J.) Beijnes, was credited with growing the Haarlem factory Beijnes into an international manufacturer of train and tram wagons.

== Biography ==
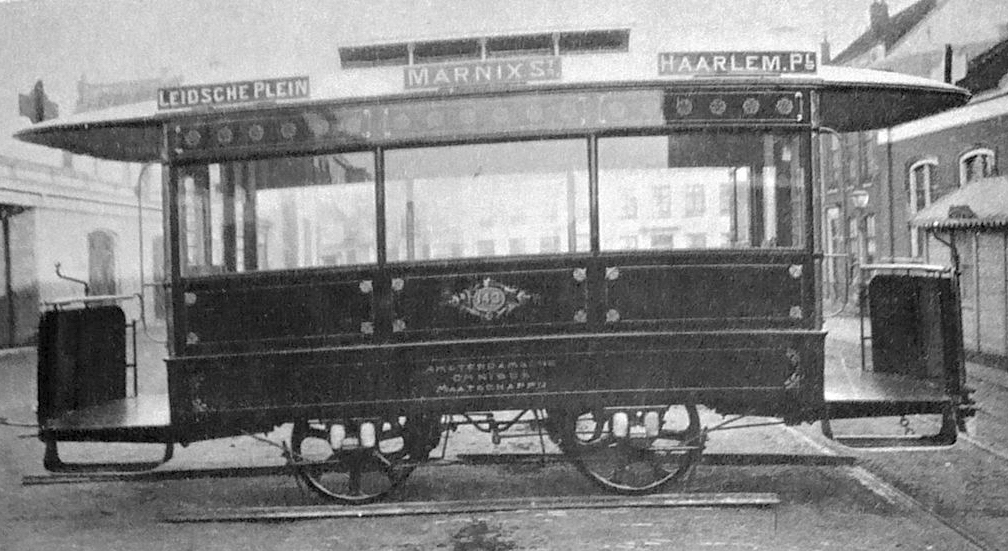
Omnibus built for the Amsterdam Omnibus Maatschappij in 1883

He was the son of J.J. Beijnes the elder who had a carriage shop behind the St. Bavochurch on the Riviervischmarkt in Haarlem. Both he and his brother went to work for his father, though young A.J. became an independent smith in the Grote Houtstraat at number 179. In 1853 both companies were merged, and in 1858 the company's name was changed to Fabriek van Rijtuigen en Spoorwagens J.J. Beijnes when they moved premises to what is now Stationsplein, Haarlem in order to serve their largest customer, the Hollandsche IJzeren Spoorweg-Maatschappij (HIJSM). To service the trains on the rails between Haarlem and Amsterdam, the HIJSM took on the services of the Fabriek van Rijtuigen en Spoorwagens J.J. Beijnes in Haarlem as sole supplier. The locomotive engines were imported, but all of the train cars were built by Beijnes. The company grew so fast, that in 1891, the HIJSM, aided by the social activist Daniel de Clercq, began the Haarlem society called De Ambachtsschool to unify various city efforts to start a vocational school in Haarlem, in order to satisfy their need for workers in the booming train car business.

The J.J. Beijnes carriage factory was in operation for 125 years from 1838 to 1963, and it built and serviced horse carriages (omnibusses), trams, and trains, based at Stationsplein, Haarlem, Netherlands. Today that land is used as a bus station across from the Haarlem railway station, and all that remains is a sports hall and parking garage with the name Beijnes.
