= Abraham Capadose =

Dutch physician and writer

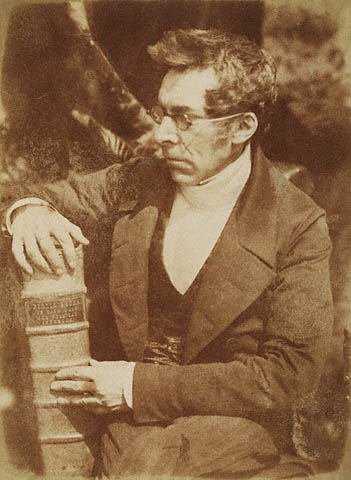
- Abraham Capadose, by Hill & Adamson, 1843 - 1847
- Born: 22 August 1795; Amsterdam
- Died: 16 December 1874 (aged 79); The Hague
- Education: University of Leiden
- Spouses: 1)1829-1836: Adriana van der Houven; 2)1839-1874: Hendrika Jacoba Abrahamsz
- Children: Three
- Parent(s): Isaac Haim Capadose and Esther Mendes da Costa
- Church: Dutch Reformed Church and Free Church of Scotland (1822-66), Non-denominational (1866-74)

The Revd Dr Abraham Capadose or Capadoce (22 August 1795, Amsterdam – 16 December 1874, The Hague) was a Dutch medical doctor and Calvinist writer. A Jewish convert to Christianity from 1822 onwards, he was part of the Dutch Réveil circle that also included Isaac da Costa and Willem de Clercq.

== Life ==
=== Youth ===
He was born to the wine merchant Isaac Haim Capadose and Esther Mendes da Costa (both from prominent Portuguese-Jewish families). In 1796 the position of the Jews in the Netherlands was - at least in the social respect - considerably improved by the middle-class equalization. The Capadose family forms a good example of an emancipated and finally assimilated family.

Little is known of Abraham's youth, except that he was a good pupil of the Latin School. After two years at the Amsterdam Athenaeum studying medicine, he went to the University of Leiden. After four years' study, he graduated as a medical doctor in 1818 and set up as a physician in Amsterdam.

=== Conversion ===
During his time at Leiden, where he stayed with his uncle, the well-known physician Immanuel Capadoce, Capadose came more and more under the influence of the well-known speaker - and conservative in the arts - Willem Bilderdijk. Thus the young Capadose - together with men such as Isaac da Costa and the brothers Willem and Dirk van Hogendorp - heard the history course that Bilderdijk gave as private instruction. Influenced by Bilderdijk and eventually to a greater extent by Da Costa, Capadose converted to Christianity. Together with Da Costa, Capadose had studied the Bible and, like da Costa, had become convinced that Jesus of Nazareth was the Messiah predicted in the Old Testament. Abraham, da Costa and da Costa's wife converted to Christianity and were baptised at the Pieterskerk in Leiden on October 20, 1822.

=== Later life ===
In 1829, Capadose married Adriana van der Houven. From this marriage, three children were born. In 1831, Capadose set up in Scherpenzeel before, two years later, moving to the Hague, where he remained for the rest of his life (barring a one-year trip to Switzerland in 1836/37, during which his wife died). In September 1837 he returned to the Netherlands, where in 1839 he married a second time, with Hendrika Jacoba Abrahamsz - she would survive him.

Just like Bilderdijk, De Clercq and Da Costa, Abraham Capadose belonged to the circle of the Dutch Revival movement. This circle resisted the revolutionary and liberal minds and democratic ideas of their time - democracy was, in Capadose's eyes, an act of resistance against the Creator. Capadose is also notorious as a fanatical and outspoken adversary of cowpox vaccination, following in the steps of the conservative Willem Bilderdijk. In 1866, Capadose left the Dutch Reformed Church, seeing it as not strict enough, and for the rest of his life attached himself to no particular religious community.

== Writing ==
Among Capadose's writings the most noteworthy are: (1) Aan Mijne Geloofsgenooten in de Ned. Hebr. Gem. The Hague, 1843; (2) Overdenkingen over Israel's Roeping en Toekomst, Amsterdam, 1843; (3) Rome en Jerusalem, Utrecht, 1851.
