= Willem de Clercq =

Dutch writer and businessman (1795–1844)

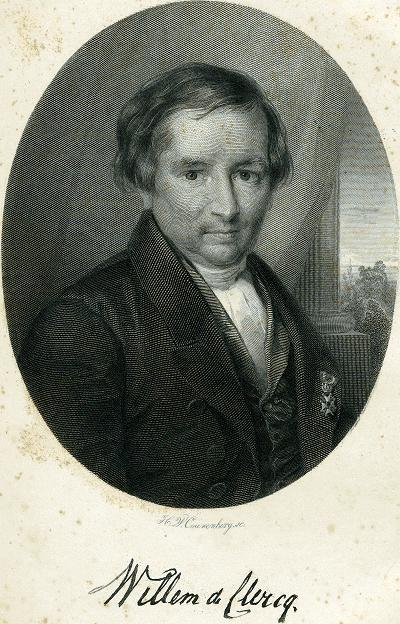
- Born: 15 January 1795; Amsterdam
- Died: 4 February 1844 (aged 49)
- Relatives: Daniel de Clercq (grandson)

Willem de Clercq (15 January 1795 – 4 February 1844) was a poet and leader of the Réveil, the Protestant Church Revival in the Netherlands. He is known for his diary entries, which contain extensive reports of the events he witnessed. He was also a secretary (1824-1831) and later a director (1831–1844) of the Netherlands Trading Society (Nederlandsche Handel-Maatschappij or NHM).

== Personal life ==
Willem de Clercq was born in Amsterdam to a wealthy Amsterdam Mennonite family of grain merchants. His father was Gerrit de Clercq and his mother was Maria de Vos. In 1801, he began to write notes about various events he encountered in his life, which later formed a diary, Dagboek (autobiography), with a total of 36,000 pages that he kept from the year 1811 until his death. Planning to be a preacher in the Netherlands, he learned German, French, and Greek. However, due to Napoleon's invasion of 1813, he was displaced - events which are described in Dagboek.

In 1816, De Clercq traveled to Saint Petersburg to report on the landscape and the social and cultural life in the northern German and Baltic ports. After the death of his father in 1817, he returned home to manage the family business. De Clercq married Caroline Boissevain (1799–1879) in 1817, and they had several children, including Gerrit de Clercq, who later became the editor of De Gids. Around 1820, the business suffered from a grain shortage crisis from which it never fully recovered.

Around that time, De Clercq met Jewish convert Isaäc da Costa, and there began a deep friendship. De Clercq converted to Orthodox Calvinism under Da Costa's influence. Together with Willem Bilderdijk, Abraham Capadose, Guillaume Groen van Prinsterer, Samuel Iperusz Wiselius, and others, they became the leaders of the Réveil.

De Clercq left the failing family business and traveled to The Hague to become secretary of the Netherlands Trading Society (NHM) in 1824. There he began attending the Reformed-Walloon churches. As a manager of the NHM, he had a large influence on the growing textile industry in Twente. Influenced by Thomas Ainsworth, he became involved in establishing industries in the town of Nijverdal. He wanted his work to reflect his beliefs such as employing small-scale industries rather than large factories as the latter caused harm to the workers. De Clercq was a supporter of the NHM, dividing organisational orders evenly across as many producers as possible in order to accomplish the work at a low price.

In the last years of his life, De Clercq's views diverged from those of Da Costa and were increasingly influenced by Hermann Friedrich Kohlbrugge. As a result, he withdrew more and more from social and cultural life, as opposed to Da Costa's active involvement in city life.

De Clercq died suddenly after months of severe depression. Some historians blame Kohlbrugge's dominating views for De Clercq's death, whilst others blame De Clercq's own idealistic and emotional character.

As a poet, De Clercq was especially well known for improvising. He was able to recite a poem without preparation at a moment's notice.

In both Amsterdam and Twente, there are streets named after him. His grandson Daniel de Clercq became an advocate of labor and educational reform.

== Works ==
- Verzameling De Clercq (onder andere Particuliere aantekeningen/Dagboek) in: Réveil-Archief, Universiteitsbibliotheek, Universiteit van Amsterdam
- Woelige weken. November–December 1813 – Amsterdam 1988 (uitgegeven dagboekaantekeningen)
- Graan en reizen. Willem de Clercq in 1814 – Amsterdam 1995 (uitgegeven dagboekaantekeningen)
- Per karos naar Sint-Petersburg – Lochem 1962 (uitgegeven dagboekaantekeningen)
- Opvoeding. Verschillende byzonderheden over de opvoeding van Gerrit, Daan, Steven en Gideon – 1831
- Rapport eener reize naar de Fabrieken van Overijssel – 1832
- Briefwisseling tusschen Willem de Clercq en Isaäc da Costa. Bloemlezing uit onuitgegeven brieven berustende in het Réveil-archief te Amsterdam – Baarn 1938
- Willem de Clercq naar zijn dagboek – Amsterdam 1888

== Bibliography ==
- W.A. de Clercq – Willem de Clercq (1795–1844) – Amsterdam 1999
- I. da Costa – Herinneringen uit het leven en den omgang van Willem de Clercq – Amsterdam 1850
- C.E. te Lintum – Willem de Clercq. De mensch en zijn strijd – Utrecht 1938
- M.H. Schenkeveld – Willem de Clercq en de literatuur – Groningen 1962
- O.W. Dubois – Een vriendschap in réveilkring. De omgang tussen Isaäc da Costa en Willem de Clercq (1820–1844) – Heerenveen 1997
