= Christian revival =

Increased interest or renewal in a church

A Christian revival is a period of intensified religious activity within churches that can influence communities on a local, national, or global scale. From a Christian perspective, it has been described as "a period of unusual blessing and activity in the life of the Christian Church". Proponents view revivals as the restoration of the Church to a vital and fervent relationship with God after a period of moral decline, instigated by God, as opposed to an evangelistic campaign.

Historically, Christian revivals have generated lasting institutional and theological change. They have frequently given rise to new traditions or denominations; for example, Methodism emerged from the Church of England during the Evangelical Revival (or Great Awakening) of the 18th century. Revivals may also stimulate missionary expansion, and renewed patterns of worship and piety within existing churches.

== Revivals within modern church history ==
Within Christian studies the concept of revival is derived from biblical narratives of national decline and restoration during the history of the Israelites. In particular, narrative accounts of the Kingdoms of Israel and Judah emphasise periods of national decline and revival associated with the rule of wicked or righteous kings, respectively. Josiah is notable within this biblical narrative as a figure who reinstituted temple worship of Yahweh while destroying pagan worship. Within modern church history, church historians have identified and debated the effects of various national revivals in the history of the US and other countries. During the 18th and 19th centuries, American society experienced a number of "Awakenings" around the years 1727, 1792, 1830, 1857 and 1882. More recent revivals in the 20th century include the 1904–1905 Welsh Revival, 1906 (Azusa Street Revival), 1930s (Balokole), 1970s (Jesus people), 1971 Bario Revival and 1909 Chile Revival which spread in the Americas, Africa, and Asia among both Protestants and Catholics.

== 17th century ==
Many Christian revivals drew inspiration from the missionary work of early monks, from the 16th-century Protestant Reformation (and Catholic Counter-Reformation) and from the uncompromising stance of the Covenanters in 17th-century Scotland and Ulster that came to Virginia and Pennsylvania with Presbyterians and other non-conformists. Its character formed part of the mental framework that led to the American War of Independence and the Civil War.

== 18th century ==
The 18th-century Age of Enlightenment had two camps: those who identified humans as only intellectual beings, Rationalists, and those who believed humans to be only passionate beings, followers of Romanticism. The philosophy of Earl of Shaftesbury III led to a proto-Romanticism that mixed with Christian worship to produce a tertium quid. The Methodist revival of John Wesley, Charles Wesley and George Whitefield in England and Daniel Rowland, Howel Harris and William Williams Pantycelyn in Wales and the Great Awakening in America prior to the Revolution. Other notable figues included Samuel Davies who fought for religious toleration from the Church of England. A similar (but smaller scale) revival in Scotland took place at Cambuslang (then a village), and is known as the Cambuslang Work.

=== American colonies ===
In the American colonies, the First Great Awakening was a wave of religious enthusiasm among Protestants that swept the American colonies in the 1730s and 1740s, leaving a permanent impact on American religion. It resulted from powerful preaching that deeply affected listeners (already church members) with a deep sense of personal guilt and salvation by Christ. Pulling away from ancient ritual and ceremony, the Great Awakening made religion intensely emotive to the average person by creating a deep sense of spiritual guilt and redemption. Historian Sydney E. Ahlstrom sees it as part of a "great international Protestant upheaval" that also created Pietism in Germany, the Evangelical Revival and Methodism in England. It brought Christianity to enslaved Americans and was a ground-breaking event in New England that challenged established authority. It incited rancor and division between the traditionalists who argued for ritual and doctrine and the revivalists who ignored or sometimes avidly contradicted doctrine, e.g. George Whitfield's being denied a pulpit in Anglican Churches after denying Anglican Doctrine. Its democratic features had a major impact in shaping the Congregational, Presbyterian, Dutch Reformed, and German Reformed denominations, and strengthened the small Baptist and Methodist denominations. It had little impact on Anglicans and Quakers. Unlike the Second Great Awakening that began about 1800 and which reached out to non-believers, the First Great Awakening focused on people who were already church members. It changed their rituals, their piety, and their self-awareness.

== 19th century ==
=== Transylvania ===
The Hungarian Baptist Church sprung out of revival with the perceived liberalism of the Hungarian Reformed Church during the late 1800s. Many thousands of people were baptized in a revival that was led primarily by uneducated laymen, the so-called "peasant prophets".

=== Britain ===
During the 18th century, England saw a series of Methodist revivalist campaigns that stressed the tenets of faith set forth by John Wesley and that were conducted in accordance with a careful strategy. In addition to stressing the evangelist combination of "Bible, cross, conversion, and activism," the revivalist movement of the 19th century made efforts toward a universal appeal – rich and poor, urban and rural, and men and women. Special efforts were made to attract children and to generate literature to spread the revivalist message.

Gobbett (1997) discusses the usefulness of historian Elie Halévy's thesis explaining why England did not undergo a social revolution in the period 1790–1832, a time that appeared ripe for violent social upheaval. Halévy suggested that a politically conservative Methodism forestalled revolution among the largely uneducated working class by redirecting its energies toward spiritual rather than temporal affairs. The thesis has engendered strong debate among historians, and several have adopted and modified Halévy's thesis. Some historians, such as Robert Wearmouth, suggest that evangelical revivalism directed working-class attention toward moral regeneration, not social radicalism. Others, including E. P. Thompson, claim that Methodism, though a small movement, had a politically regressive effect on efforts for reform. Some historians question the Halévy thesis. Eric Hobsbawm claims that Methodism was not a large enough movement to have been able to prevent revolution. Alan Gilbert suggests that Methodism's supposed antiradicalism has been misunderstood by historians, suggesting that it was seen as a socially deviant movement and the majority of Methodists were moderate radicals.

Early in the 19th century the Scottish minister Thomas Chalmers had an important influence on the evangelical revival movement. Chalmers began life as a moderate in the Church of Scotland and an opponent of evangelicalism. During the winter of 1803–04, he presented a series of lectures that outlined a reconciliation of the apparent incompatibility between the Genesis account of creation and the findings of the developing science of geology. However, by 1810 he had become an evangelical and eventually led the Disruption of 1843 that resulted in the formation of the Free Church of Scotland.

The Plymouth Brethren started with John Nelson Darby at this time, a result of disillusionment with denominationalism and clerical hierarchy.

The established churches too, were influenced by the evangelical revival. In 1833 a group of Anglican clergymen led by John Henry Newman and John Keble began the Oxford Movement. However its objective was to renew the Church of England by reviving certain Roman Catholic doctrines and rituals, thus distancing themselves as far as possible from evangelical enthusiasm.

=== Australia ===
Many say that Australia has never been visited by a genuine religious revival as in other countries, but that is not entirely true. The effect of the Great Awakening of 1858–59 was also felt in Australia fostered mainly by the Methodist Church. Records show that the Methodist Church grew by a staggering 72% between 1857 and 1864, while the Baptists, Anglicans, Presbyterians and other evangelicals also benefited. Evangelical fervor was its height during the 1920s with visiting evangelists, R. A. Torrey, Wilbur J. Chapman, Charles M. Alexander and others winning many converts in their Crusades. The Crusades of the American evangelist Billy Graham in the 1950s had significant impact on Australian Churches. Stuart Piggin (1988) explores the development and tenacity of the evangelical movement in Australia, and its impact on Australian society. Evangelicalism arrived from Britain as an already mature movement characterized by commonly shared attitudes toward doctrine, spiritual life, and sacred history. Any attempt to periodize the history of the movement in Australia should examine the role of revivalism and the oscillations between emphases on personal holiness and social concerns.

=== Scandinavia ===
Historians have examined the revival movements in Scandinavia, with special attention to the growth of organizations, church history, missionary history, social class and religion, women in religious movements, religious geography, the lay movements as counter culture, ethnology, and social force. Some historians approach it as a cult process since the revivalist movements tend to rise and fall. Others study it as minority discontent with the status quo or, after the revivalists gain wide acceptance, as a majority that tends to impose its own standards. The Grundtvigian and Home Mission revival movements arose in Denmark after 1860 and reshaped religion in that country, and among immigrants to America.

Norway saw several prominent revival movements within Orthodox Lutheranism stemming from the Pietistic preaching of Hans Nielsen Hauge and dogmatician Gisle Johnson, the latter of which started the movement known as the Johnsonian Revivals. The lasting importance of Hauge's revivals was threefold: 1. the introduction of revivalism as a prominent feature of Norwegian spiritual life, 2. the introduction of lay preaching as a common practice, and 3. institution of conventicles, or non-sanctioned congregational gatherings. The second wave of revivals, called the Johnsonian Revivals, largely expanded the pietistic emphases of Hauge via the Inner Mission Society as spearheaded by Gisle Johnson, which revolved around lay preaching and Bible study, increased spiritual literacy via the distribution of Christian literature, and the alleviation of the impoverished conditions of the quickly-industrializing Norway of the nineteenth century. The Johnsonian Revivals would go on to influence the Norwegian church mission societies abroad, spanning Africa, the Middle East, and Asia.

=== United States 1800–1850 ===
In the United States, the Second Great Awakening (1800–1830s) was the second great religious revival in the country's history and consisted of renewed personal salvation experienced in revival meetings. Major leaders included Asahel Nettleton, James Brainerd Taylor, Charles Grandison Finney, Lyman Beecher, Barton Stone, Alexander Campbell, Peter Cartwright and James B. Finley.

Rev. Charles Finney (1792–1875) was a key leader of the evangelical revival movement in America. From 1821 onward he conducted revival meetings across many north-eastern states and won many converts. For him, a revival was not a miracle but a change of mindset that was ultimately a matter of an individual's free will. His revival meetings created anxiety in a penitent's mind that their soul could only be saved by submission to the will of God, as illustrated by Finney's quotations from the Bible. Finney also conducted revival meetings in England, first in 1849 and later to England and Scotland in 1858–59.

In New England, the renewed interest in religion inspired a wave of social activism, including abolitionism.

In the West (now the Upper South), especially in Cane Ridge, Kentucky. and Tennessee, the revival strengthened the Methodists and Baptists. The Churches of Christ and Christian Church (Disciples of Christ) arose from the Stone-Campbell Restoration Movement. It also introduced a new form of religious expression to America: the Scottish camp meeting.

=== Europe: Le Réveil ===
A movement in Swiss, eastern French, German, and Dutch Protestant history known as le Réveil (German: die Erweckung, Dutch: Het Reveil). Le Réveil was a revival of Protestant Christianity along conservative evangelical lines at a time when rationalism had taken a strong hold in the churches on the continent of Europe.

In German-speaking Europe, Lutheran Johann Georg Hamann (1730–1788) was a leader in the new wave of evangelicalism, the Erweckung, which spread across the land, cross-fertilizing with British movements.

The movement began in the Francophone world in connection with a circle of pastors and seminarians at French-speaking Protestant theological seminaries in Geneva, Switzerland and Montauban, France, influenced inter alia by the visit of Scottish Christian Robert Haldane in 1816–17. The circle included such figures as Merle D'Aubigne, César Malan, Felix Neff, and the Monod brothers.

As these men traveled, the movement spread to Lyon and Paris in France, Berlin and Eberfeld in Germany, and the Netherlands. Several missionary societies were founded to support the work, such as the British-based Continental Society and the indigenous Geneva Evangelical Society. The Réveil also inspired the International Committee of the Red Cross, which was established in Geneva in 1863 by a group of young professional followers of the movement.

As well as supporting existing Protestant denominations, in France and Germany the movement led to the creation of Free Evangelical Church groupings: the Union des Églises évangéliques libres and Bund Freier evangelischer Gemeinden in Deutschland.

In the Netherlands the movement was taken forward by Willem Bilderdijk, with Isaäc da Costa, Abraham Capadose, Samuel Iperusz Wiselius, Willem de Clercq and Groen van Prinsterer as his pupils. The movement was politically influential and actively involved in improving society, and – at the end of the 19th century – brought about anti-revolutionary and Christian historical parties.

At the same time in Britain figures such as William Wilberforce and Thomas Chalmers were active, although they are not considered to be part of the Le Reveil movement.

=== 1850–1900 ===
In North America the Third Great Awakening began in 1857 onwards in Canada and spread throughout the English-speaking world including America and Australia. Significant names include Dwight L. Moody, Ira D. Sankey, William Booth and Catherine Booth (founders of the Salvation Army), Charles Spurgeon and James Caughey. Hudson Taylor began the China Inland Mission and Thomas John Barnardo founded his famous orphanages.

One representative was Rev. James Caughey, an American sent by the Wesleyan Methodist Church to Canada from the 1840s through 1864. He brought in converts by the score, most notably in the revivals in Canada West 1851–53. His technique combined restrained emotionalism with a clear call for personal commitment, coupled with follow-up action to organize support from converts. It was a time when the Holiness Movement caught fire, with the revitalized interest of men and women in Christian perfection. Caughey successfully bridged the gap between the style of earlier camp meetings and the needs of more sophisticated Methodist congregations in the emerging cities.

In England, the Keswick Convention movement began out of the British Holiness movement, encouraging a lifestyle of holiness, unity and prayer.

==== 1857–1860 revival in America ====
On 21 September 1857 businessman Jeremiah Lanphier began a series of prayer meetings in New York. By the beginning of 1858 the congregation was crowded, often with a majority of businessmen. Newspapers reported that over 6,000 were attending various prayer meetings in New York, and 6,000 in Pittsburgh. Daily prayer meetings were held in Washington, D.C. at 5 different times to accommodate the crowds. Other cities followed the pattern. Soon, a common mid-day sign on business premises read, "We will re-open at the close of the prayer meeting". By May, 50,000 of New York's 800,000 people were new converts.

Finney wrote of this revival, "This winter of 1857–58 will be remembered as the time when a great revival prevailed. It swept across the land with such power that at the time it was estimated that not less than 50,000 conversions occurred weekly."

=== Britain and Ireland ===
In 1857, four young Irishmen began a weekly prayer meeting in the village of Connor, near Ballymena. See also Ahoghill. The meeting is generally regarded as the origin of the 1859 Ulster Revival that swept through most of the towns and villages throughout Ulster and in due course brought 100,000 converts into the churches. It was also ignited by a young preacher, Henry Grattan Guinness, who drew thousands at a time to hear his preaching. So great was the interest in the American movement that in 1858, the Presbyterian General Assembly meeting in Derry appointed two of their ministers, Dr. William Gibson and Rev. William McClure to visit North America. Upon their return the two deputies had many public opportunities to bear testimony to what they had witnessed of the remarkable outpouring of the Spirit across the Atlantic, and to fan the flames in their homeland yet further. Such was the strength of emotion generated by the preachers' oratory that many made spontaneous confessions seeking to be relieved of their burdens of sin. Others suffered complete nervous breakdown.

== 20th century ==
The third Great Awakening (1904 onwards) had its roots in the holiness movement, which had developed in the late 19th century. The Pentecostal revival movement began, out of a passion for more power and a greater outpouring of the Holy Spirit. In 1902, the American evangelists Reuben Archer Torrey and Charles McCallon Alexander conducted meetings in Melbourne, Australia, resulting in more than 8,000 converts. News of this revival travelled fast, igniting a passion for prayer and an expectation that God would work in similar ways elsewhere.

Torrey and Alexander were involved in the beginnings of the great Welsh revival (1904).

In 1906 the modern Pentecostal movement was born in Azusa Street, in Los Angeles.

=== Melanesia ===
The rebaibal, as it is known in Tok Pisin, had begun in the Solomon Islands and reached the Urapmin people by 1977. The Urapmin were particularly zealous in rejecting their traditional beliefs, and adopted a form of Charismatic Christianity based on Baptist Christianity. The Urapmin innovated the practices of spirit possession (known as the "spirit disko") and ritualized confessions, the latter being especially atypical for Protestantism.

=== Wales ===
The Welsh revival was not an isolated religious movement but very much a part of Britain's modernization. The revival began in the fall of 1904 under the leadership of Evan Roberts (1878–1951), a 26-year-old former collier and minister-in-training. The revival lasted less than a year, but in that period 100,000 converts were made. Begun as an effort to kindle nondenominational, nonsectarian spirituality, the Welsh revival of 1904–05 coincided with the rise of the labor movement, socialism, and a general disaffection with religion among the working class and youths. Placed in context, the short-lived revival appears as both a climax for Nonconformism and a flashpoint of change in Welsh religious life. The movement spread to Scotland and England, with estimates that a million people were converted in Britain. Missionaries subsequently carried the movement abroad; it was especially influential on the Pentecostal movement emerging in California.

Unlike earlier religious revivals that pivoted on powerful preaching, the revival of 1904–05 relied primarily on music and on paranormal phenomena as exemplified by the visions of Evan Roberts. The intellectual emphasis of the earlier revivals had left a dearth of religious imagery that the visions supplied. They also challenged the denial of the spiritual and miraculous element of scripture by opponents of the revival, who held liberal and critical theological positions. The structure and content of the visions not only repeated those of Scripture and earlier Christian mystical tradition but also illuminated the personal and social tensions that the revival addressed by juxtaposing biblical images with scenes familiar to contemporary Welsh believers.

=== Hebrides ===
The Hebrides Revival (1949-1957) started on the Isle of Lewis after the octogenerian sisters Peggy and Christine Smith, following a period of steadfast prayer were given an unshakeable conviction that revival was near. Peggy asked her minister, James Murray Mackay, to call the church leaders to prayer. Following some months of regular prayer, those who gathered one night in a barn to pray had a supernatural experience that overwhelmed them. Mackay invited Duncan Campbell (revivalist) to come to the island, and he was directed straight to an all-night prayer meeting. Campbell described the supernatural events that were beginning to happen:

"About a dozen men and women lay prostrate on the floor, speechless. Something had happened; we knew that the forces of darkness were going to be driven back, and men were going to be delivered. We left the cottage at 3am to discover men and women seeking God. I walked along a country road, and found three men on their faces, crying to God for mercy.".

Within days, the scenes spread to neighbouring parishes and to other Hebridean islands in the coming months and years, with crowds of islanders spontaneously feeling gripped with a conviction to attend the nearest church in repentance. Work ceased, and drinking houses closed as "men who until then had no thought of seeking after God, were suddenly arrested and became deeply concerned about their soul's salvation."

=== Korea ===
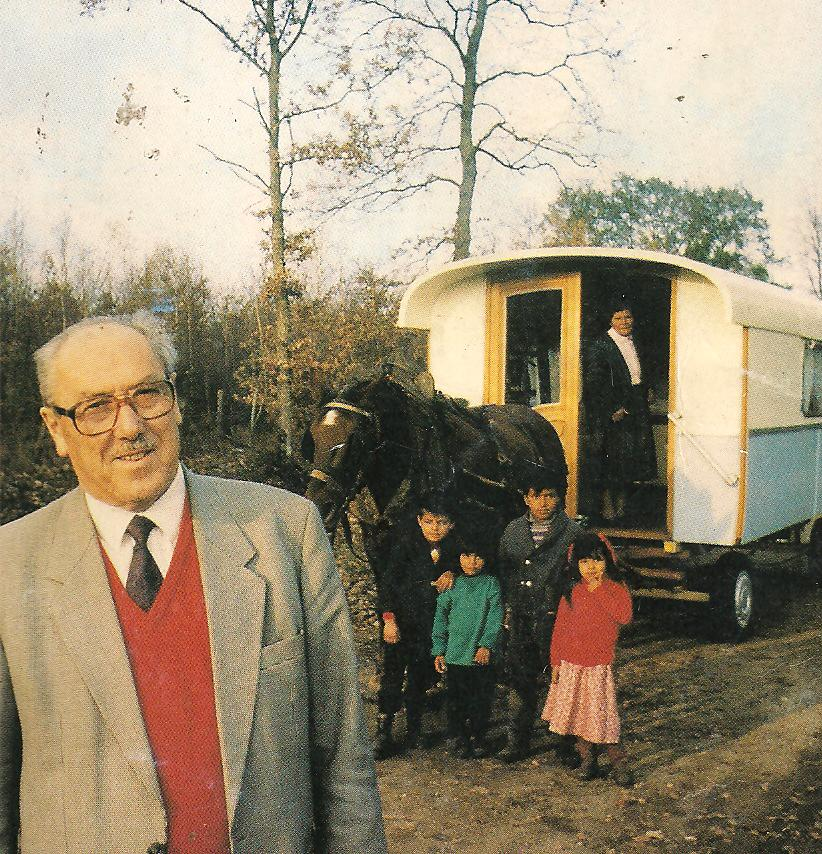
Pastor Clément Le Cossec, founder of the Gypsy Evangelical Mission in France was the catalyst for a major revival among marginalized populations such as the Roma, both in France and around the world.

The Pyongyang Great Revival (1907-1910) in what is now North Korea started when Protestantism was barely 20 years old in Korea. The effect was still strong in 1910.

=== France ===
In France, one finds, among others, the Gypsy Evangelical Mission in France, founded by the pastor Clément Le Cossec, who is highly influential in many countries. Le Cossec is nicknamed the apostle of Gypsies. Life and Light has more than 130,000 members in France alone.

== 21st century ==
Starting in February 2023, students at Asbury College, in Kentucky, United States, participated in the 2023 Asbury revival.

== See also ==
- First Great Awakening
- Second Great Awakening
- Third Great Awakening
- 1904–1905 Welsh Revival
- Brownsville Revival
- Church renewal
- Duncan Campbell (revivalist)
- Jonathan Edwards (theologian)
- Billy Graham
- Hans Nielsen Hauge
- Gisle Johnson
- Dwight L. Moody
- Asahel Nettleton
- Revival meeting
- Charles H. Spurgeon
- Billy Sunday
- Welsh Methodist revival
- George Whitefield
- Second Vatican Council
- Toronto Blessing
- New Calvinism
