= Mons Aurea, Garenkokerskade =

Coordinates: 52.3856°N 4.6299°E

Mons Aurea (ROC Nova College)
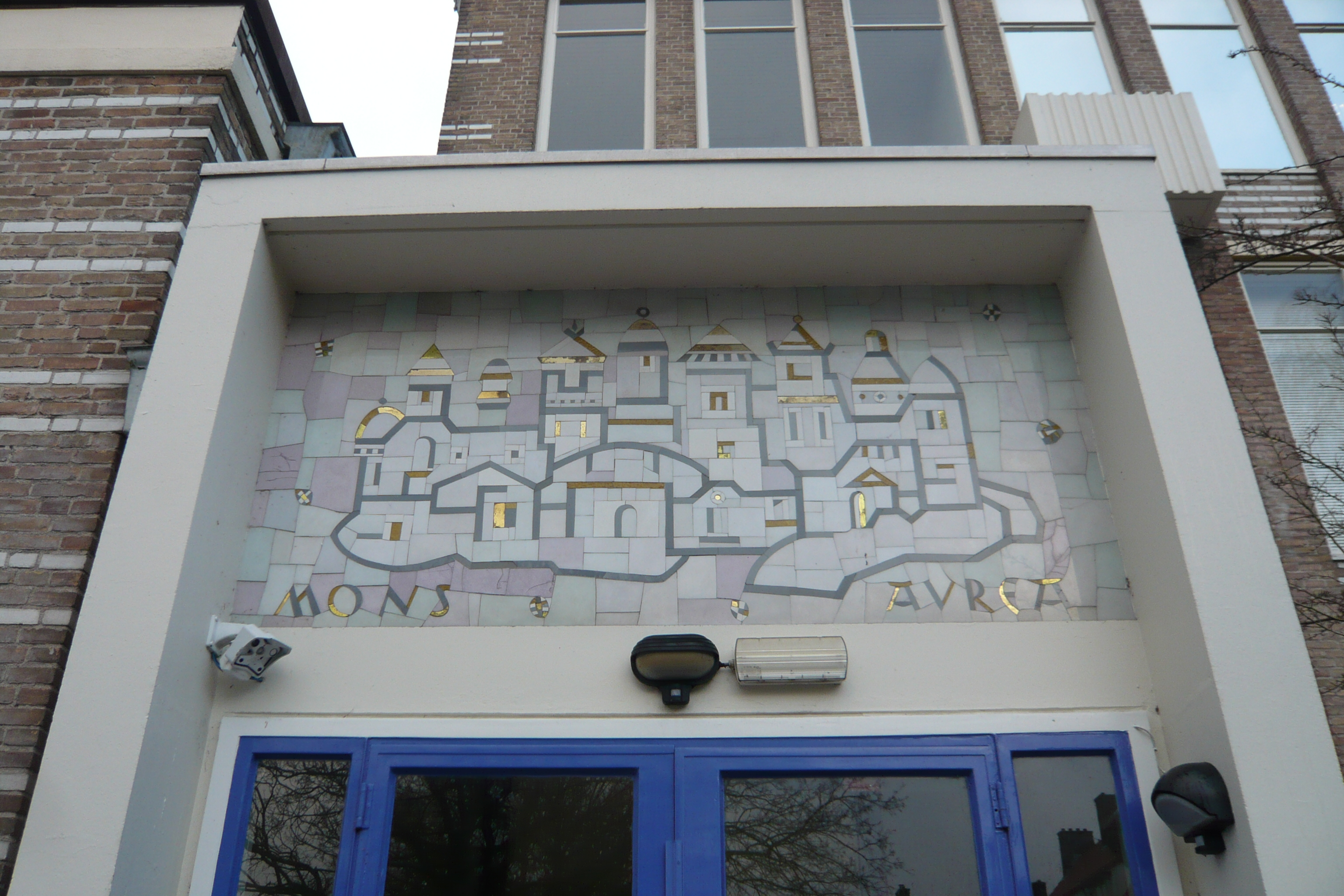
- Garenkokerskade 81, Haarlem, Netherlands

Information
- Type: Public Vocational school, Home economics school
- Motto: Built in 1960 by architect Jan van der Laan (1896-1966) and partners Th. M. van der Eerden, J. B. Hermans en J. H. M. Kirch to replace the former location that had become too small on the Gedempte Voldersgracht. It opened as the Catholic girls' school R.K. Huishoud- en Industrieschool Mons Aurea
- Established: 1919 (R.K. Huishoudschool);

Mons Aurea, or ROC Nova College is a middelbare school and former "huishoud school" on the Garenkokerskade, Haarlem, The Netherlands. It also offers various facilities for adult education.

== History ==
When the law for compulsory education (leerplicht) was passed in 1900 for children aged 6–12, the first local school for girls called Eerste Haarlemsche Huishoud- en Industrieschool was opened in 1901, just around the corner from the Ambachtsschool for boys on the Kamperstraat. The "Huishoud school" offered a three-year education and "extra classes". Some of the "extra class" names in the Household school were ‘nat en droogwaschen’ (wet and dry-cleaning), ‘strijken’ (ironing), ‘tafeldienen’ (waiting tables), ‘naaien van lijfgoed’ (sewing underwear) and ‘koken' (cooking) for workmen's wives. The extra classes were paid separately. For example the cooking class for children cost 1 guilder and fifty cents, but the meal could be eaten afterwards. The school was very popular, and a Catholic girls school was opened nearby on the Kleine Houtweg in 1914 called the R.K. Meisjes School. A catholic "huishoud school" was started in the same building in 1919, but moved to the Gedempte Voldersgracht where it stayed until 1960, when the current site at the Garenkokerskade was built. It was built in 1960 by architect Jan van der Laan (1896–1966) and partners Th. M. van der Eerden, J. B. Hermans en J. H. M. Kirch.

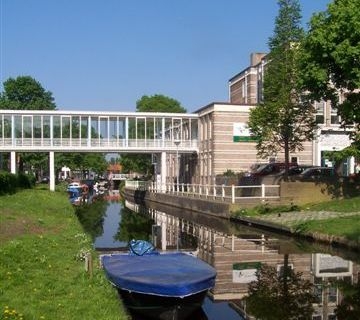
Bridge from gym to classrooms over the Garenkokerskade

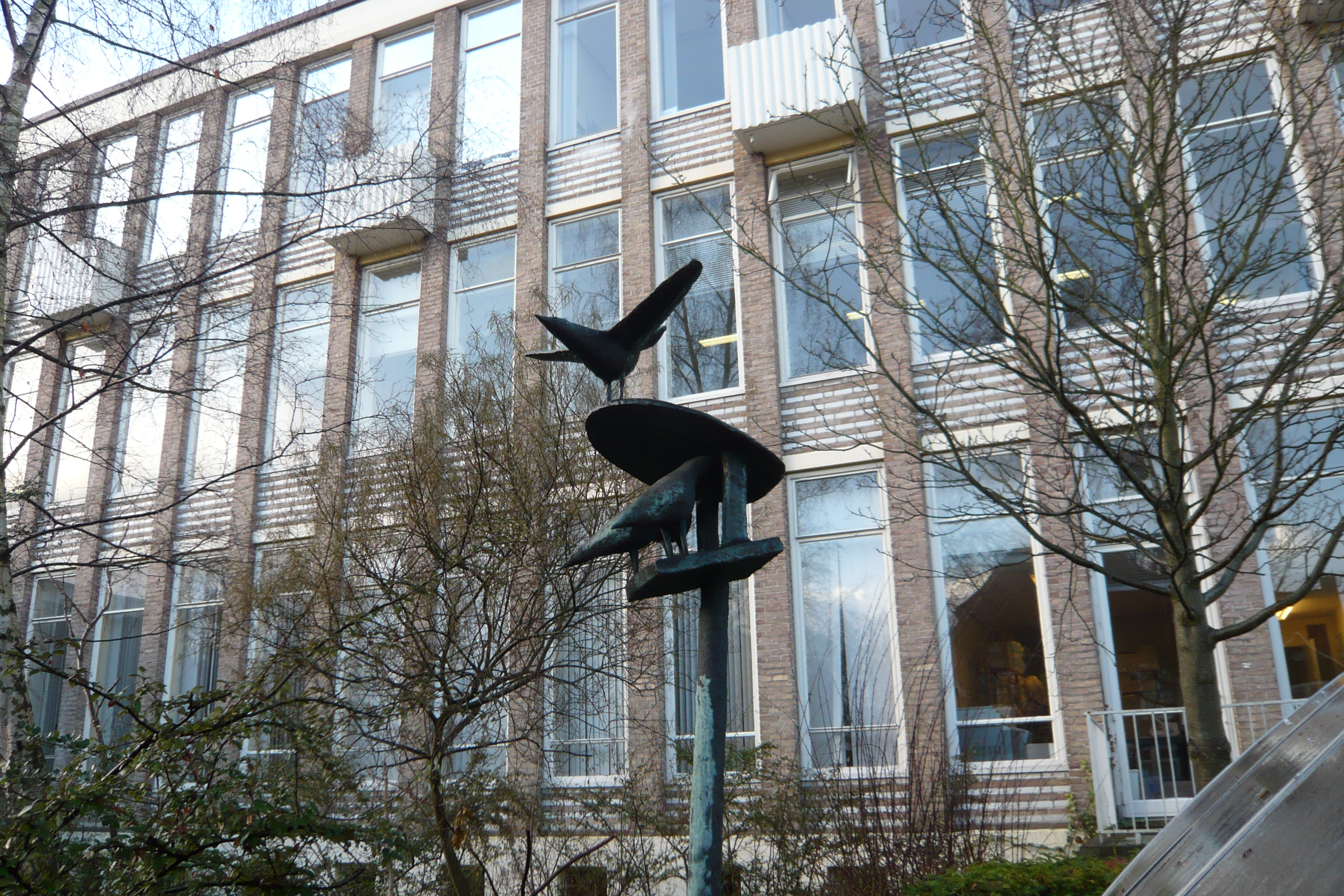
Front of building facing east

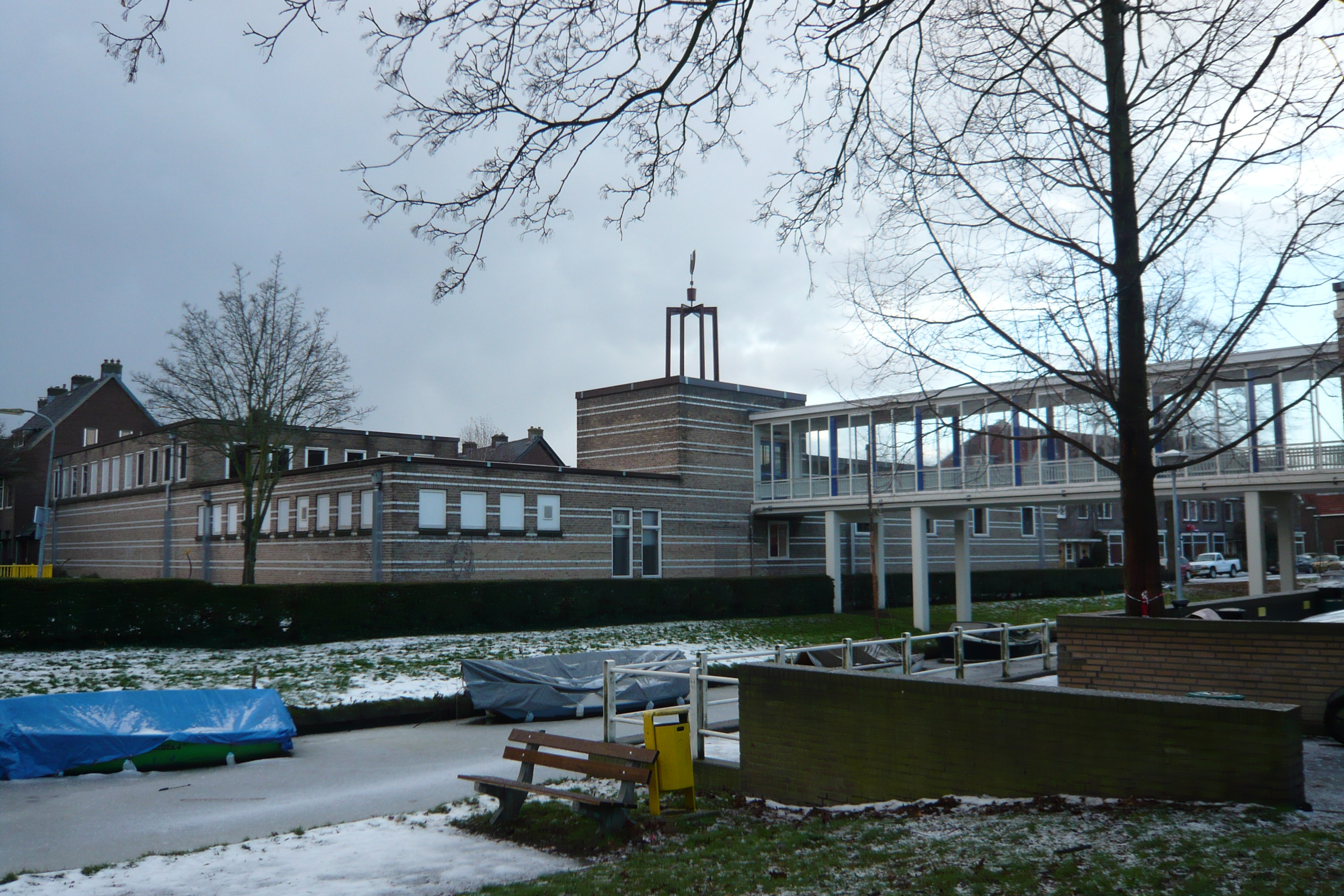
View from main entrance

In 2010 the school and its history was one of the subjects at the Historisch Museum Haarlem's exhibition "Leren voor het Leven" (learning for life), a compilation of materials from various vocational schools in the Haarlem area.
