= Herman Heijenbrock =

Dutch writer and painter (1871-1948)

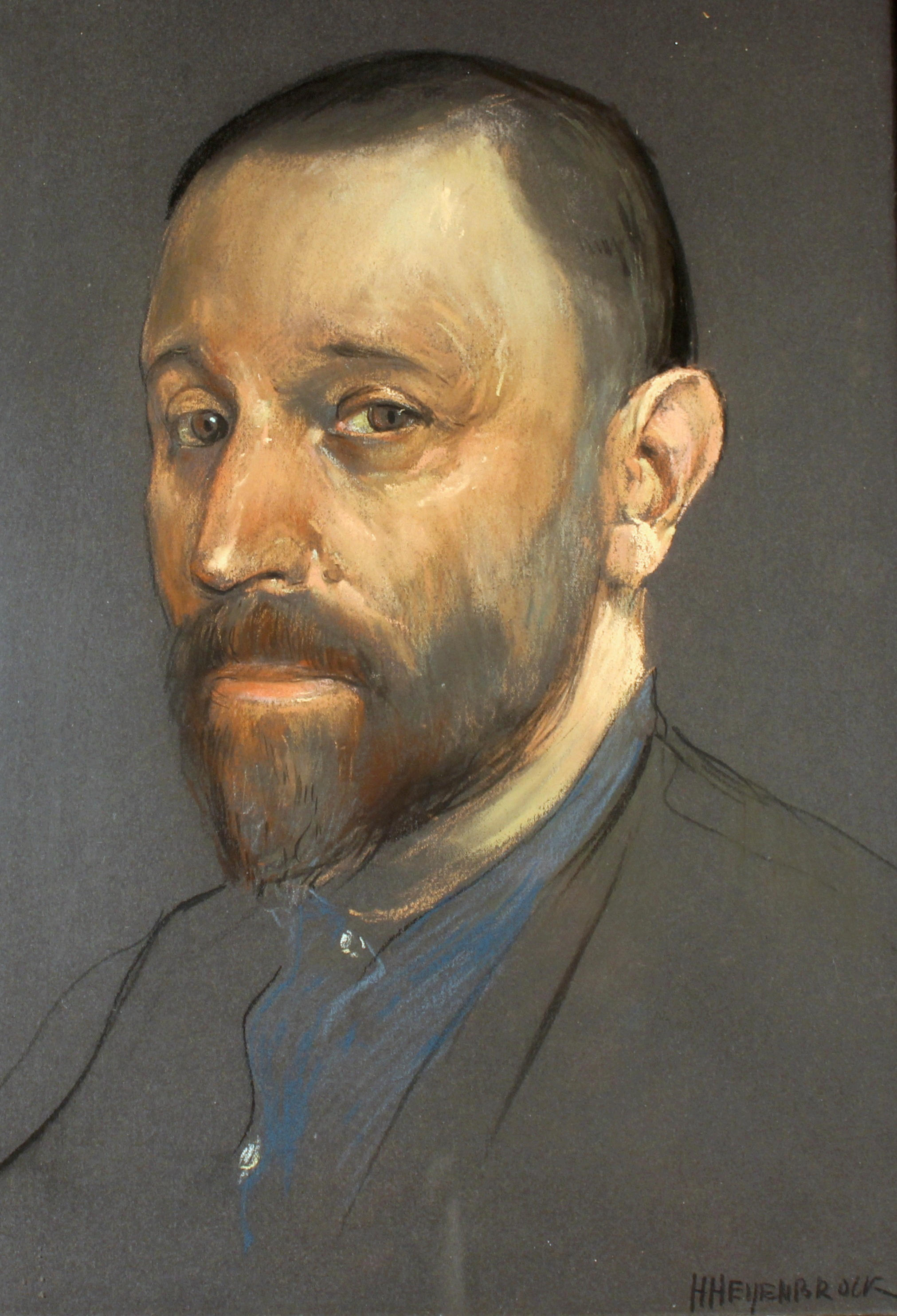
Self-portrait 1916

Herman Heijenbrock (1871 in Amsterdam – 1948 in Blaricum), was a Dutch writer, painter, pastel draughtsman, and lithographer. He founded the "Museum van den Arbeid" in 1923, which later became NEMO Science Museum.

== Biography ==
He was the son of a baker and merchant in marine equipment. According to the RKD he learned to paint at the "Academie voor Beeldende Kunsten" in Rotterdam. Soon after graduation he visited the Borinage, a coal-mining district in Belgium. He found work in a theater making backdrops and later went to work as an art-journalist and draughtsman for the Rotterdams Nieuwsblad, which he quit in 1898 to become a professional landscape painter in Noordwijk. He returned to the Borinage to make sketches of the picturesque surroundings, but became depressed by the working conditions and the high amount of disease among the miners and their families. He tried to convince various influential artists to help him work on improving the working conditions of the common man, but met with little success. He wrote a pamphlet called "Onze samenleving in woord en beeld" (Amsterdam, circa 1899) in which he explained his view on working conditions, though he felt that social democracy was not the answer.

=== Laren art colony and politics ===
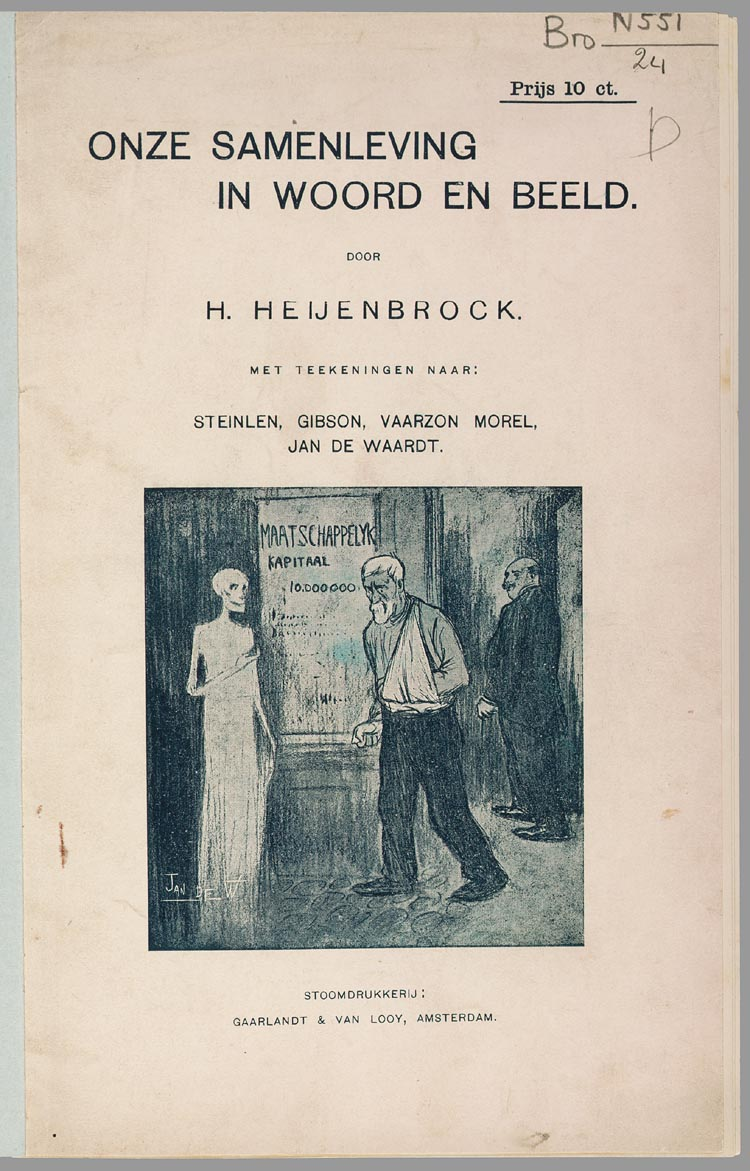
Pamphlet "Our society in words and pictures", 1899

He married in 1899 and moved to Melkweg 2, Blaricum where he became active in the art colony in the neighboring town of Laren. He and his wife became friends with the artist R.N. Roland Holst and his wife, the poet Henriette Roland Holst, and the poet Herman Gorter, who all lived near their home in Blaricum. He began corresponding with Frederik van Eeden over his interest in improving working conditions, and responded to Van Eeden's 1899 lecture 'Waarvoor werkt gij?' (Why do you work?) with another pamphlet "Over de Nieuwe Tijden" (About modern times). He shared the political views of Daniël de Clercq and in 1901-1902 they organized some lectures where Van Eeden spoke. He travelled with Van Eeden's brother-in-law to the Ruhrgebiet to see the industrial lifestyle there. Heijenbrock agreed with the American writer Gerald Stanley Lee who said "Not to see poetry in the machinery of this present age, is not to see poetry in the life of the age. It is not to believe in the age." In 1910 Van Eeden brought the writer Lee over to the Netherlands to hold lectures on his "Voice of the Machines" and they visited Heijenbrock. Van Eeden described him after that meeting in his diary as "our greatest painter".

=== Trips to industrial centers ===
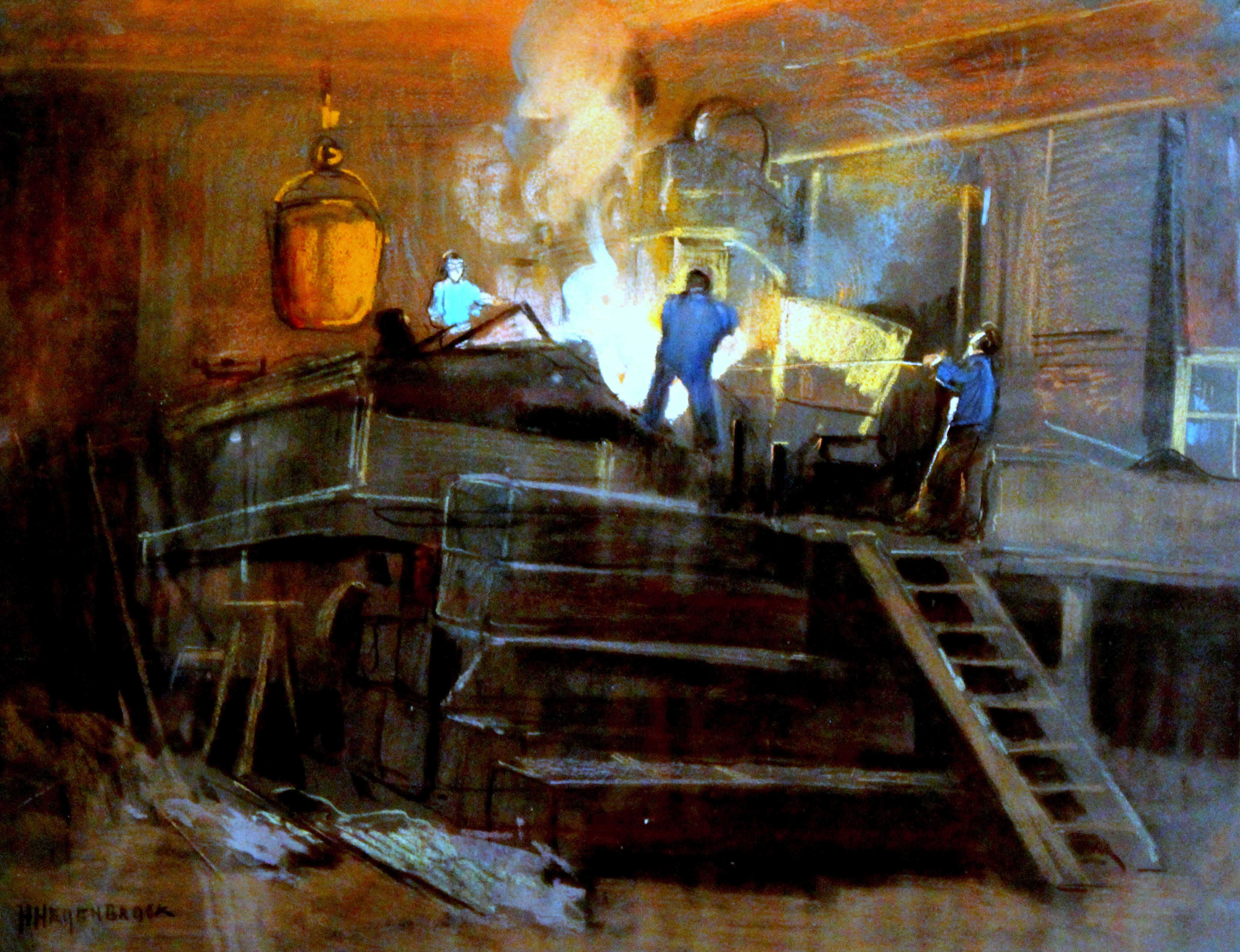
Steel smelters, Sweden

Heijenbrock began to travel everywhere that had an industrial center to paint and sketch modern industrial workers at everyday tasks. He visited Saargebiet, Wales, the Midlands in Engeland and shipyards in Scotland. In Sweden he painted quarries and pine forests to show the raw materials for building roads, railways, and the paper industry. In the Netherlands he mostly painted the harbours, but when World War I broke out he was confined to the Dutch borders and began to visit local industrial sites. In his enthusiasm to show the entire industrialization process, he began to collect various modern instruments and inventions.

In 1921 he joined the board of the ‘Vereeniging voor Beeldende Kunsten Laren-Blaricum’, an artist collective that still exists today in Laren and Blaricum. In the same year he wrote to Van Eeden that he had collected enough for a museum, and in 1922 he held an exhibition at the Stedelijk Museum Amsterdam. A year later his wife died, but he managed to found the "Stichting Museum van den Arbeid" and installed his budding museum collection in the attic of the Veiligheidsmuseum, Amsterdam.

=== Museum van den Arbeid ===
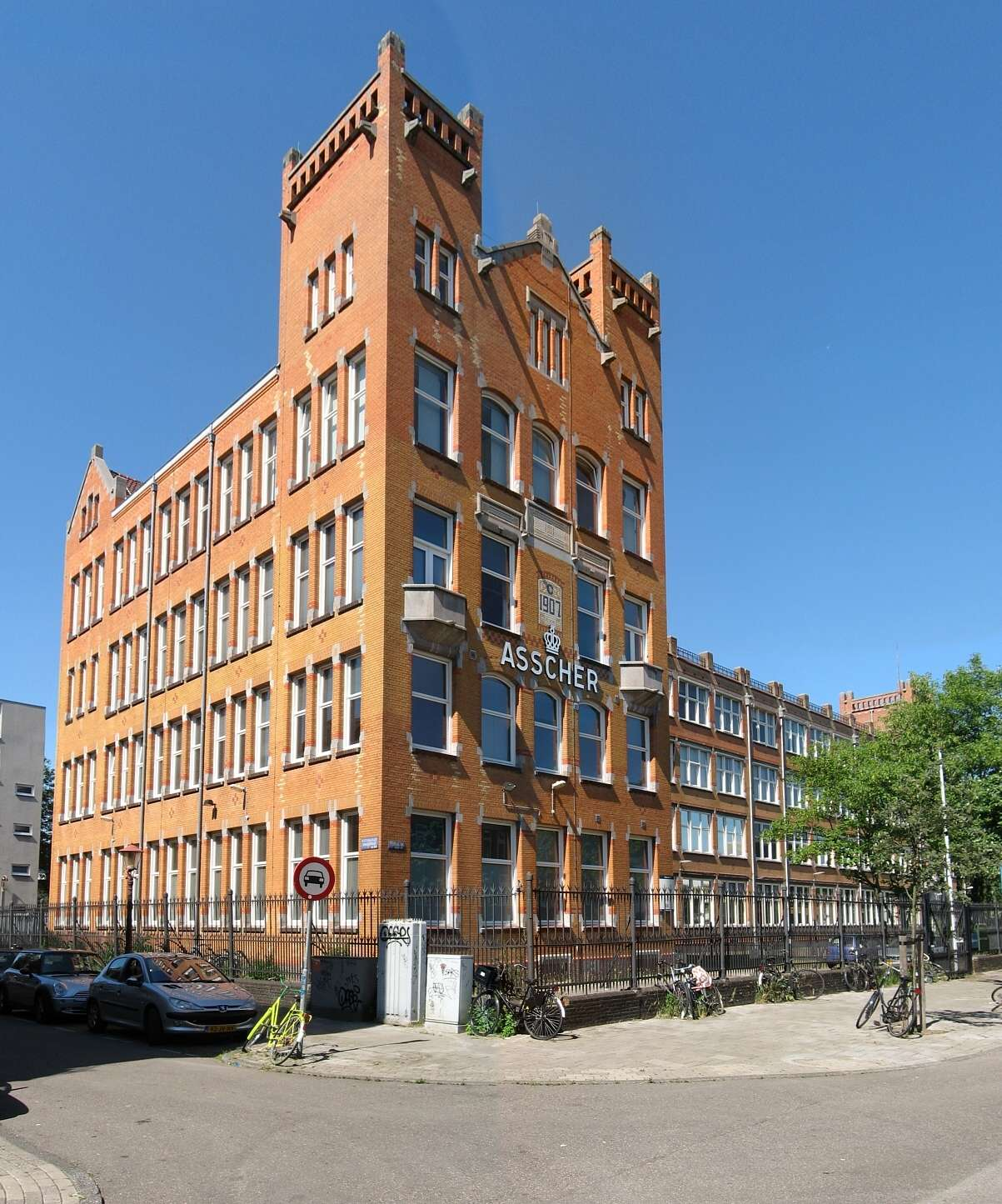
Former location of the NINT until 1997.

The Museum van den Arbeid was opened in 1929 and was situated in an old school located on the corner of the Marnixstraat at Rozengracht 224-226 in Amsterdam (torn down, the site is currently a fire station ). In 1980 the name was changed to "Nederlands Instituut voor Nijverheid en Techniek" (NINT) and moved to the Tolstraat 127 (the former headquarters of the Royal Asscher Diamond Company). In 1997 the NINT closed and the collection was absorbed by NEMO. Nemo sold 400 of his works to the Gemeente Museum Helmond. The archive of his museum is in the hands of the Amsterdam City Archives.

His work is mostly inspired by factories and industrial workers of all shapes and kinds. The works he made of the area where he lived in Laren and Blaricum are confined to the few textile factories that the area had during his time there. He became known as 'de schilder van licht en arbeid' (the painter of light and work) and won many commissions for "portraits" of factories by leading Dutch businessmen. Heijenbrock's works often hang in museums near the old factories that commissioned them, such as the Hoogovensmuseum, Nemo, the Amsterdam Museum, and the museum in Helmond. He became a member of the Amsterdam artist collective Arti et Amicitiae, and in 1933 he helped found the Goois Museum in Hilversum.

Heijenbrock's work was included in the 1939 exhibition and sale Onze Kunst van Heden (Our Art of Today) at the Rijksmuseum in Amsterdam.

== Publications ==
- Over de Nieuwe Tijden: naar aanleiding van de lezing van Fr. van Eeden, waarvoor werkt gij?, 1899
- Onze samenleving in woord en beeld, 1899
