= Duncan Campbell (revivalist) =

Scottish evangelist

Duncan Campbell (13 February 1898 - 28 March 1972) was a Scottish Evangelist, who is best known for being a leader in the Lewis Awakening or Hebrides Revival, a mid-20th century religious revival in the Scottish Hebrides.

== Early life ==
Campbell was born at Blackcrofts at Benderloch in the parish of Ardchattan in the Scottish Highlands, and came to faith through "Pilgrims" of the Faith Mission in 1913. After military service during the First World War, he trained with the Faith Mission and served with them, mainly in the Highlands and Islands of Scotland, including on the island of Skye. He was particularly equipped for this as a native Gaelic speaker.

In 1925, Campbell resigned from the Faith Mission and married Shona Gray, whom he had long known. She had just returned for health reasons from two years service with Algiers Mission Band. He served as a missionary at the United Free Church at Ardvasar on Skye, but dissented from that church's union with the Church of Scotland with the result that he had to give up his post.

Campbell's next post was ministering to a church at Balintore, Easter Ross which had also dissented from the union, building a new church for the continuing United Free Church where he ministered until he accepted the call to the United Free Church at Falkirk. In 1942, during his work there, Campbell was ordained as a minister. He later described this period as 'years of backsliding ... a barren spiritual wilderness'.

== Lewis Awakening ==
In 1949, Campbell felt called to rejoin the Faith Mission, which provided him with a house in Edinburgh. However, his ministry took him back to Skye, where he had worked 25 years before, travelling to and from Edinburgh by motorcycle. This work was successful, leading to people being converted to Christ. He was thoroughly engaged in that work when he received the call to go to the Isle of Lewis in the Outer Hebrides. He initially resisted this call, but doors closed in Skye, opening the opportunity for him to go.

The call came from the Reverend James Murray MacKay, at the prompting of two Gaelic-speaking sisters in their eighties, who had been praying for revival. It was only at the third invitation that Campbell accepted. Over the following years he traveled from village to village preaching with many people being converted.

On one occasion Campbell was the main preacher at the Faith Mission Convention at Hamilton Road Presbyterian Church in Bangor, Northern Ireland, when he suddenly felt that he must leave at once, despite being engaged to speak at the closing meeting there the next day. He went (according to the call) to the island of Berneray off Harris, where he met an elder of the local church (then without a minister), who was so convinced that Campbell was coming that he had already announced the meetings at which Campbell was to preach. After several days of meetings, suddenly the island was gripped with a new awareness of God.

After unreliable reports of events on Lewis, he published a booklet, The Lewis Awakening, as an official account of this revival.

== Later ministry and death ==
In 1958, Campbell was called to become principal of the Faith Mission's Training Home and Bible College in Edinburgh, where he served for a number of years, before retiring. During his retirement, he was a regular preacher at conventions in Great Britain, Ireland, South Africa, the United States and elsewhere, including the Stornoway Convention, which he had founded. He was also a visiting lecturer at colleges, such as Youth With A Mission's School of Evangelism at Lausanne in Switzerland, and died while lecturing there.

== Theology ==
Campbell was outspoken about two aspects of the work of the Holy Spirit. The first was that, in his view, a true revival was a move of God that affected, not only church members, but the surrounding community in a way that was visible to all parties concerned (work stopping, bars closing, crime ceasing, etc.). The second was the definite and profound experience of the baptism of the Holy Ghost subsequent to conversion.

His practice in evangelistic meetings was not to make the usual altar call, but to invite people to come to another room to pray and seek God. In his ministry in Lewis, he sought to transcend denominational boundaries, but this was at times difficult.

Duncan Campbell was, before everything else, a man of prayer and almost invariably started the day with a period of prayer and study of the Bible.

== In film ==
The story of Duncan Campbell during the Hebridean Revival is told in the 2008 documentary film Great Christian Revivals. An extract from the film: "Duncan Campbell said, 'Revival is a community saturated with God.' Campbell witnessed first hand the Spirit of God descending upon a community and learned to let the Holy Spirit have His way. In his own words, 'Seventy-five percent (of the people) were gloriously saved before they came near a meeting..... the power of God was moving!'"
