= Willem Bilderdijk =

Dutch historian, linguist, poet and lawyer (1756–1831)

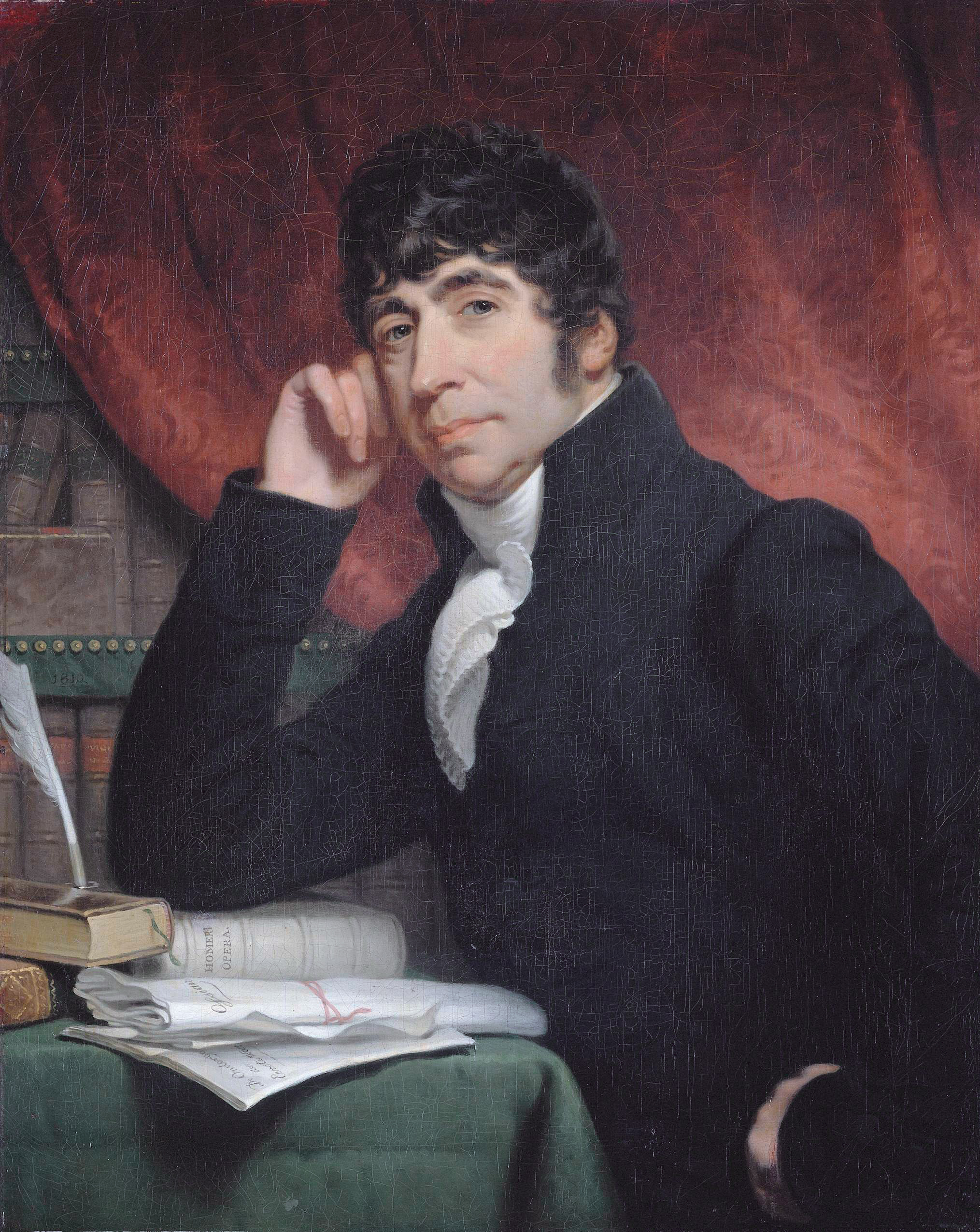
- Willem Bilderdijk (Charles Howard Hodges, 1810)
- Born: 7 September 1756; Amsterdam, Dutch Republic
- Died: 18 December 1831 (aged 75); Haarlem, United Kingdom of the Netherlands
- Education: Leiden University
- Occupation: lawyer
- Writing career
- Genre: Poet

Willem Bilderdijk (Dutch pronunciation: [ˈʋɪləm ˈbɪldərˌdɛik]; 7 September 1756 – 18 December 1831) was a Dutch poet, historian, lawyer, and linguist.

== Life ==
Willem Bilderdijk was born on 7 September 1756 in Amsterdam in the Dutch Republic.

He was the son of an Amsterdam physician. When he was six years old an accident to his foot incapacitated him for ten years, and he developed habits of continuous and concentrated study. His parents were ardent partisans of the House of Orange-Nassau, and Bilderdijk grew up with strong monarchical and Calvinistic convictions.

After studying at Leiden University, Bilderdijk obtained his doctorate in law in 1782, and began to practise as an advocate at The Hague. Three years later he contracted an unhappy marriage with Rebecca Woesthoven. He refused in 1795 to take the oath to the administration of the new Batavian Republic, and was consequently obliged to leave the Netherlands. He went to Hamburg, and then to London, where his great learning procured him consideration.

There he had as a pupil Katharina Wilhelmina Schweickhardt (1776–1830), the daughter of the Dutch painter Heinrich Wilhelm Schweickhardt and herself a poet. When he left London in June 1797 for Braunschweig, this lady followed him, and after he had formally divorced his first wife (1802) they were married.

In 1806 he was persuaded by his friends to return to the Netherlands, where the Batavian Republic had been replaced by a monarchy, the first king being Louis Bonaparte, a brother of the French emperor Napoleon Bonaparte. Louis Napoleon received Bilderdijk kindly and made him his librarian, and a member and eventually president (1809–1811) of the Royal Institute.

Bilderdijk also taught the king Dutch although on one occasion, the king supposedly told his people that he was the "Konijn van 'Olland" ("rabbit of 'Olland"), rather than "Koning van Holland" ("King of Holland") because he had difficulty mastering Dutch pronunciation.

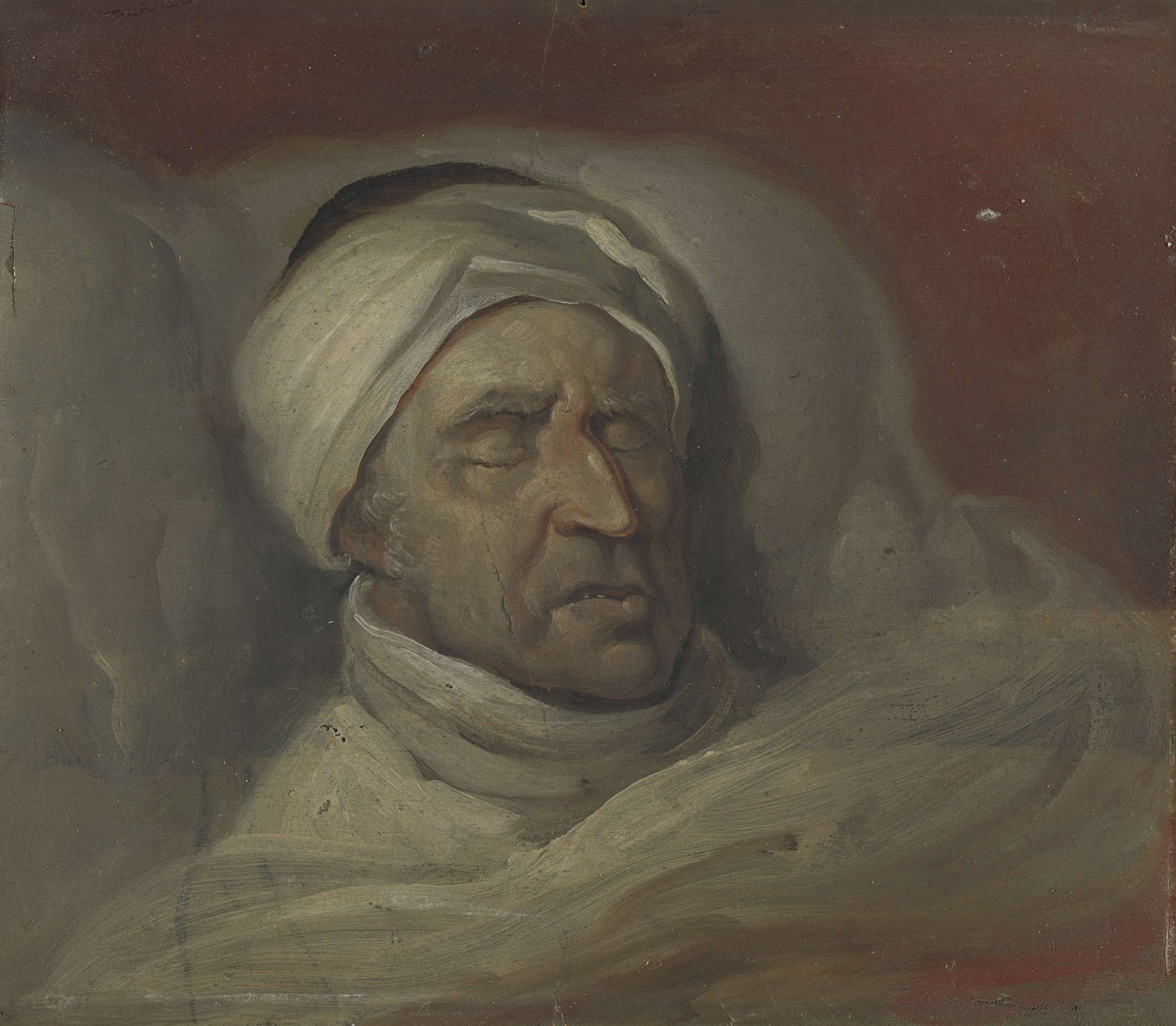
Death bed portrait of Bilderdijk by Gerrit Jan Michaëlis from 1831

After the abdication of Louis, Bilderdijk suffered great poverty; on the accession of William I of the Netherlands in 1813, he hoped to be made a professor but was disappointed and became a history tutor at Leiden. He continued his vigorous campaign against liberal ideas to his death.

Bilderdijk was the founder of the spiritual movement "Het Réveil", which tried to give a Christian answer to the ideals of the French Revolution. Among his disciples were Abraham Capadose, Willem de Clercq, Guillaume Groen van Prinsterer, and especially Isaac da Costa, who called his teacher "anti-revolutionary, anti-Barneveldtian, anti-Loevesteinish, anti-liberal".

Bilderdijk died in Haarlem in the United Kingdom of the Netherlands on 18 December 1831.

== Legacy ==
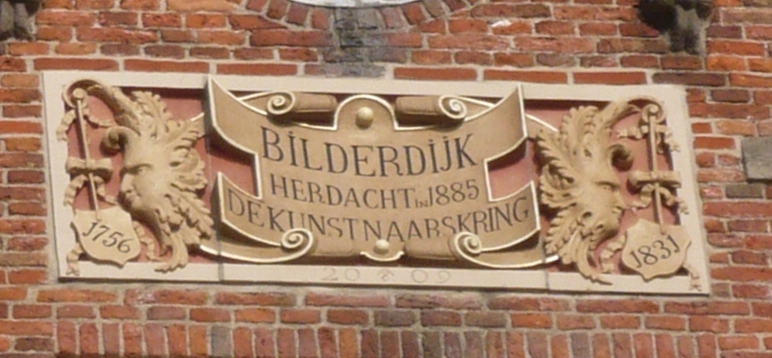
Gable stone in top of facade to Grote Markt 11, the house Bilderdijk lived in when he died on the Grote Markt, Haarlem

According to Godfried Bomans, who named a club after his pseudonym Teisterbant, the bed Bilderdijk died in was kept until 1950 as a curiosity for people to look at. A commemorative gable stone was placed on the top gable of his old house in 1885, and a commemorative stone is also in the St. Bavochurch.

The collection and archive of Bilderdijk and the Bilderdijk Museum is available at Leiden University Library.
