= Thomas Ainsworth =

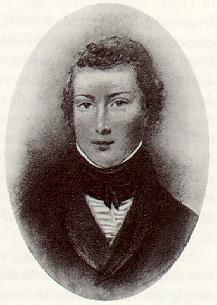
Thomas ainsworth

Thomas Ainsworth (1795–1841) was an Englishman and the founding father of Nijverdal, a small town in the Netherlands, during the 19th century. He laid the basis for the Royal Steam Weaving Mill (KSW) in Nijverdal in 1836 that is still operating today under the name Koninklijke Ten Cate NV.

== Biography ==
Son of Betty (née Hargreave) and prominent Lancashire cotton industrialist, Thomas Ainsworth (1758–1831) and grandson of pioneer of chemical bleaching and founder of Halliwell bleach works, Peter Ainsworth (1713–1780). Thomas Ainsworth (1795–1841) was born in Bolton le Moors, Lancashire a textile-producing region in England. He married Jane Bower of West Retford, Nottinghamshire in 1820, and together they had 5 children.

Thomas Ainsworth was a textile engineer who established synthetic bleach works in Almelo, Aalten and Enschede, eastern Netherlands and later founded the Twente Steam bleach works in Goor in 1832. He also established a textile school in Overijssel. His works brought economic prosperity to those regions of the Netherlands.

When the cotton firm of Thomas Ainsworth's father went bankrupt, Thomas and his brother, Edward Ainsworth, moved with their families to France and later on to the United Kingdom of the Netherlands (in an area now in Belgium) to work in the cotton industry. Later, in Belgium, Thomas worked in the blast furnace of John Cockerill in Seraing.

When the Belgian Revolution started Thomas moved to an area that stayed in the Netherlands and lived for more than a year in the Zaanstreek before he got the idea to go to Elberfeld, Germany to work with chemical aspects of the textile industry which he was very much interested in as later found in a book that he worked for Van Gelder, Schouten & Co where they made bleached and colored paper.

On his way towards Germany he passed Twente, situated in the east of the Netherlands. This was a region that was of particular interest for the Dutch government for a textile company and therefore Thomas was the chosen man. He also went to textile companies Aalten and Hofkes situated in Almelo to build machines for bleaching.

Charles de Maere, a Belgian textile entrepreneur who came to live in Twente after 1830 wanted the expertise of Thomas Ainsworth and later on in 1832 the secretary of the Nederlandsche Handel-Maatschappij, Willem de Clercq talked about their own textile industry in Twente upon which Nijverdal was founded with the coming of the Royal Steam Weaving Mill (KSW).

Ainsworth died suddenly in 1841. His grave can still be found in the town of Goor.
