= NEMO (museum) =

Science centre in Amsterdam, Netherlands

NEMO Science Museum
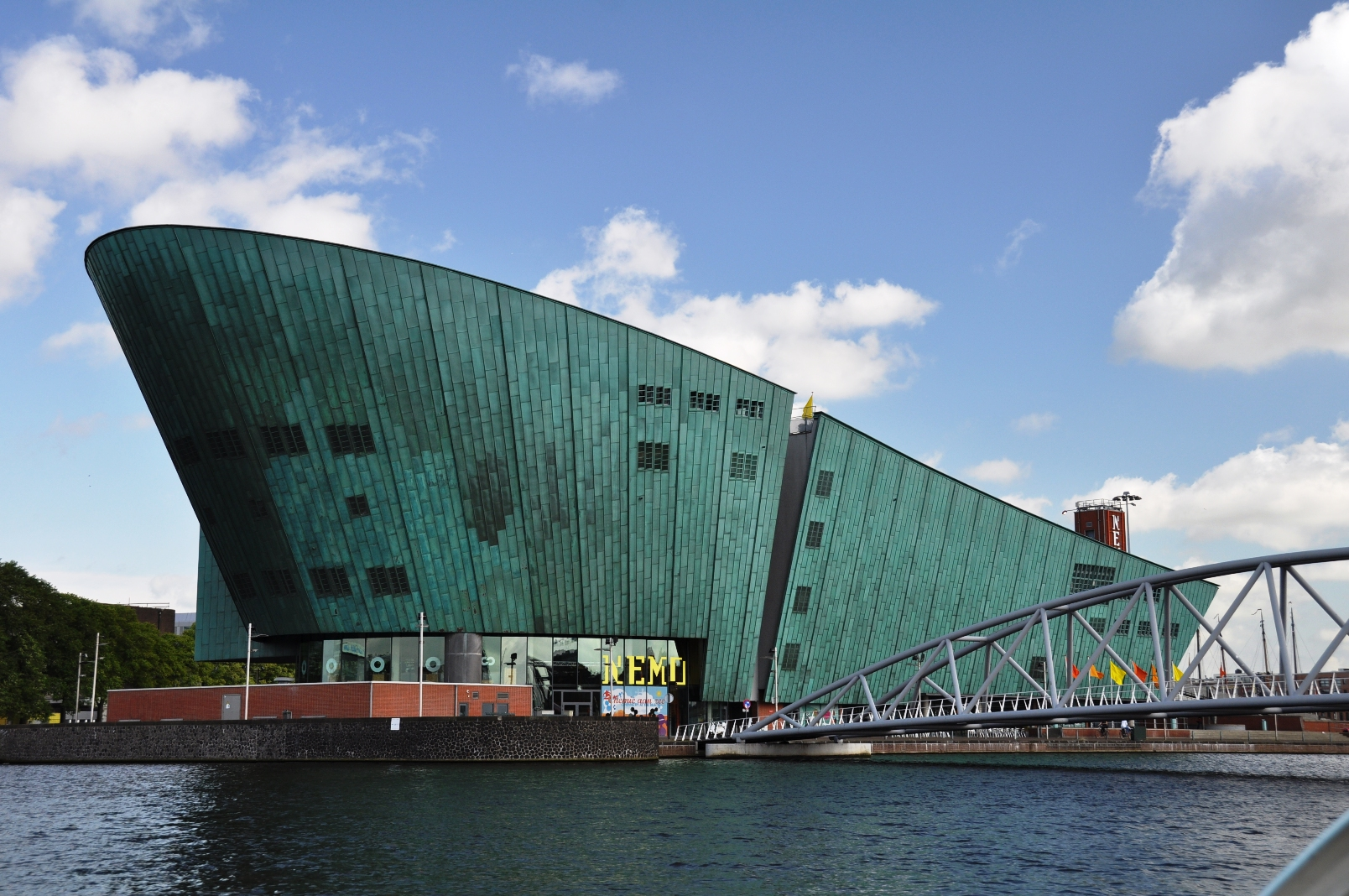
- Nemo's building was designed by Renzo Piano

- Location within the city center of Amsterdam
- Established: 1923
- Location: Oosterdok 2 Amsterdam, Netherlands
- Coordinates: 52°22′26.69″N 4°54′44.46″E
- Type: Science center
- Visitors: 727,737 (2023)
- Director: Michiel Buchel
- President: Annemieke Roobeek
- Public transit access: Amsterdam Centraal
- Parking: Parkeergarage Oosterdok
- Website: nemosciencemuseum.nl/en/

NEMO Science Museum (from Latin: Nemo, lit. 'Nobody') is a science centre in Amsterdam, Netherlands. It is located in the Oosterdokseiland neighbourhood in the Amsterdam-Centrum borough, situated between the Oosterdokseiland and the Kattenburg. The museum has its origins in 1923, and is housed in a building designed by Renzo Piano since 1997. It contains five floors of hands-on science exhibitions and is the largest science center in the Netherlands. It attracts around 728,000 visitors annually, which makes it the seventh most visited museum in the Netherlands.

== History ==
The museum has its origins in 1923, when the Museum van den Arbeid (English: Museum of Labor) was opened by the artist Herman Heijenbrock on the Rozengracht in Amsterdam. In 1954 the name was changed to the NINT or Nederlands Instituut voor Nijverheid en Techniek (English: Dutch Institute for Labor and Technology), and in 1997 it changed again to newMetropolis. The name Science Center Nemo was introduced in 2000. In 2016, the name was changed to NEMO Science Museum.

== Exhibitions ==
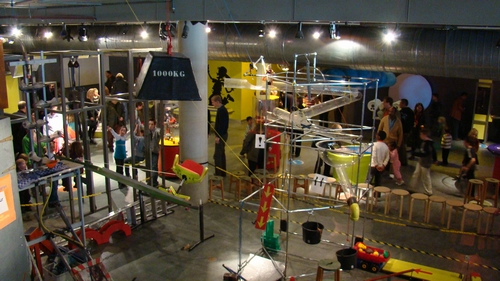
Set-up of the 'chain reaction' on the first floor of the museum.

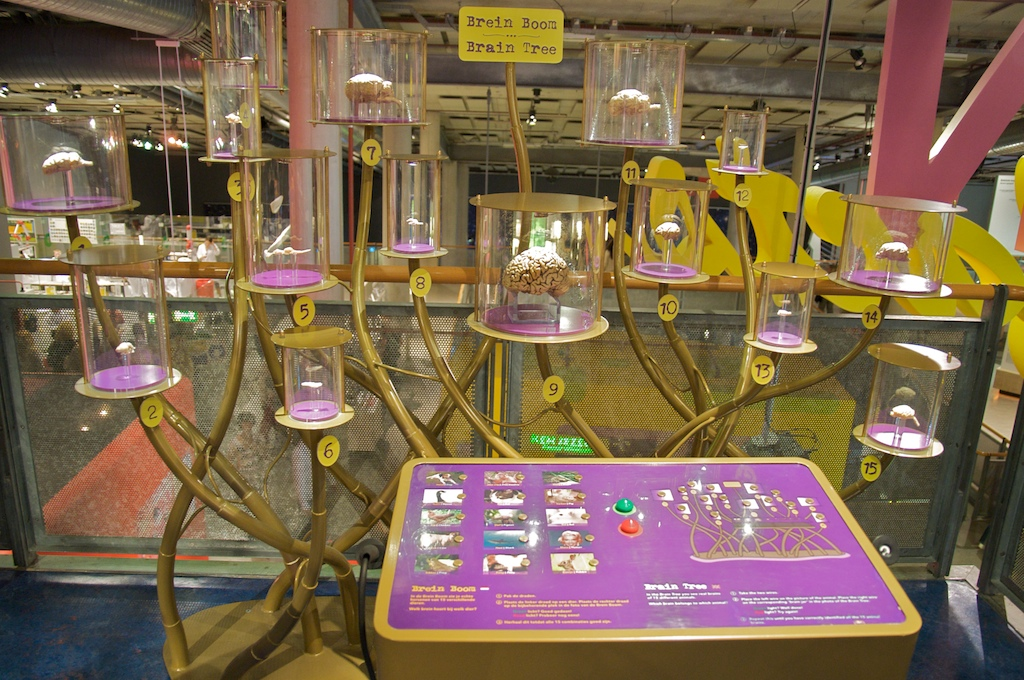
Exhibition about animal brains on the fourth floor of the museum.

Inside the lobby there is a small cafeteria and a gift shop which sells small scale copies of some of the attractions at Nemo like the giant domino set and the DNA experiments.

The main concepts on the first floor are DNA and chain reactions which include a room with giant dominoes with contraptions like a giant bell and a flying car. Also on the first floor is a show on the half-hour, which features a large chain reaction circuit.

On the second floor is a ball factory where small plastic balls are sent on a circuit where participants are to group them in weight, size, and color and then send them to a packing facility where the balls go into a small metal box. There are five stations at which the people stick magnetic barcodes on the boxes and send them off to start the circuit again. On the second level, there is also a small cafeteria and a movie and performance hall where various acts and movies about science are shown. The second floor also features a display on the water cycle a display on electricity and a display on metals and buildings.

The third floor has a giant science lab in which people can do science experiments such as testing vitamin C in certain substances and looking at DNA. There is also a small section on money and business.

On the fourth floor is a section about the human mind, it has such experiments as memory tests, mind problems, and sense testers. The fourth floor is quite dark which adds to the eeriness of the surroundings.

The fifth floor or upper deck has a cafeteria, a children's play area and a great view of the city surroundings.
