= Middelbare Technische School (Haarlem) =

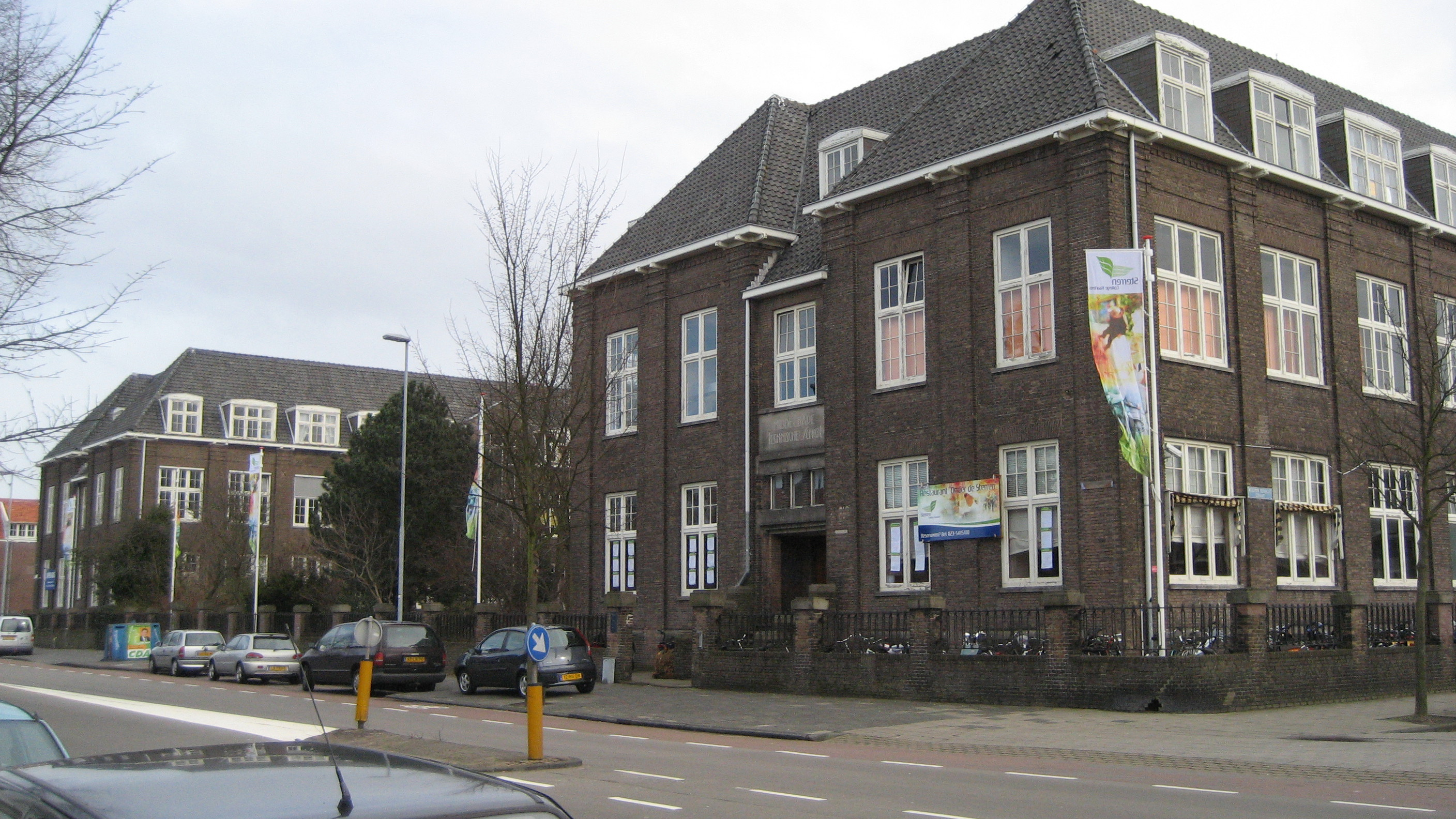
- Verspronckweg, Haarlem, Netherlands

Information
- Type: Public Vocational school
- Motto: last housed Sterren College Haarlem
- Established: 1919
- Staff: 82
- Enrollment: 715
- Website: http://www.sterrencollegehaarlem.nl

The Middelbare Technische School is a former MTS middelbare school on the Verspronckweg, Haarlem, Netherlands. It is one of the oldest public vocational schools in Haarlem, built as a boys school in 1919, which grew out of the first Ambachtsschool that was located on the Kamperstraat. It currently houses one of the locations of the Sterren College.

== History ==
This school that had such a difficult time during World War II because National Socialists ran it. After the war, it became the "Hoger Technische School" (HTS), and the young students were taught how to fix trams, trains, and airplanes. On the Indonesian island Flores, many technical achievements were realized after being drawn and fabricated in this school.

In 2010 the school and its history were one of the subjects at the Historisch Museum Haarlem's exhibition "Leren voor het Leven" (learning for life), a compilation of materials from various vocational schools in the Haarlem area.

== Sterren College ==
The Sterren College school offers vmbo schooling today at a new location on the Badminton pad in Haarlem.
