= Vocational school (Haarlem) =

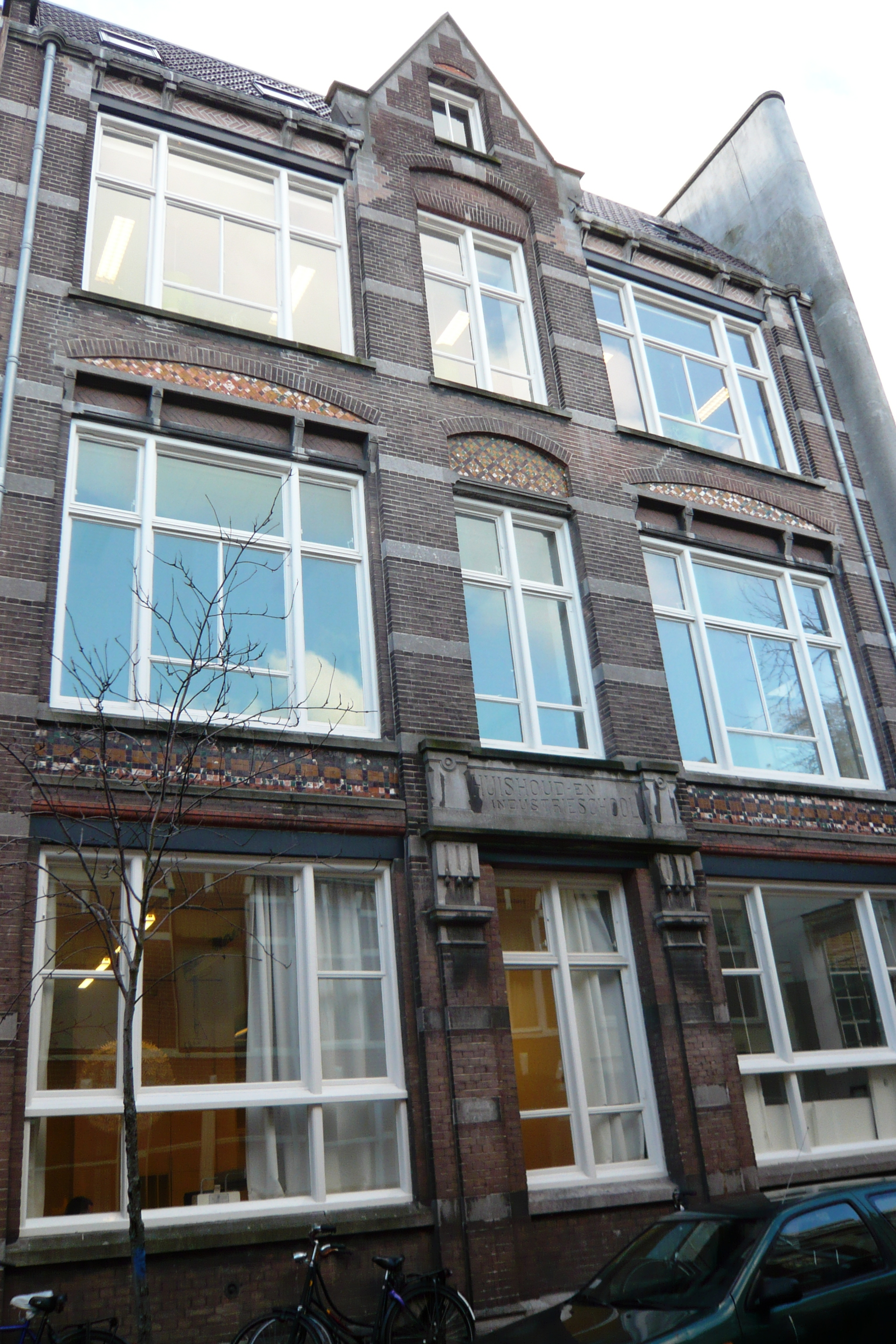
Huishoud en Industrieschool for girls in the Schneevoogtstraat, Haarlem, 1901

Vocational School, Vakschool, Huishoudschool, or Ambachtsschool in Haarlem refers to set of Haarlem schools that conformed to a type of Dutch Junior High School based on practical training with the aim of obtaining employment. This type of school was discontinued with the 1968 law for further schooling called the Wet op het voortgezet onderwijs or Mammoetwet.

== History ==
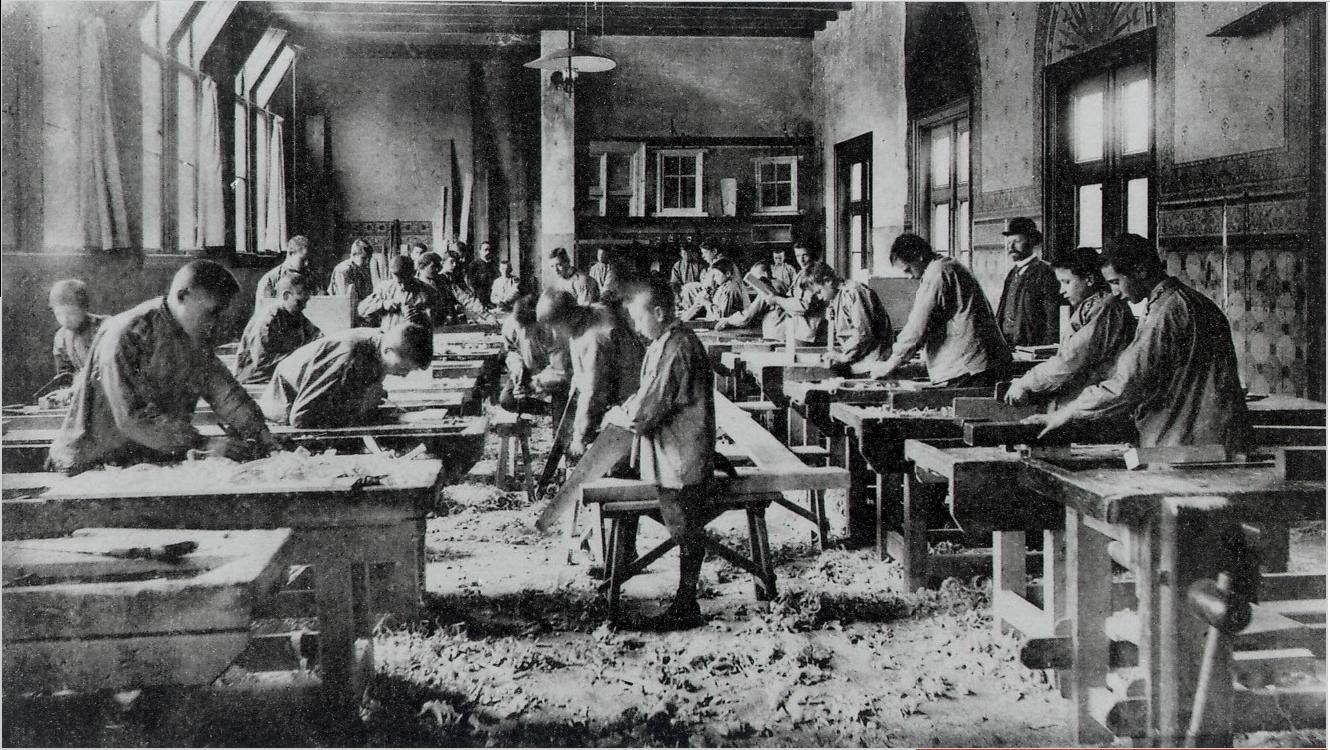
Boys at the ambachtsschool on the Kamperstraat in the carpentry class, ca. 1900

At the end of the 18th century, the traditional guild training system of apprentice, then journeyman, then master craftsman, was abolished along with the guilds themselves, during the French occupation by Napoleonic decree. A long period ensued without any educational facilities to take its place. A century later, when the Industrial Revolution came to Haarlem, the need for qualified staff was felt more and more by local businesses struggling to keep up with the times. Haarlem companies like Th. Figee & Co, the shipyard Werf Conrad, and Koninklijke Fabriek van Rijtuigen en Spoorwagens J.J. Beijnes (who represented the Dutch Railway company in Haarlem) eventually set up their own evening schools, where the young students worked during the day and studied in the evening. The first one was in the Lange Margarethastraat, an evening school for young factory workers (both boys and girls) in 1871. This evening "Industrial School", which was for the lower income households, was not a great success, since young people who worked all day had trouble concentrating in the evening. More and more voices were heard in favor of proper day schooling, and in 1891, the social activist Daniel de Clercq began the Haarlem society called De Ambachtsschool to unify these various city efforts to start a vocational school in Haarlem. In 1892 the first Haarlem ambachtsschool called the Haarlemsche Ambachtsschool opened its doors on the Kamperstraat (demolished for senior housing in the 1970s).

Though De Clercq left the society in 1892, the school was a success and in 1899 the newly formed Eerste Nederlandsche Electrische Tram-Maatschappij opened the first tram line from Haarlem to Zandvoort, and the wagons were serviced at JJ Beijnes with graduates from this school.

=== Leerplicht ===
To help such schools concentrate on the practical lessons, the law for compulsory education (leerplicht) was passed in 1900 for children aged 6–12. This assured that the students of the Ambachtsschool would already be literate before attendance. This also meant school for girls however, and in 1901, just around the corner on the Schneevoogtstraat, the first day school for girls was opened, called the "Eerste Haarlemsche Huishoud- en Industrieschool", or "Household School".

The Ambacht and Huishoud schools offered a three-year education and "extra classes". Some of the "extra class" names in the Household school were ‘nat en droogwaschen’ (wet and dry-cleaning), ‘strijken’ (ironing), ‘tafeldienen’ (waiting tables), ‘naaien van lijfgoed’ (sewing underwear) and ‘koken' (cooking) for workmen's wives. The extra classes were paid separately. For example the cooking class for children cost 1 guilder and fifty cents, but the meal could be eaten afterwards.

In need of more space for the practical lessons, the Ambachtsschool expanded and in 1919 the "Middelbare Technische School" (MTS) opened on the Verspronckweg. It was this school that had such a difficult time during WWII because it was run by National Socialists. After the war, it became the "Hoger Technische School" (HTS), and the young students were taught how to fix trams, trains, and airplanes. On the Indonesian island Flores, many technical achievements were realized after being drawn and fabricated in this school.

After 1968 the schools changed hands. Today nothing remains of the original Ambachtsschool, while the former Huishoudschool on the Schneevoogtstraat is rented to small businesses. The former MTS, later HTS, now houses another school.

== See also ==
Mons Aurea, Garenkokerskade
