= Daniël de Clercq =

Dutch socialist and activist

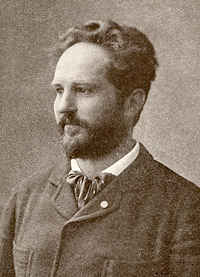
- Born: 21 August 1854; Heerde
- Died: 15 December 1931 (aged 77); Haarlem
- Relatives: Willem de Clercq (grandfather)

Daniël "Daan" de Clercq (21 August 1854 in Heerde – 15 December 1931 in Haarlem) was a Dutch socialist and activist.

== Biography ==
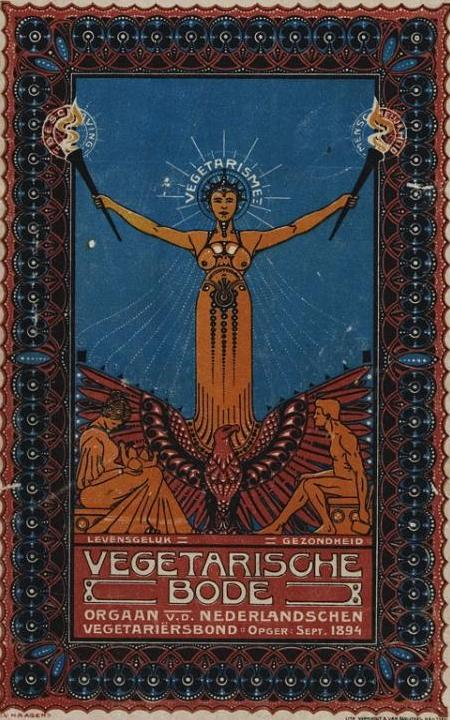
Cover of the Dutch League of Vegetarian's magazine Vegetarische Bode, founded in September 1894.

He was the grandson of Willem de Clercq and grew up in Haarlem where he became good friends with Frederik van Eeden at the HBS high school there. After continuing his education by studying technology in Delft and chemistry in Berlin he settled in Leiden, but in 1878 he returned to Haarlem to become the technical director of a paint factory there, where he lived the rest of his life. For this factory he introduced several labor reforms which he then tried to scale to the rest of Haarlem and later as a member of the socialist labor party, to the rest of the country. His first act was to create a room for workers to eat their meals; a "schaftlokaal" or cafeteria. He next instituted health insurance and accident insurance for his employees along the lines of Bismarck's Health Insurance Bill of 1883 and Accident Insurance Bill of 1884. He expressed the need for secondary school for the future workers of his factory and wished to create a training school connected to his factory. These extra expenses were not popular with his employer however and de Clercq quit his job in 1890. In 1891, he began the Haarlem society called De Ambachtsschool to unify various city efforts to start the first vocational school in Haarlem. He also became a member of the Haarlem Debating society where he advocated his views on housing and education reform for the working class in Haarlem. In 1883 he joined the Amsterdam freethought society De Dageraad.

He propagated land nationalisation whereby he combined the "gardencity" ideas of Ebenezer Howard with the socialist ideas of Domela Nieuwenhuis who he knew through "De Dageraad". He believed that by nationalizing the land and creating freestanding homes for everyone, more workers would have more energy for society due to better health. These ideas were popular among workers and reformers alike. He organized meetings where the painter-reformer Herman Heijenbrock and the writer-reformer Frederik van Eeden could air their social ideas. He became an activist for vegetarianism. In 1894 he joined the newly formed NVB, the Dutch Vegetarian Society (Dutch: Nederlandse Vegetariërsbond) and became editor of its magazine Vegetarische Bode in 1897. In 1898 he succeeded Felix Ortt as chairman of the group and remained chairman until 1907. He published numerous brochures and articles and was a popular guest speaker for reformist groups. He was also candidate of the SDAP (Dutch socialist party).

== List of publications ==
- Schoolbaden [School bathing] (Haarlem 1890)
- Voordracht gehouden op 1 mei 1890 in 'Felix Favore', Haarlem [Speech held on 1 May 1890 in 'Felix Favore', Haarlem] (Haarlem 1890)
- 'Boekbeoordelingen' in: 'De Nieuwe Gids, 137–142 [Book reviews in 'De Nieuwe Gids', 137–142]
- Glasgow en hare gemeente-organisatie. Een voorbeeld van praktisch socialisme met eene beschouwing over inkomsten- of grondrente belasting [Glasgow and it municipal organisation. An example of practical socialism with reflection on income and land interest taxes] (Amsterdam 1891)
- Nog een pleidooi voor den acht-uren-dag [Another pleading for an eight-hour workday] (St. Anna-Parochie 1891)
- Vegetarianisme of natuurlijke leefwijze [Vegetarianism or natural way of living] (St. Anna-Parochie 1891)
- De socialistische kolonie te Sinaloa [The socialist colony in Sinaloa] (St. Anna-Parochie 1891)
- De sociale en etiese betekenis van het vegetarisme [The social and ethical meaning of vegetarianism] (Rotterdam 1891)
- Vegetarisme en alkoholbestrijding [Vegetarianism and fighting alcohol] (St. Anna-Parochie 1899)
- Sport en vegetarisme [Sport and vegetarianism] (Den Haag 1900)
- Een pleidooi voor dieren-recht [A plea for animal rights] (Den Haag 1900)
- 'Domela Nieuwenhuis en het vegetarisme' in: Gedenkboek ter gelegenheid van den 70sten verjaardag van F. Domela Nieuwenhuis 143–144 ['Domela Nieuwenhuis and vegetarianism' in: Gedenkboek ter gelegenheid van den 70sten verjaardag van F. Domela Nieuwenhuis, 143–144] (Amsterdam 1916)
- De vleeschnood en het middel om er aan te ontkomen [The meat problem and a way to escape it] (Amsterdam 1916)
- Het wonder der zon [The miracle of the sun] (Zandvoort 1923)
- De levensverzekering als hygiënisch instituut [The life insurance as a hygienic institute] (Haarlem 1926)
- Radio-rede op 2 April 1927 te Hilversum uitgesproken [Radio reasoning on 2 April 1927 in Hilversum] (Haarlem 1926)
- Radio-rede over de fundamenteele fout in de grondregels onzer samenleving in verband met de exploitatie der Zuiderzee-gronden [Radio reasoning on the fundamental mistakes in the foundational rules of our society in connection with the exploitation of the Zuiderzee grounds] (Haarlem 1929)
- Het 4e internationale Congres tot hervorming van het grondbezitsrecht en den vrijen handel te Edinburg 29 Juli - 5 Augustus 1929 [The 4th international congress for the reformation of right of land ownership and free trade in Edinburgh, 29 July] (Haarlem 1929)
- De rechten der dieren. H.I.R.O. Radio Rede op 26 Februari '31 gehouden [The rights of animals. H.I.R.O. Radio reasoning 26 February 1931] (Haarlem 1931)
