= Huishoud en Industrieschool =

Coordinates: 52°22′25″N 4°38′12″E

Haarlemse Huishoud en Industrieschool
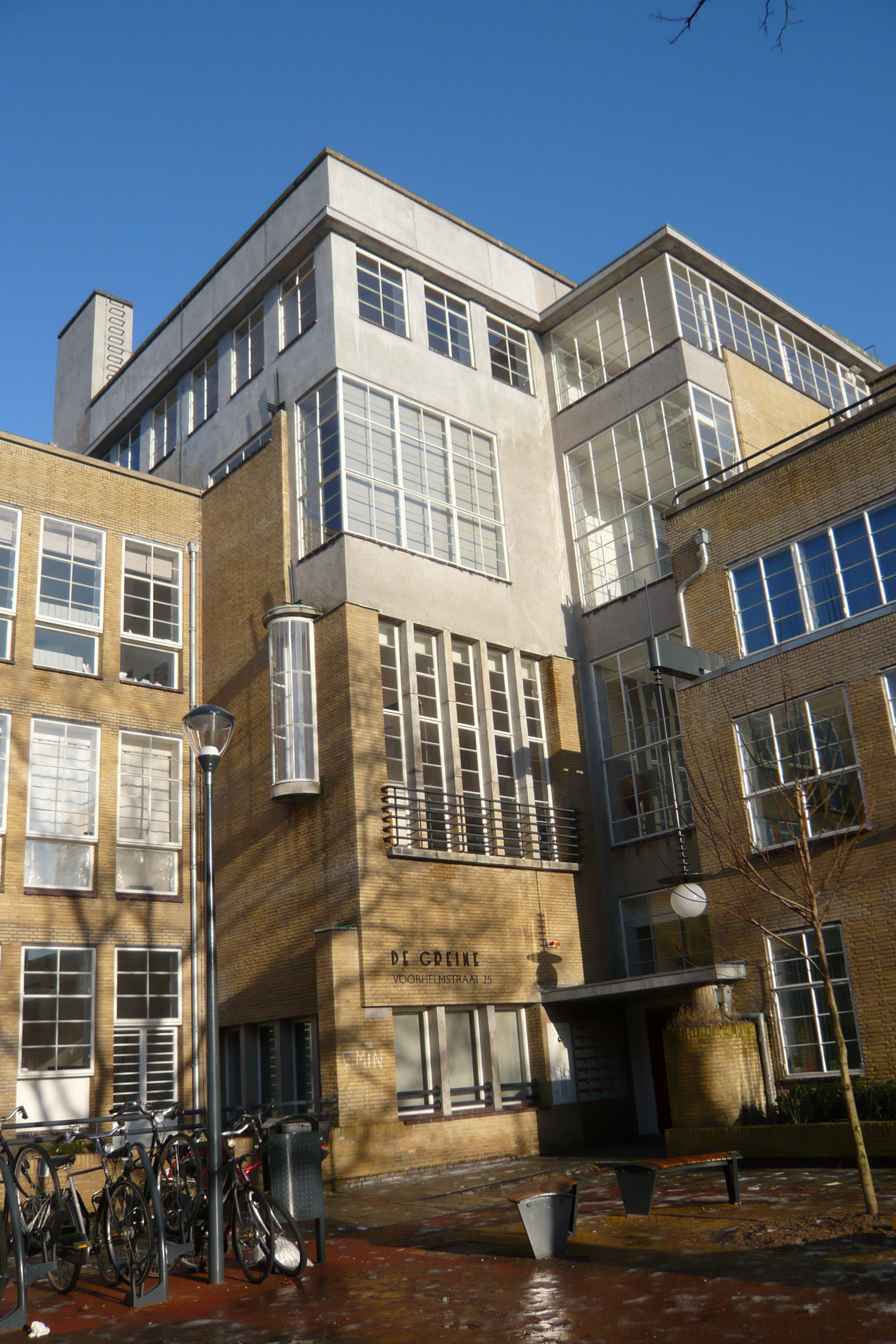
- Entrance to building "De Greine" from the south today
- Schneevoogdstraat (was front door until 1935) and Voorhelmstraat, Haarlem, Netherlands

Information
- Type: Public Vocational school
- Established: 1901
- Enrollment: 1000

The Haarlemse Huishoud en Industrieschool is a former huishoud school on the Voorhelmstraat, Haarlem, Netherlands. It is the oldest public day school for girls in Haarlem, built in 1901, which was renovated in 1935. It is currently rented as separate units for small businesses.

== History ==
The school has its origin in the privately run Wilhelmina-Naaischool, a sewing school for girls 12 years and older, and was first housed on Klein Heiligland 8. It moved to a larger building, on Gierstraat 136 rood, in 1896. In 1889 it moved to a building on the Nieuwe Gracht. The number of students grew from 30 in 1894 to around 100 in 1897.

When the law for compulsory education (leerplicht) was passed in 1900 for children aged 6–12, the organizations supporting the school were dissolved and a new one started, and reopened in 1901, just around the corner from the Ambachtsschool for boys on the Kamperstraat. It was called the "Eerste Haarlemsche Huishoud- en Industrieschool", or "Household School". The Huishoud school offered a three-year education and "extra classes", including waiting tables, ironing, sewing, and cooking. The extra classes were paid separately. For example the cooking class for children cost 1 guilder and fifty cents, but the meal could be eaten afterwards.

According to Johannes Bernardus van Loghem, writing in the architectural weekly Architectura, the school had been quite dark and depressing with its old northern entrance with little light, and it served 1000 girls in 1935, when it was renovated by the architect Dick Greiner. It also contained several small "family kitchen" rooms for cooking classes, and washing nooks for laundry.

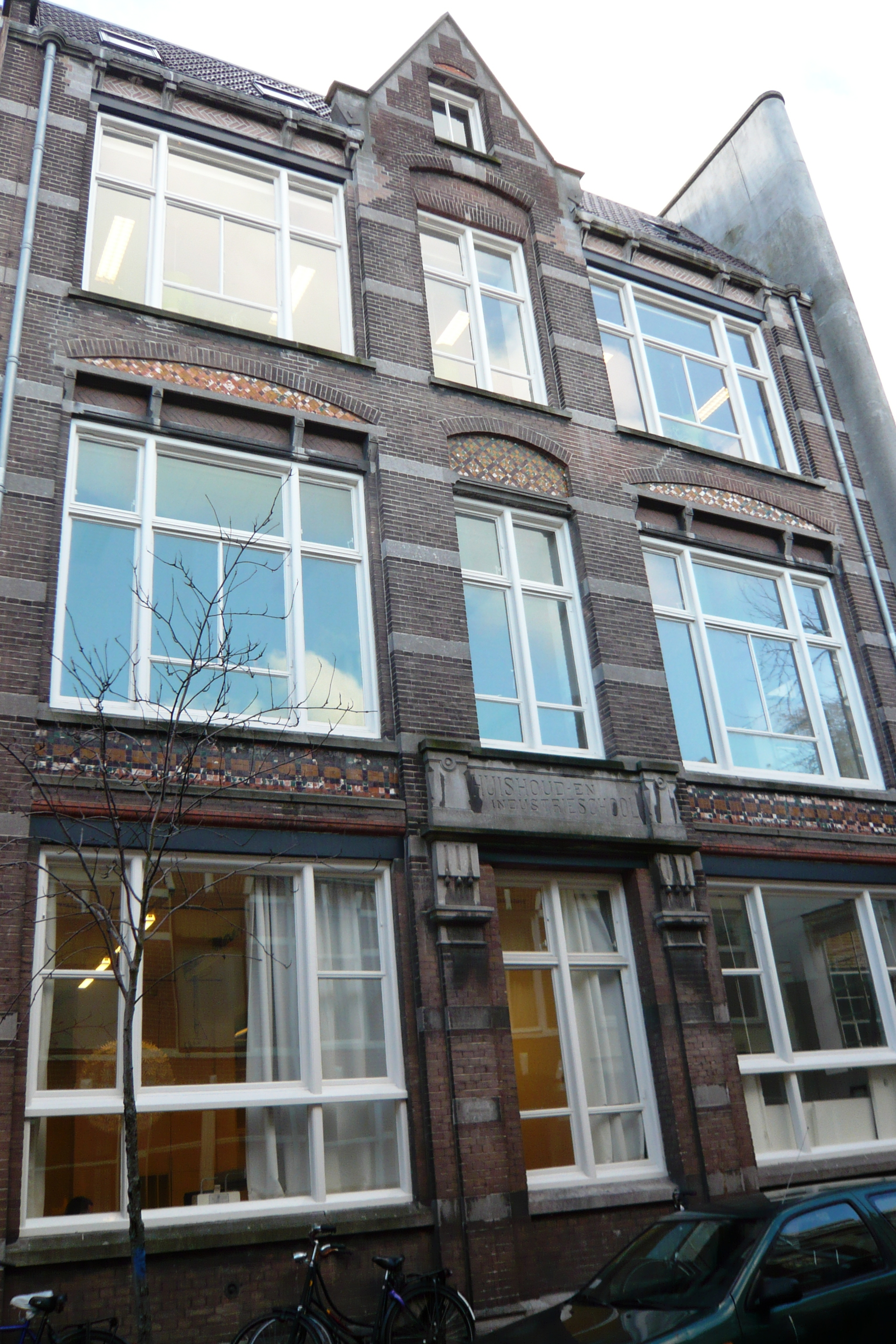
Original northern entrance on Schneevoogtstraat, hidden from view from the east by 1935 wall (right). Old name "Huishoud- en Industrieschool" carved above former main entrance, now a window.

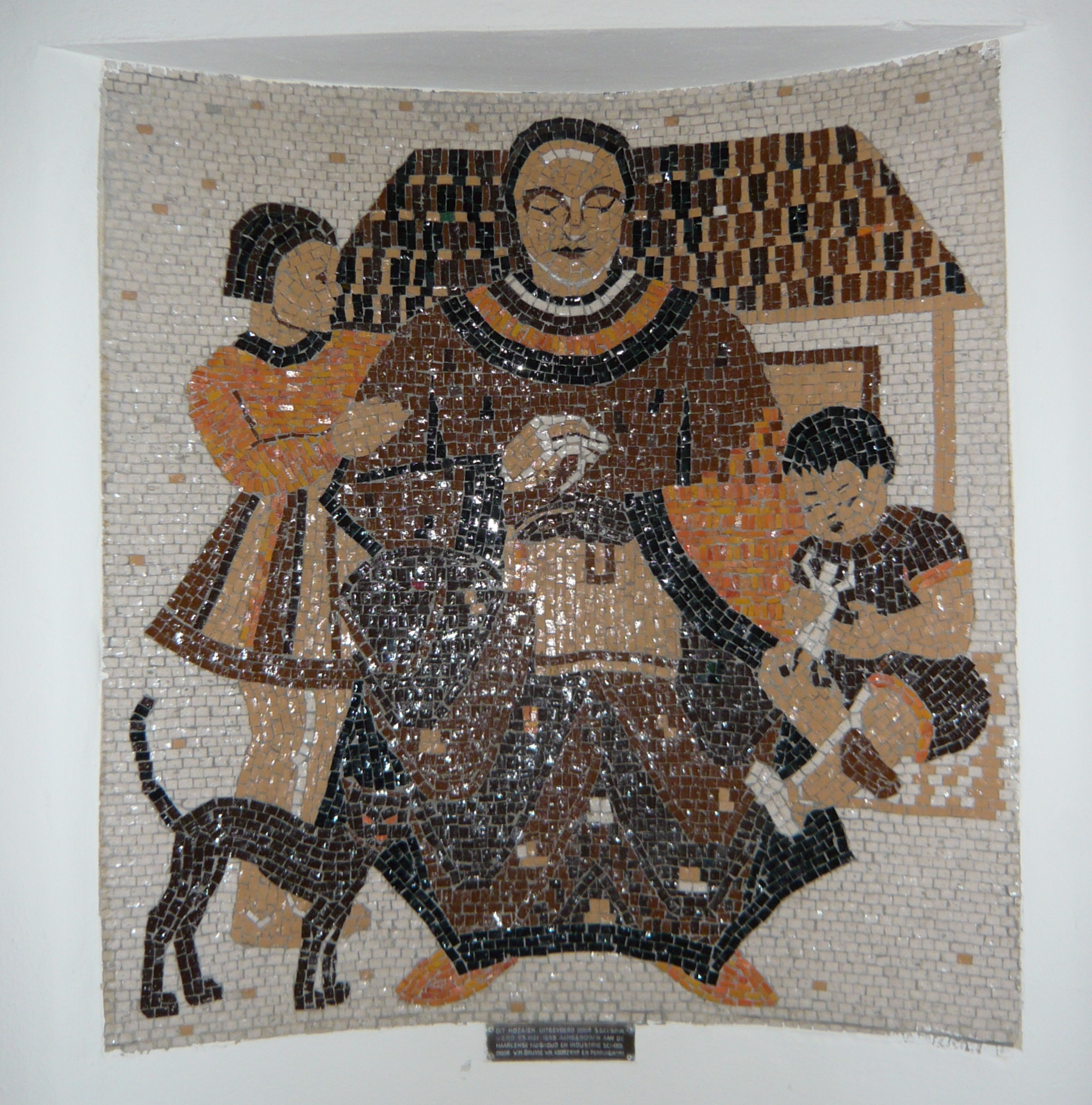
Mosaic commemorating the 1935 expansion illustrating the "ideal housewife" with two children, a house and a cat, by glass-artist Femmy Schilt-Geesink

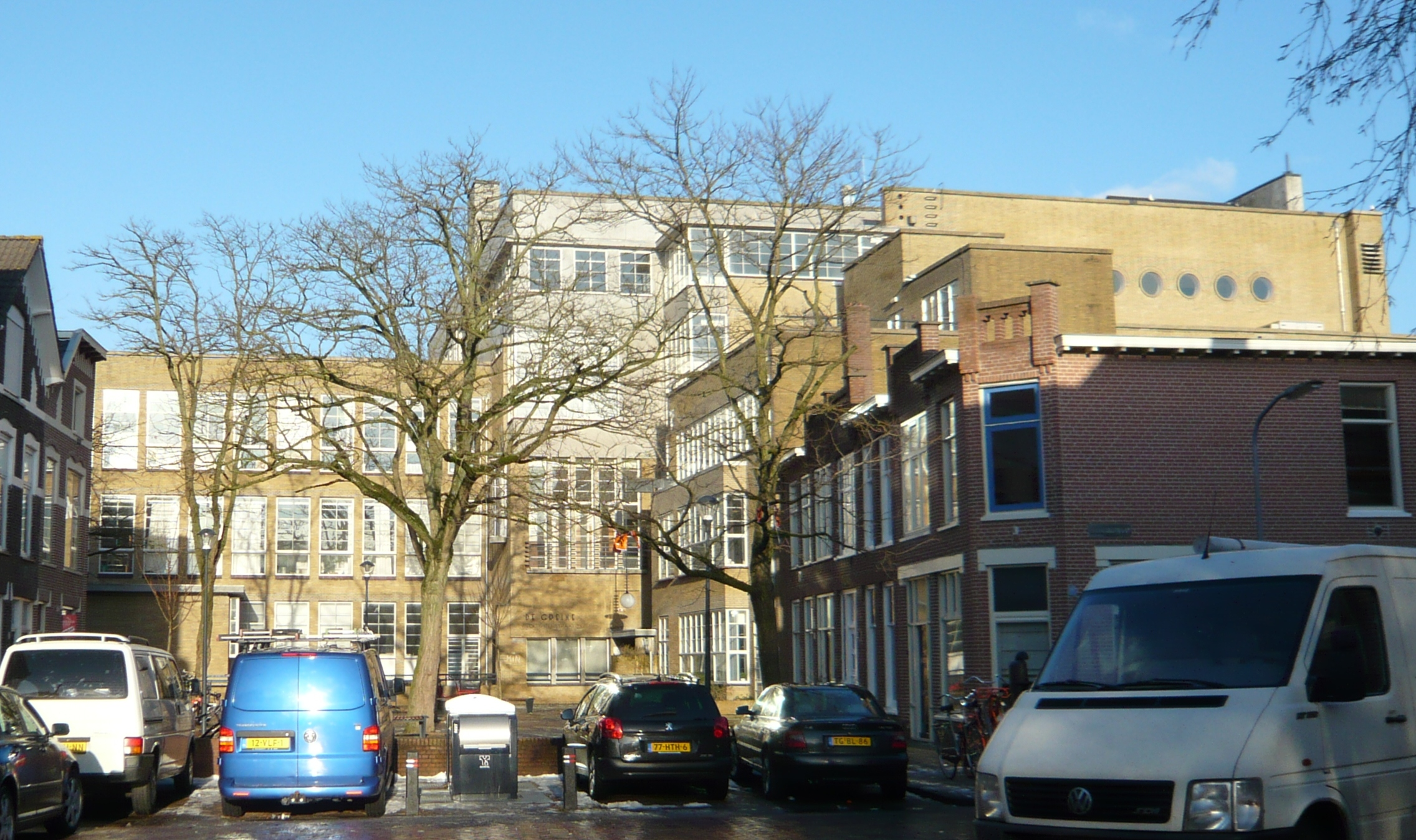
Entrance seen from the south

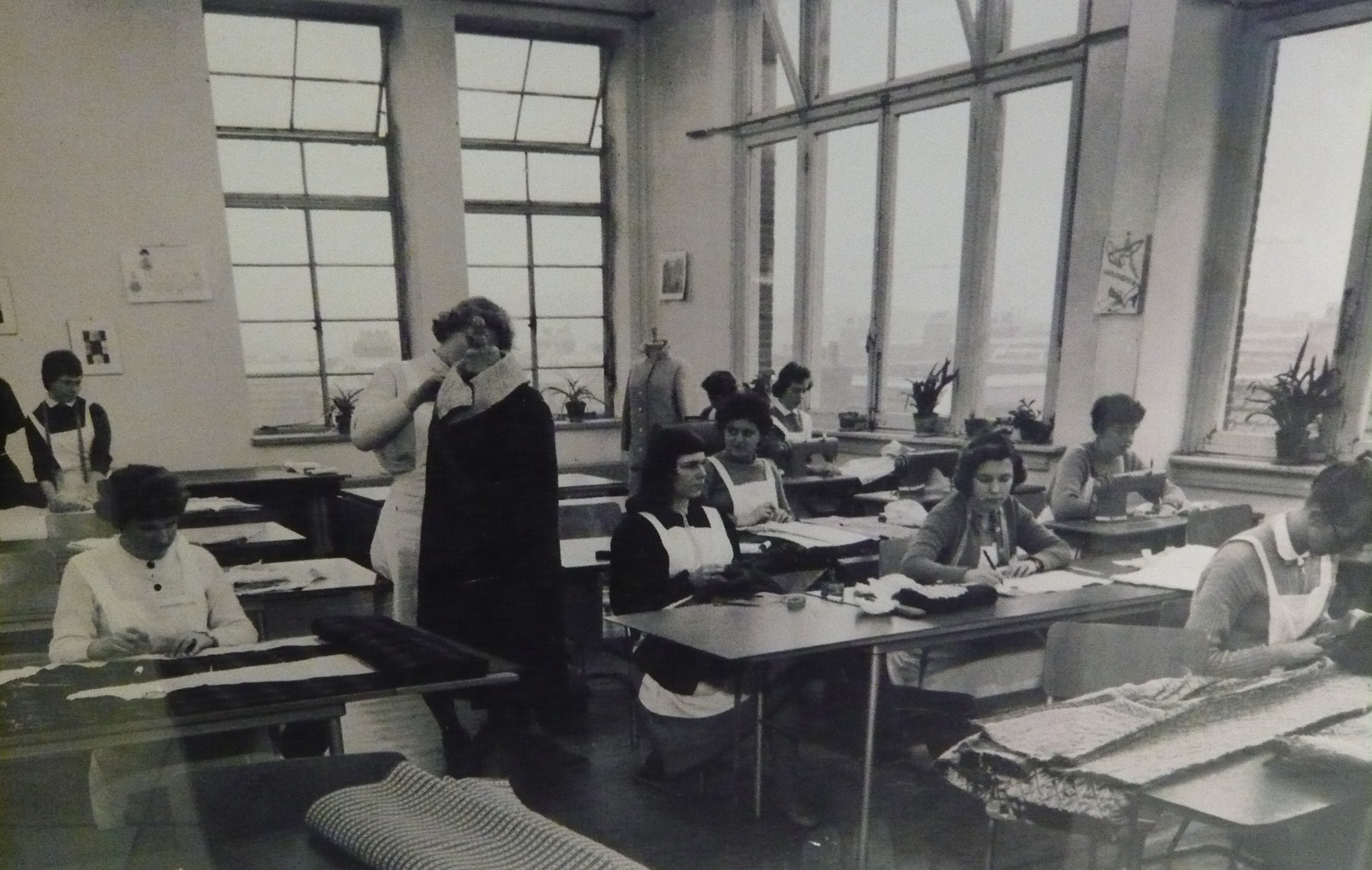
Sewing class, 1935-1940

In 2010 the school and its history was one of the subjects at the Historisch Museum Haarlem's exhibition "Leren voor het Leven" (learning for life), a compilation of materials from various vocational schools in the Haarlem area.
