= Isaac da Costa =

Dutch writer; Jewish poet

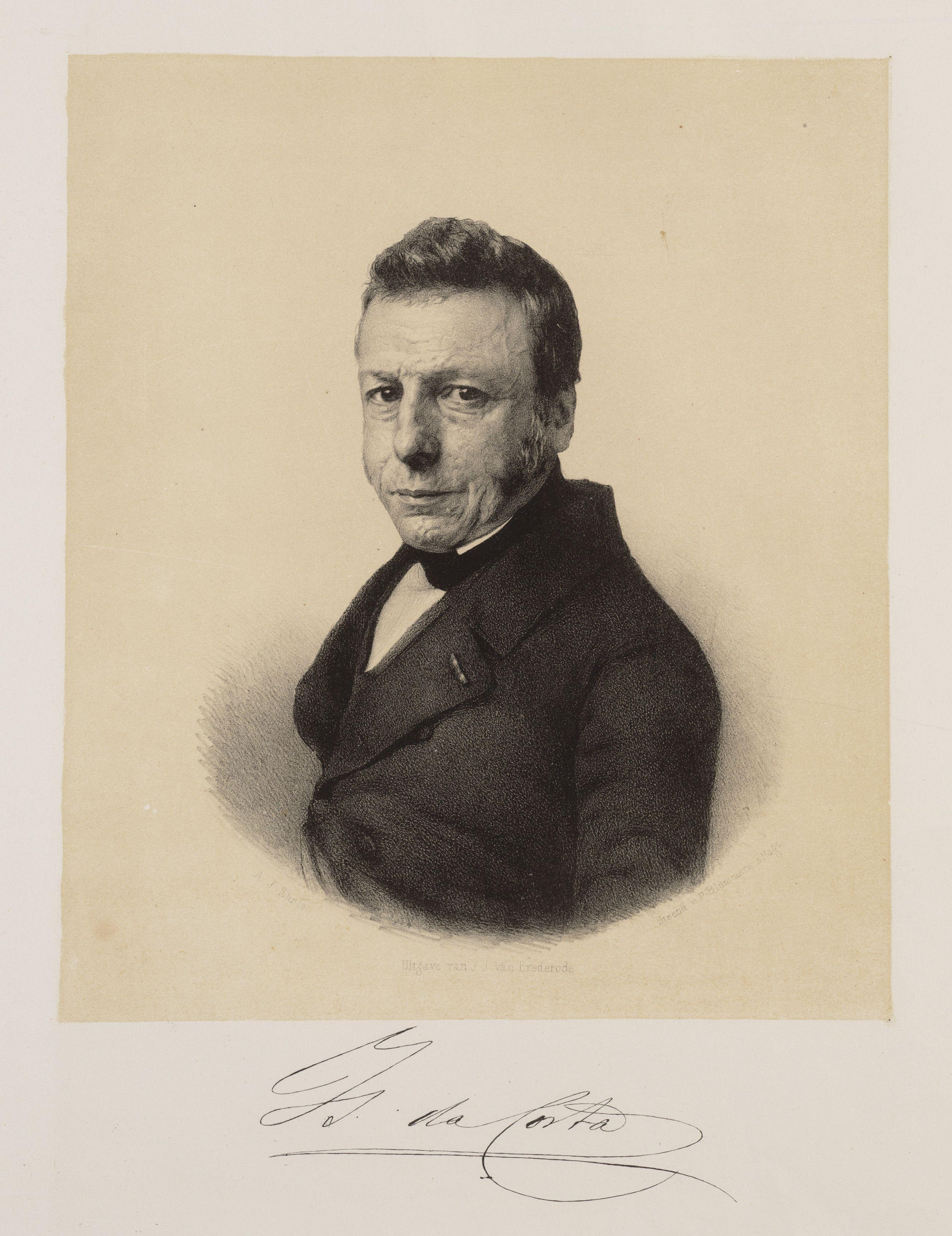
- Born: 14 January 1798; Amsterdam
- Died: 28 April 1860 (aged 62); Amsterdam
- Writing career
- Genre: poetry

Isaäc da Costa (14 January 1798 – 28 April 1860) was a Jewish Dutch poet.

Da Costa was born in Amsterdam in the Netherlands. His father, an aristocratic Sephardic Portuguese Jew, Daniel da Costa, a relative of Uriel Acosta, was a prominent merchant in the city of Amsterdam; his mother, Rebecca Ricardo, was a sister of the English political economist David Ricardo. Daniel da Costa, soon recognizing his son's love for study, destined him for the bar and sent him to the Latin school from 1806 to 1811. Here Isaäc wrote his first verses. Through his Hebrew teacher, the mathematician and Hebraist Moses Lemans, he became acquainted with the great Dutch poet Willem Bilderdijk, who, at the request of Isaäc's father, agreed to supervise the boy's further education. Bilderdijk taught him Roman law, and a familiar intercourse sprang up between them, which afterwards developed into an intimate friendship.

In 1817, Da Costa went to Leyden, where he again saw much of Bilderdijk. There he took his degree as doctor of law in 1818, and as doctor of philosophy on 21 June 1821. Three weeks later, he married his cousin, Hannah Belmonte, who had been educated in a Christian institution, and soon after, at the instance of Bilderdijk, he was baptized with her at Leyden. At that time, he was already well known as a poet. After Bilderdijk's death, Da Costa was generally recognized as his successor among Dutch poets. He was a faithful adherent of the religious views of his friend, was one of the leaders of the Orthodox Reformed party, and during the last years of his life was a teacher and a director of the seminary of the Independent Scotch Church. However severely his religious views and efforts were censured, his character, no less than his genius, was respected by his contemporaries. Although he wrote much on missionary matters, he is distinguished from many other converts in that, to the end of his life, he felt only reverence and love for his former coreligionists, was deeply interested in their history, and often took their part. |thum

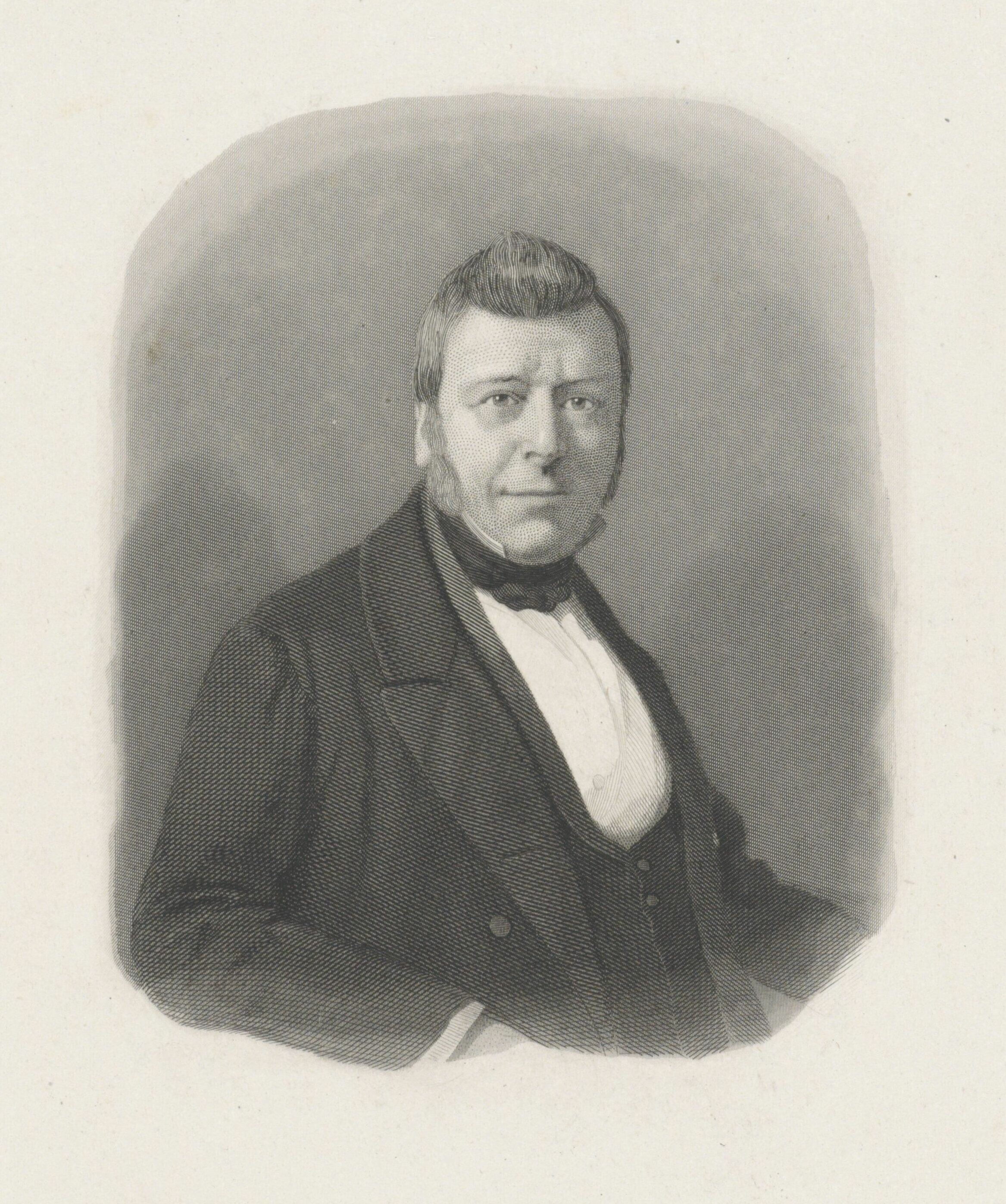
Isaäc da Costa

Aside from his fifty-three longer and shorter poems, Da Costa wrote largely on theological subjects. He also wrote "Israel en de Volken" (2d ed., Haarlem, 1848–49), a survey of the history of the Jews to the nineteenth century, written from the standpoint of the Church. The third volume, dealing with the history of the Spanish-Portuguese Jews, is especially noteworthy on account of the mass of new material used. The work was translated into English, under the title "Israel and the Gentiles," by Ward Kennedy (London, 1850), and into German by "A Friend of God's Word" (Miss Thumb), published by K. Mann (Frankfort-on-the-Main, 1855).

Da Costa's two papers, "The Jews in Spain and Portugal" and "The Jews from Spain and Portugal in the Netherlands," which appeared in 1836 in the "Nedersche Stemmen over Godsdienst, Staat-Geschied-en Letterkunde," may be considered as preliminary to the history. Of interest also are his works on the Von Schoonenberg (Belmonte) family ("Jahrb. für Holland," 1851) and on "The Noble Families Among the Jews" ("Navorscher," 1857, pp. 210 et seq., 269 et seq.; 1858, pp. 71 et seq.; 1859, pp. 110 et seq., 174 et seq., 242 et seq.). Da Costa possessed a valuable library which contained a large number of Spanish, Portuguese, and Hebrew manuscripts, as well as rare prints from the Spanish-Portuguese Jewish literature. It was sold at public auction a year after his death. A catalogue of the library, compiled by M. Roest, was published at Amsterdam in 1861.

== Works ==
- Vijf-en-twintig Jaren ("Twenty-five years")
- De Slag bij Nieuwpoort ("The Battle of Nieuport")
- Alfonsus de Eerste
- Poëzy
- Bezwaren tegen den geest der eeuw. In this essay, written in 1823, only 25 years old, he attacked the Encyclopaedists, Rousseau, Voltaire, Diderot, Kant, Robert Owen and Lord Byron.
- De Sadduceën
- Paulus, eene schriftbeschouwing
- Opmerkingen over het onderscheidende karakter der Groninger School
- Hagar
- Israël en de Volken; een overzicht van de geschiedenis der Joden tot op onzen tijd ("Israel and the Gentiles: Contributions to the History of the Jews From the Earliest Times to the Present Day")
- Een en twintig dagen te Londen, bij gelegenheid der zamenkomsten van de Evangelische Alliantie, doorgebracht
- Beschouwingen van het Evangelie van Lucas
- Bilderdijk herdacht
- Beschouwingen van de Handelingen der Apostelen
- Wat er door de Theologische Faculteit te Leiden al zoo geleerd wordt
- De Mensch en de dichter Willem Bilderdijk, eene bijdrage tot de kennis van zijn leven, karakter, en schriften
- Opstellen van godgeleerden en geschiedkundigen inhoud
- Da C.'s kompleete dichtwerken
- Bijbellezingen. Op geteekend en medegedeeld door Johan Frederik Schimsheimer
- The Four Witnesses: Being a Harmony of the Gospels on a New Principle English trans. by David Dundas Scott
