= Aart van der Leeuw =

Dutch writer

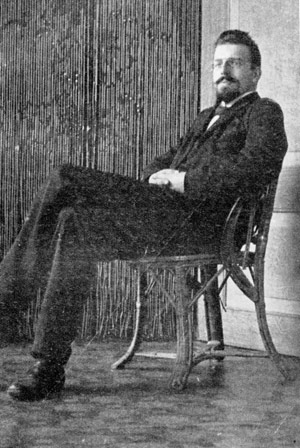
Aart van der Leeuw, 1899; photo by Carel Adama van Scheltema.

Aart van der Leeuw (Dutch pronunciation: [ˈaːrt fɑn dər ˈleːu]; 23 June 1876 – 17 April 1931) was a Dutch writer of prose fiction and poetry. His reputation rests mostly on two novels, Ik en mijn speelman (1927) and De kleine Rudolf (1930).

== Biography ==
Aart van der Leeuw was born in Hof van Delft into a family of notable merchants. He had a strong bond with his mother, whose storytelling was very influential on him; later he read her his stories and poems. His years in elementary school were sad, apparently, and he later wrote about them in Kinderland (1914). He attended the gymnasium in Delft, but he was a dreamer as a child who suffered in the harsh school environment where he was ridiculed. He had little interest in his studies (except for Dutch and history), and on top of that he had health problems, with his eyes and ears, which would plague him throughout his life. All this contributed to his graduating only at age 22, in 1898. He began publishing prose and poetry in his high school years (in the student magazines Vox Gymnasii and Nuntius Gymnasorium—in the latter he published verse inspired by Willem Kloos), and read voraciously; the Tachtigers influenced him greatly, and he became a neo-Romantic of sorts. In addition, he got more critical of his family's Protestantism, but while he would become anti-church, he never became irreligious. In this time period he became friends with Carel Adama van Scheltema and with painter Jan Vogelaar, who soon became a mentor to Van der Leeuw.

He studied law at the Universiteit van Amsterdam for practical purposes; his parents' financial situation was a concern to him, and law offered good social prospects. This proved motivation enough, and he graduated on time, in 1902, and then worked briefly at the city archives of Delft. In 1903 he started as chef de bureau at a life insurance company in Dordrecht. That same year he married his school friend Antonia Johanna Kipp; they had become engaged in 1899. Their marriage remained childless. She is present in many of his early poems and was much interested in mysticism and spirituality; she is credited with shifting Van der Leeuw from skepticism to religiosity, because of her non-dogmatic though Christian-inflected beliefs.

Van der Leeuw hated his job. He had agreed to take the accountancy exam and had to take classes for that; combined with the full work day he had little time left for creative work. In March 1907 he resigned his position, on his doctor's advice, for health reasons, but this turned out to be a blessing in disguise: now he was free to pursue his calling. On top of that, his wife's father died, shortly followed by her mother, and he and his wife moved to Voorburg, where he could devote himself to playing the violin, reading, and writing. They lived there until his death at age 54.

In February 1931 he fell ill with pneumonia and pleurisy, and never recovered. He died on 17 April, and was buried in Voorburg, with a modest ceremony. A family member read his poem "Mijn vaders tuinen" at the gravesite.

== Work ==
The novella Sint-Veit was his literary debut; published in 1908 in Albert Verwey's magazine De Beweging, it had been written years before, in Dordrecht. He published also in De Gids and De Nieuwe Gids, but was less interested in the naturalist writers than he was in those of a more symbolist quality. Van der Leeuw began publishing poetry in 1909 and until 1926 published four collections. He also published three collections of short stories, four prose fiction books, critical prose, and some translations. Very much isolated in Voorburg and loath to mingle in the literary world, his friend Van Schendel helped him prepare a number of his books for publication, including Liederen en Balladen (1910), Kinderland (1913), and Herscheppingen (1916). He traveled abroad only when his friends gifted him a trip to Italy for his 50th birthday, a trip he credited with prompting him to write Ik en mijn speelman, a typically neo-Romanticist book that thematizes the relationship between beauty and reality (influenced, Van der Leeuw said, by 17th-c spiritual writer and mystic Thomas Traherne) and chooses beauty over reality. In his next book, De kleine Rudolf (1930), there is an attempt to reconcile dream and reality, and now reality is accepted, with romanticism being sought in life, not outside of it. In 1928 he was awarded the C.W. van der Hoogtprijs by the Maatschappij der Nederlandse Letterkunde for Het aardsche paradijs (1927).

== Bibliography ==
- Sint Veit (1908)
- Liederen en balladen (1911)
- Kinderland (1914)
- Herscheppingen (1916)
- Sint-Veit en andere vertellingen (1919)
- De mythe van een jeugd (1921)
- Opvluchten (1922)
- De gezegenden (1923)
- Vluchtige begroetingen (1925)
- De zwerftochten van Odysseus (1926)
- Het aardsche paradijs (1927)
- Ik en mijn speelman (1927)
- De kleine Rudolf (1930)
- De opdracht (1930)
- Verspreid proza, nagelaten (1932)
- Die van hun leven vertelden (1934)
- Vertellingen (1935)
- Momenten van schoonheid en bezinning (1947)
- Verzamelde gedichten (1950)
- De briefwisseling tussen P.N. van Eyck en Aart van der Leeuw, bezorgd door Piet Delen (1973)
