= Henriette Roland Holst =

Dutch poet and communist (1869–1954)

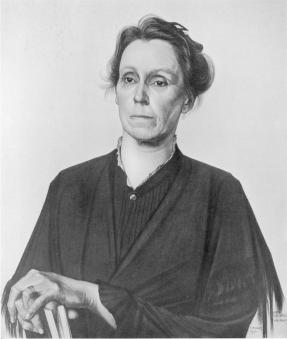
- Portrait of Roland Holst by Michel de Klerk (1921)
- Born: Henriette Goverdine Anna van der Schalk; 24 December 1869; Noordwijk, Netherlands
- Died: 21 November 1952 (aged 82); Amsterdam, Netherlands
- Other names: Henriette Goverdine Anna Roland Holst-van der Schalk; Jet
- Occupations: Poet; activist
- Political party: Social Democratic Workers' Party; Communist Party of the Netherlands
- Movement: Christian communism; council communism
- Spouse: Richard Roland Holst (m. 1896; died 1938)

Henriette Goverdine Anna "Jet" Roland Holst-van der Schalk (Note: Some sources spell her name as Henriëtte, with a diaeresis, but her birth certificate gives her name without the diaeresis, as do most sources. Her nickname was Jet, and because of her relationship to the poet Adriaan Roland Holst she was often referred to as "Tante Jet" ("Aunt Jet").) (24 December 1869 – 21 November 1952) was a Dutch poet and Council communist. She was nominated for the Nobel Prize in Literature.

She had many noted relatives. Her husband was the artist Richard Roland Holst. The poet Adriaan Roland Holst (1888–1976), nicknamed "the Dutch Prince of Poets", was the nephew of her husband.

== Early life ==
Born in Noordwijk on 24 December 1869, Roland Holst was brought up in the affluent, liberal Christian family of the notary Theodore Willem van der Schalk and Anna Ida van der Schalk-van der Hoeven. Roland Holst attended four years of boarding school in Velp and studied French in Liege.

Roland Holst soon came to develop a talent as a poet. She married the artist Richard Roland Holst in 1896 and befriended the poet Herman Gorter, who prompted her to read Das Kapital by Karl Marx. Around this time she became politically active and began her career as a writer on political, historical and philosophical fields.

== Poetry ==
Around 1890, Henriette met Albert Verwey, who with Willem Kloos was among the leaders of the Tachtigers and the founders of De Nieuwe Gids. In 1892 she met the painter Jan Toorop. She wrote about Toorop and Verwey in her first sonnets. In these poems she showcased her intense needs as an artist, more precisely: as a poet.

== Socialism ==
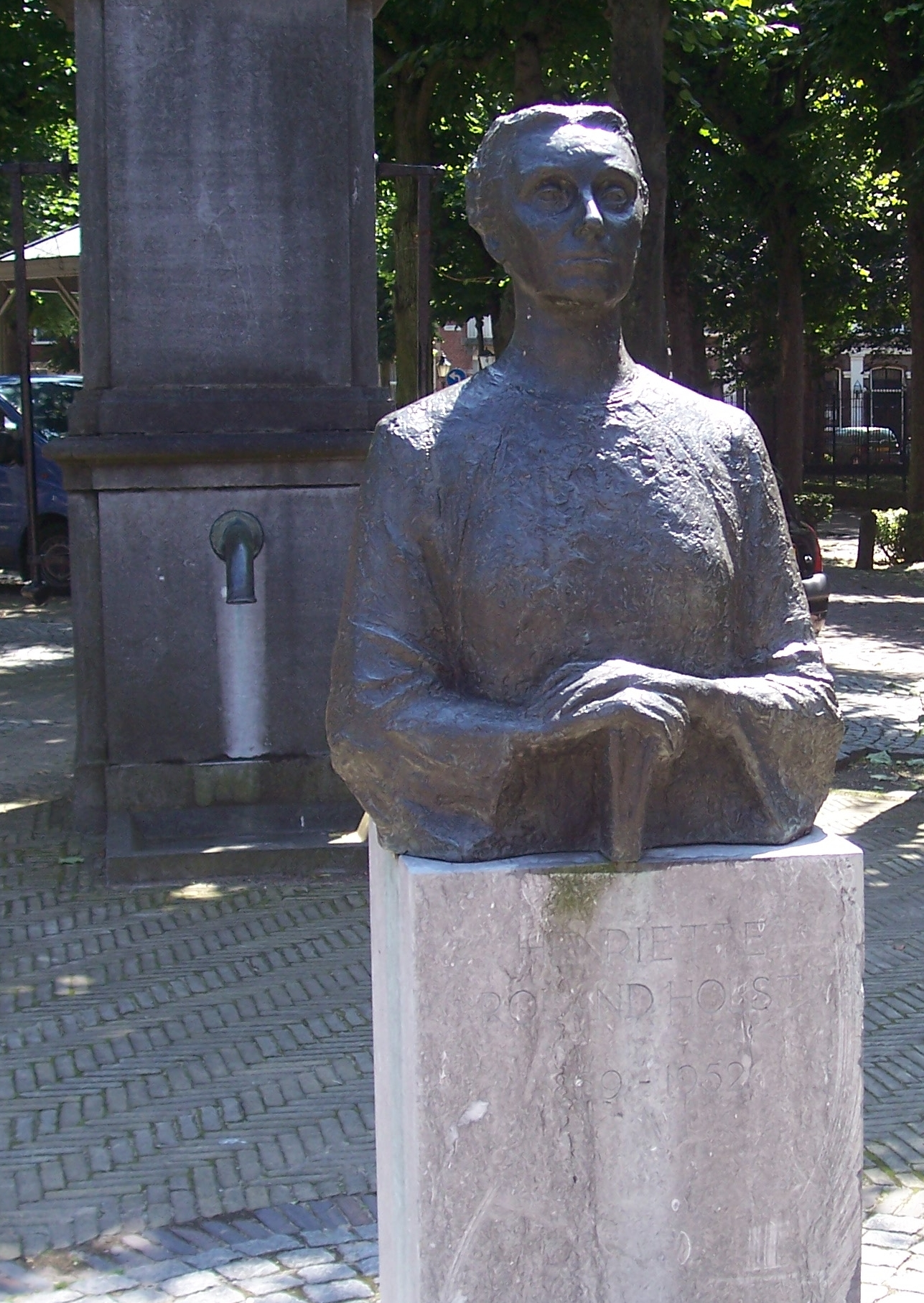
Bust of Henriette Roland Holst at the Lindenplein, Noordwijk

At the age of 27 Roland Holst joined the SDAP. She was then working night after night in smoky halls calling for workers' struggle to improve their miserable fate. She became part of the party leadership and, in 1900, was delegated to the Second International. At the conferences of the International, she came into contact with prominent Marxists such as Karl Liebknecht, Rosa Luxemburg, and Leon Trotsky.

In 1911, Roland Holst had joined as an orthodox Marxist in the SDAP. Unlike most other orthodox Marxists, she did not immediately move over to the Social-Democratic Party (SDP, later known as the Communist Party of the Netherlands [CPN]). Against the advice of Rosa Luxemburg in some years she remained non-partisan. She founded in 1915, along with a number of SDAP and SDP members, the Revolutionair Socialistische Vereeniging. While in the CPN, she sided with Herman Gorter, Anton Pannekoek, and the left communist fraction of the party.

"Rode Jet" (meaning "Red Jet", a nickname of Roland Holst) also played a role during the revolutionary turmoil of November 1918. On 13 November she went with David Wijnkoop at the head of a procession on the Orange-Nassau barracks in Amsterdam, to celebrate the brotherhood with the hussars. Intervention by the security forces resulted in two dead, the only victims of the "revolution that did not happen".

== 1928–1952: Christian socialist ==
Henriette had deep slumps. She suffered from depression, bouts of anorexia, anemia and heart disease but when she was well she struggled with an unrelenting zeal to improve the position of workers, youth, and women.

Her first poems were passionately for socialism. She wrote among other things, the Dutch text for the anthem "The Internationale". Later, her work took a more religious character. Among her writings were plays, biographies (of Rousseau, Gandhi and Tolstoy), journalism, and radio plays.

During the Second World War she was active in the Dutch resistance, as editor of the resistance magazine De Vonk, then De Vlam. Though of a well to do background, she was certainly not a "salon socialist".

At the end of her life she wrote the autobiography Het vuur brandde voort. She died in Amsterdam on 21 November 1952 at the age of 82. A bust was placed in her memory in her birthplace of Noordwijk in 1969.

== Works ==
=== Poetry collections ===
- het Jeugdwerk (1884–1892) (was published in 1969 by Garmt Stuiveling).
- Sonnetten en Verzen in Terzinen geschreven; original edition (graphical treatment by Richard Roland Holst) and Scheltema Holkema's Bookshop, Amsterdam, 1896.

Reprinted in simpler form of being. WL and J. Brusse, Rotterdam in 1913 and 1922 and out. BZZTôH, The Hague 1983.

=== Political work ===
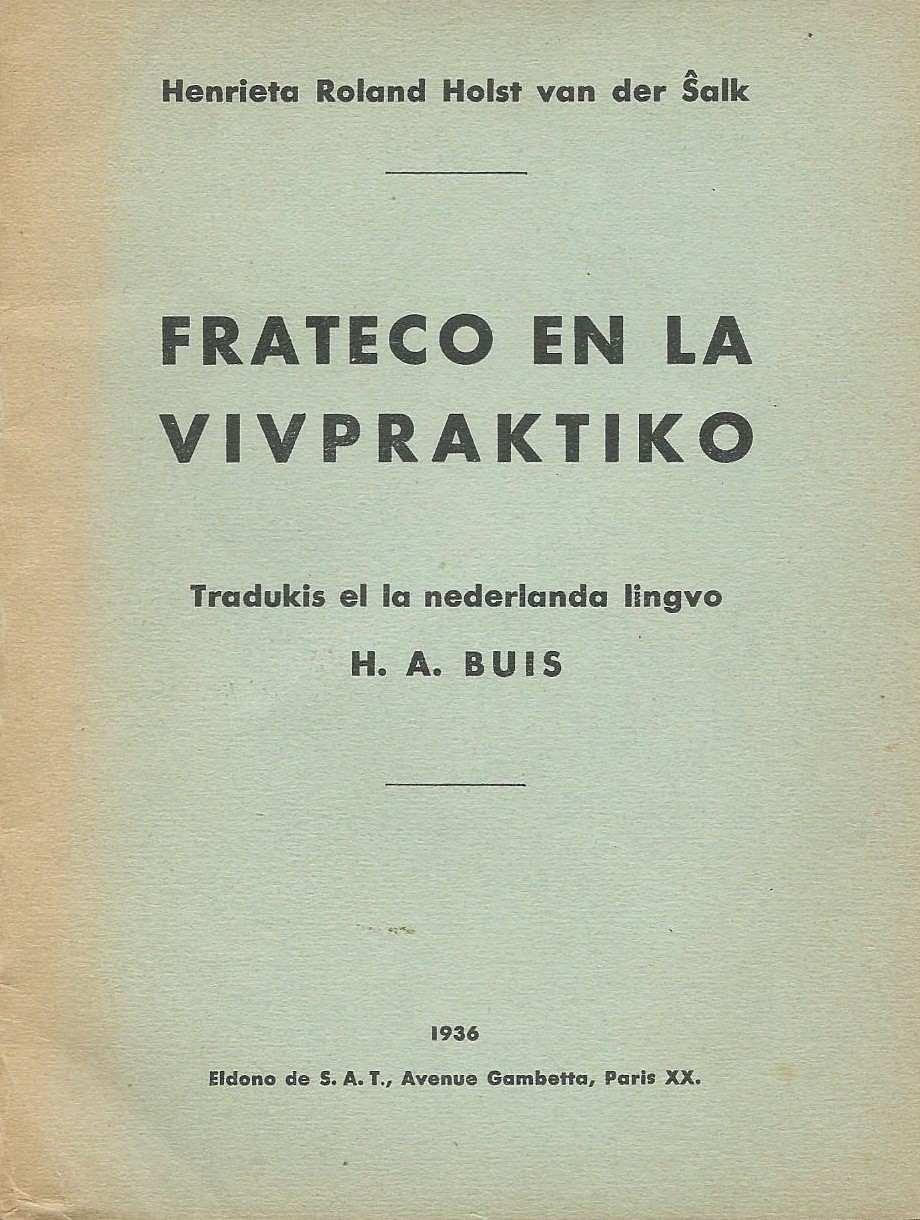
Frateco en la Vivpraktiko, translation of work of Henriette Roland Holst in Esperanto.

- Kapitaal en Arbeid in Nederland, Amsterdam 1902.
- De groote spoorwegstaking, de vakbeweging en de SDAP, Den Haag 1903.

the Dutch railroad strikes of 1903, and the role of unions and of the SDAP therein.

- Algemeene werkstaking en sociaaldemocratie, Rotterdam 1906.

this work appeared in German in 1905, with a preface by Karl Kautsky.

- Geschiedenis van den Proletarischen Klassenstrijd, H. A. Wakker, Rotterdam, 1909 (Sociale Bibliotheek).
- De opstandelingen, Een lyrisch treurspel in drie bedrijven, Amsterdam 1910.

a lyrical work on the 1905 Russian Revolution.

- De philosophie van Dietzgen en hare beteekenis voor het proletariaat, Rotterdam 1910.

First published in German, translated by Sam de Wolff.

- Revisionistische en Marxistische tactiek in de kiesrecht-beweging, Rotterdam 1910.

polemic against revisionist socialism of Troelstra with regard to voting rights.

- De strijdmiddelen der sociale revolutie, Amsterdam 1918.
- De revolutionaire massa-aktie. Een studie, Rotterdam 1918.
- De daden der Bolschewiki, Amsterdam 1919.

written in defense of the Bolsheviks.

- Verslag van het Derde Internationale Communistische Congres, 1921.

the third congress of the Comintern.

- Uit Sowjet-Rusland, 1921.

description of her trip to the Third International

- Communisme en moraal, Arnhem 1925.
- Herman Gorter, Amsterdam 1933.

biography of Tachtiger Herman Gorter.

- Rosa Luxemburg. Haar leven en werk, Rotterdam 1935.

biography of Rosa Luxemburg.
