= Albert Verwey =

Dutch poet (1865–1937)

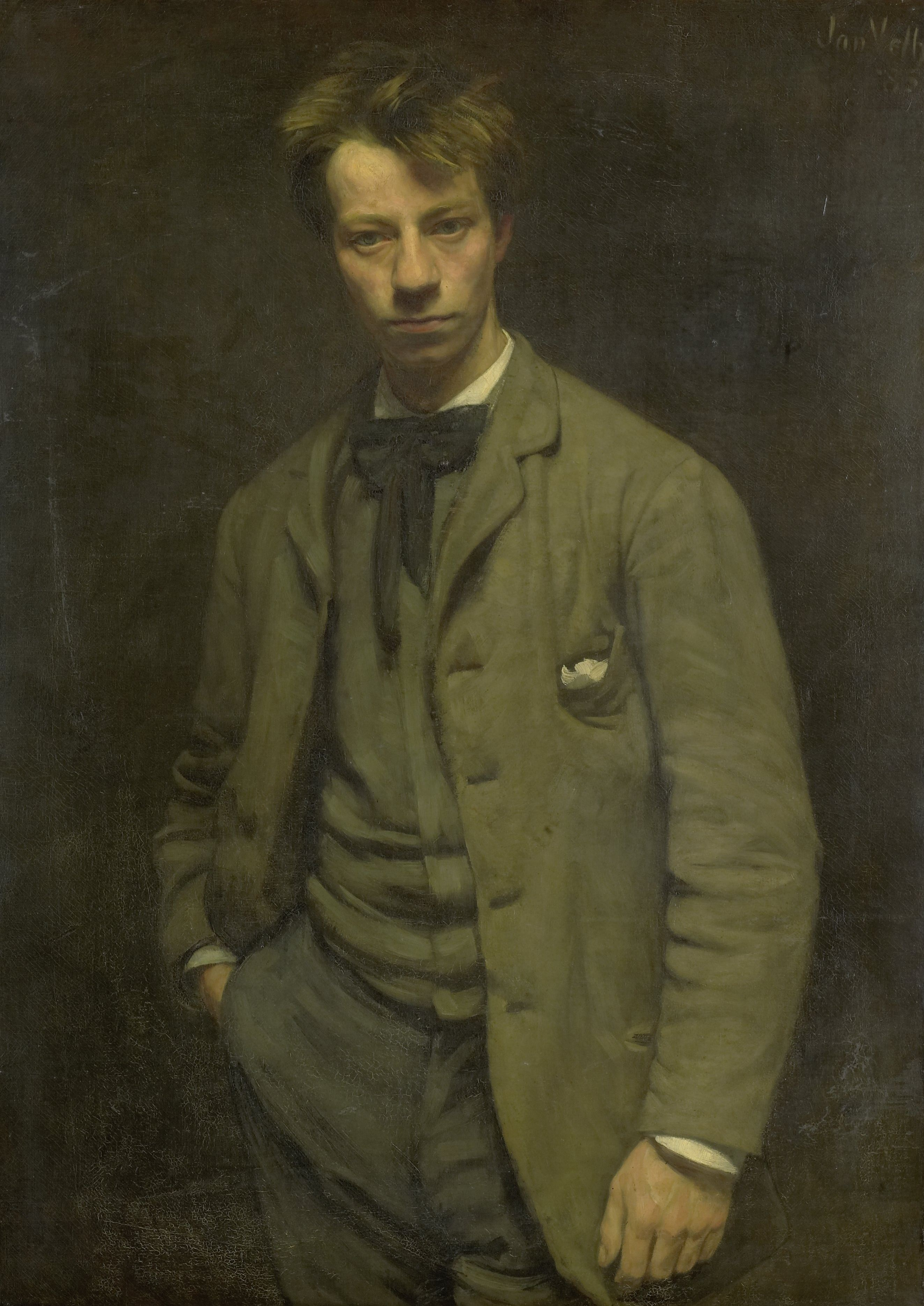
Albert Verwey by Jan Veth (1885)

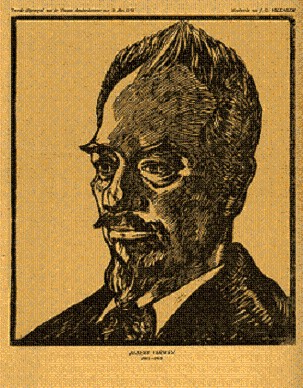
Albert Verwey by Jan Veth

Albert Verwey (May 15, 1865 – March 8, 1937) was a Dutch poet belonging to the Tachtiger movement, so called after the number [18]80, eighty. As a translator, magazine editor, and literary historian he played an important role in the literary life of The Netherlands in the late 19th and early 20th centuries.

Verwey was born in the center of Amsterdam; all his life he spoke with a strong local accent. Both his father and grandfather were furniture makers. In his youth, he lost both his parents, caused by tuberculosis. Verwey began to write poetry early in life. In 1880 he translated poems by Samuel Coleridge, Byron, Shelley, and Wordsworth. After finishing high school Verwey worked at a securities office. Because Verwey was very good in English, the 18-years-old Verwey was invited by the Dutch directors of the Maxwell Land Grant to join them as translator to Cimarron, New Mexico. His first book of poems, titled Persephone after the Greek goddess, was published in 1883. In 1885 he was a co-founder of the periodical De Nieuwe Gids (“The New Guide”), the chief magazine of the Dutch literary revival of the 1880s. Verwey contributed sonnets and other poetry. In 1888 his translation of Gulliver's Travels was published.

Verwey was a close friend of the prominent 'Tachtiger' poet Willem Kloos, and a love affair developed between the two poets, that was unprecedented in Dutch literature. Their relation ended in 1888. In 1889 he failed his Latin examinations. In the same year, his collected poems were published for the first time, with added translations of Christopher Marlowe.

In 1890 Verwey married and moved to a house called Villa Nova in Noordwijk aan Zee. Novelist, poet and psychiatrist Frederik van Eeden became his brother-in-law. Verwey was involved in the decoration of the Beurs van Berlage, a "synthesis of the arts". For a time he was influenced by Spinozism and Socialism through his wife. Since 1895 he was friends with the esoteric German poet Stefan George, whose work he translated. In some of his poems, Verwey reflected on the horrors of the World War One; Verwey held Germany responsibly and refused to accept George's later ideas about a spiritual aristocracy. From 1924 till 1935 Verwey was a professor at the Rijksuniversiteit Leiden. Verwey translated and promoted medieval poetry in search of passion, vision, and dreams.

Although no Dutch writer has ever won the Nobel Prize in Literature he is among the Dutch writers to have been nominated by multiple people. Verwey was a prolific writer; apart from his 25 volumes of poetry and three separate 'collected poems' his prose works were published in ten volumes designed in art-deco. At the University of Amsterdam his carefully kept correspondence (of 20,000 letters) can be consulted.

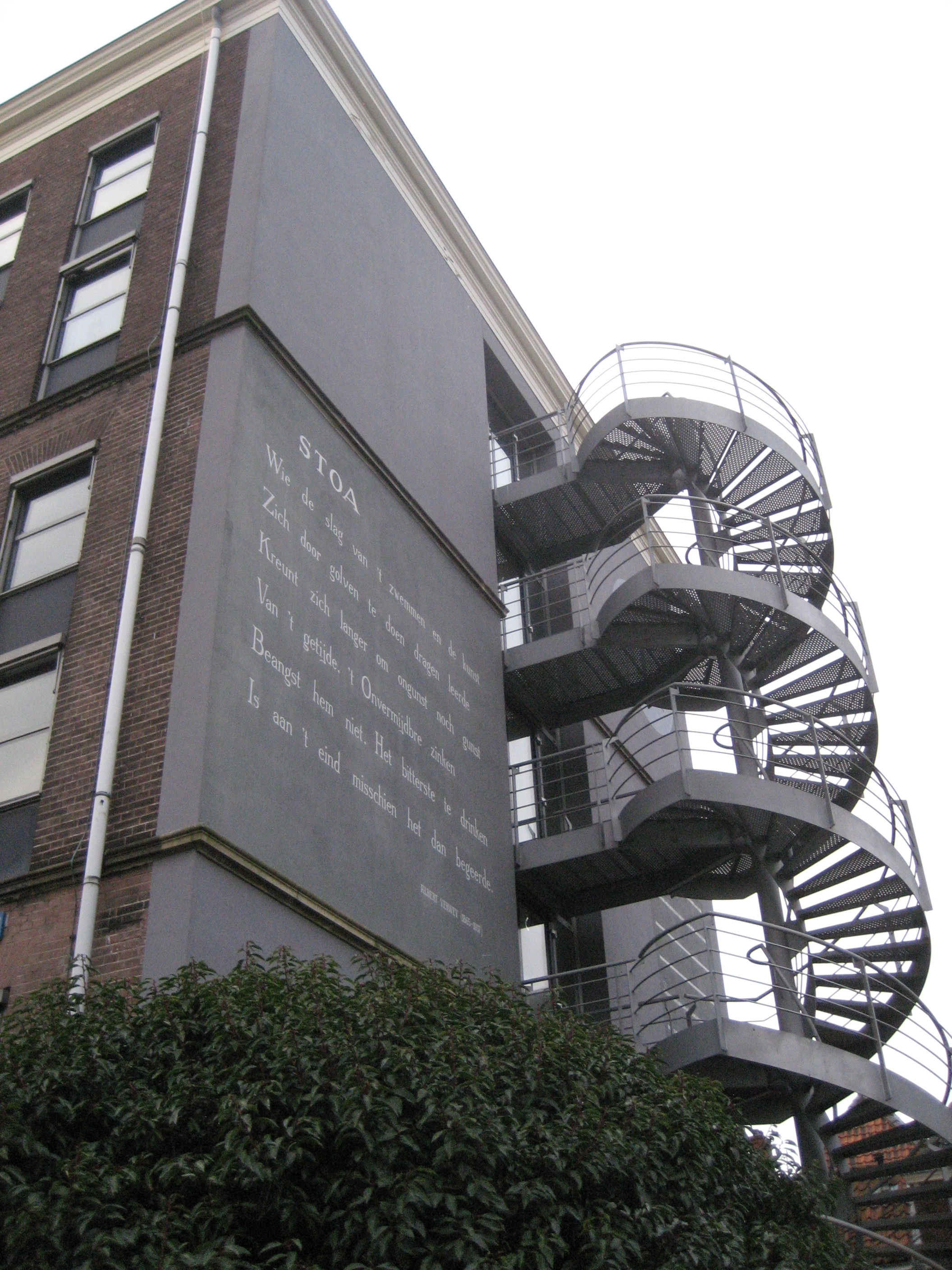
'Stoa', wall poem in Leiden

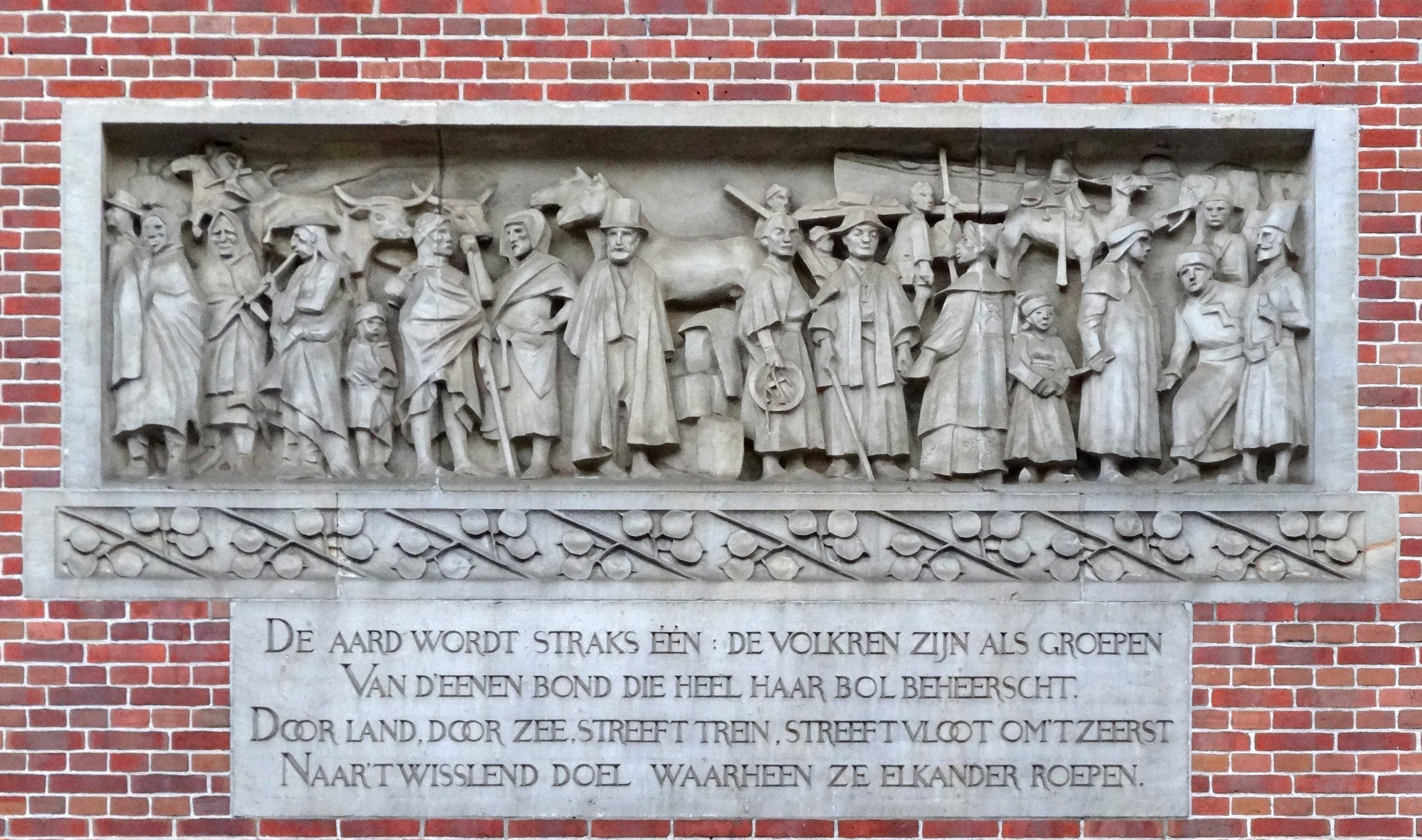
Poem on the Beurs van Berlage, the Amsterdam commodity exchange

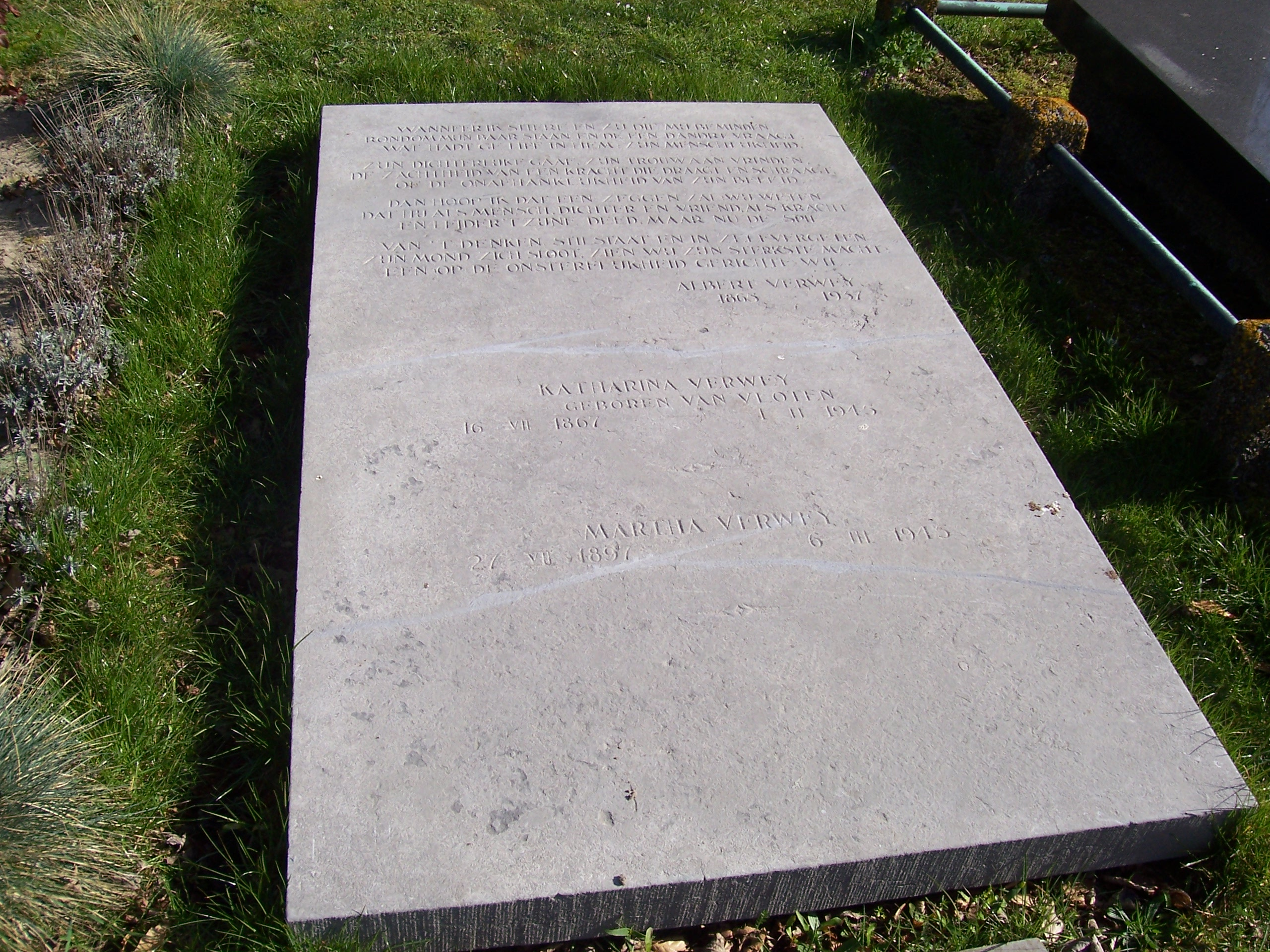
Tomb in Noordwijk

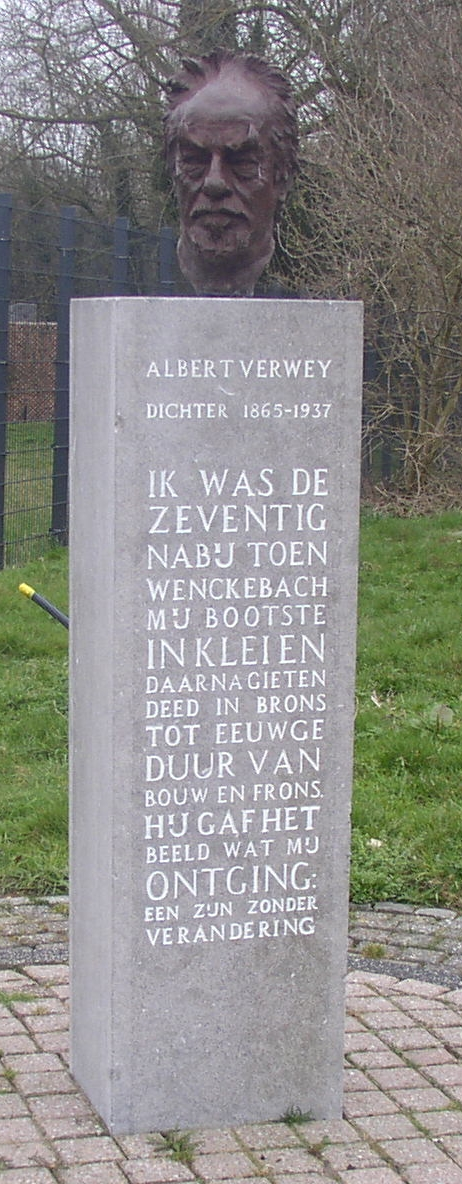
Bust in Noordwijk
