= Herman Liebaers =

Belgian linguist

Herman Liebaers (February 1, 1919 in Tienen, Belgium – November 9, 2010 in Jette, Brussels) was a Belgian linguist. He was director general of the central Belgian Royal Library and Marshal of the Royal Household of the Royal Court of Belgium.

== Education ==
He obtained a master's degree in literature from Ghent University in 1942 and a Ph.D. in 1955 at the same university.

== Career ==
In 1943, he started working at the Royal Library of Belgium in Brussels (Albertina). During the war he was captured by the Nazis and imprisoned in the concentration camps of Breendonk and Huy. In 1950, he spent 6 months in the U. S. with a Fulbright scholarship and worked a few weeks at the Library of Congress. From 1951 until 1956, he was also Assistant Secretary of the Belgian American Educational Foundation. In 1954, he moved on to become the librarian of the European Organization for Nuclear Research (CERN).

In 1956, he returned to the Royal Library in Brussels, being appointed its director general, and helped oversee the establishment of its new permanent secretariat in The Hague. From 1969 until 1974, he was president of the International Federation of Library Associations (IFLA), and subsequently honorary president. He was an editor and biographer of the 19th-century poet Hélène Swarth.

From 1973 until 1981, he was Marshal of the Royal Household of king Baudouin I of Belgium. He was the first Dutch speaking Fleming in this post. Other Flemings had preceded him but were French-speaking members of the old nobility.

In 1976, he was awarded American Library Association Honorary Membership.

== Personal life ==
He was married to Isa Hereng. They had a son, Dirk, and a daughter Inge Liebaers, who was a professor of genetics at the Vrije Universiteit Brussel.

== Bibliography ==
- Hélène Swarths Zuidnederlandse jaren, Ghent, 1964.
- Hélène Swarth. Brieven aan Pol de Mont, Ghent, 1964
- Liebaers on Libraries and the 37th Session of IFLA in Liverpool, Wilson Library Bulletin, 45, 10, 950–951, June 1971
- Book promotion through libraries, New Delhi: Federation of Publishers and Booksellers Associations in India, 1973
- The impact of American and European librarianship upon each other, Chicago, 1977
- Small Talk about Great Books, Delivered on the Occasion of the 7^{th.} Annual Bromsen Lecture, Boston, Mass., May 12, 1979.
- Mostly in the line of duty: thirty years with books, The Hague, Boston, London, Martinus Nijhoff Publishers, 1980
- Rond de Brusselse Warande, Brussels, 1988
- Autour Du Parc De Bruxelles, Brussels, 1988
- Books over bombs, IFLA in Moscow, August 1991
- Koning Boudewijn in spiegelbeeld, Van Halewyck, 1998
- Beyond Belgium, Van Halewyck, 2003
