= Richard Roland Holst =

Dutch artist

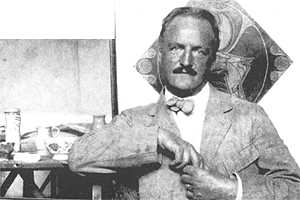
Richard Roland Holst (1910)

Richard Nicolaüs Roland Holst (4 December 1868, Amsterdam – 31 December 1938, Bloemendaal) was a Dutch painter, draftsman, lithographer, book cover designer, etcher and writer. Many of his works were in a modified Symbolist style.

== Life and work ==
His father, Adriaan Roland Holst, was a manufacturer and underwriter. His nephew, also named Adriaan Roland Holst, was a well known poet. From 1885 to 1890, he studied at the Rijksakademie van Beeldende Kunsten with August Allebé, among others. After 1918, he was teacher there and served as Director from 1926 to 1934.

In 1896, he married the poet and revolutionary, Henriette van der Schalk. Along with his wife, Holst was a socialist and a close friend of the leftist writer, Herman Gorter. Later in his life, he was in a relationship with fellow artist Debora Duyvis from about 1926 until his death.

Holst made numerous woodcuts, designed posters, and provided illustrations for Henriette's works, as well as designing the typography. Although most of his works were small in scale, he also created murals for the Beurs van Berlage, the office of the General Diamond Workers' Union of the Netherlands (known as the "Burcht van Berlage"), and the building of the Supreme Court of the Netherlands in The Hague. Later, he designed stained glass windows for St. Martin's Cathedral, Utrecht and several public buildings.

Holst attached great importance to collaborations between artists from different disciplines, and is often referred to as a "community artist". He was heavily influenced by the ideas of the writer, William Morris; treating art as an idealistic, service-oriented activity that emphasized purity and clear form. This influence may have been reflected in his harsh criticism of Johanna van Gogh-Bonger while she was organizing an exhibition of the works of Vincent van Gogh, her brother-in-law, in 1892:

Mrs Van Gogh is a charming little woman, but it irritates me when someone gushes fanatically on a subject she knows nothing about, and although blinded by sentimentality still thinks she is adopting a strictly critical attitude. It is schoolgirlish twaddle, nothing more. [...] The work that Mrs Van Gogh would like best is the one that was the most bombastic and sentimental, the one that made her shed the most tears; she forgets that her sorrow is turning Vincent into a god.

Holst has a statue on the Parnassusweg, on the bridge over the Zuider Amstelkanaal; together with statues of the architect, Hendrik Petrus Berlage, and the sculptor, Joseph Mendes da Costa. They were created in 1940/41 by the sculptor, Hildo Krop, but could not be installed until after the war, due to opposition from the German occupation forces.

== Selected works ==
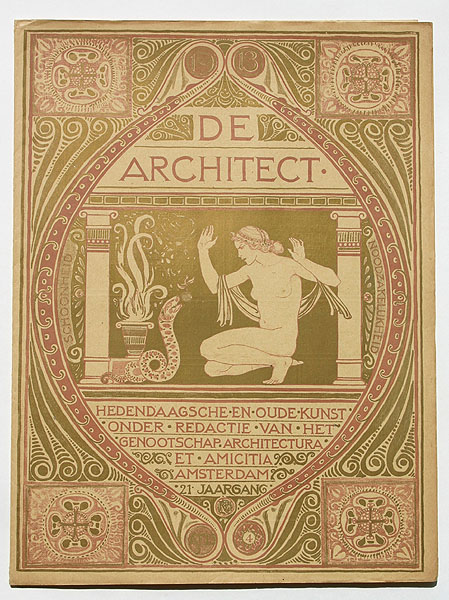
Cover for
De architect

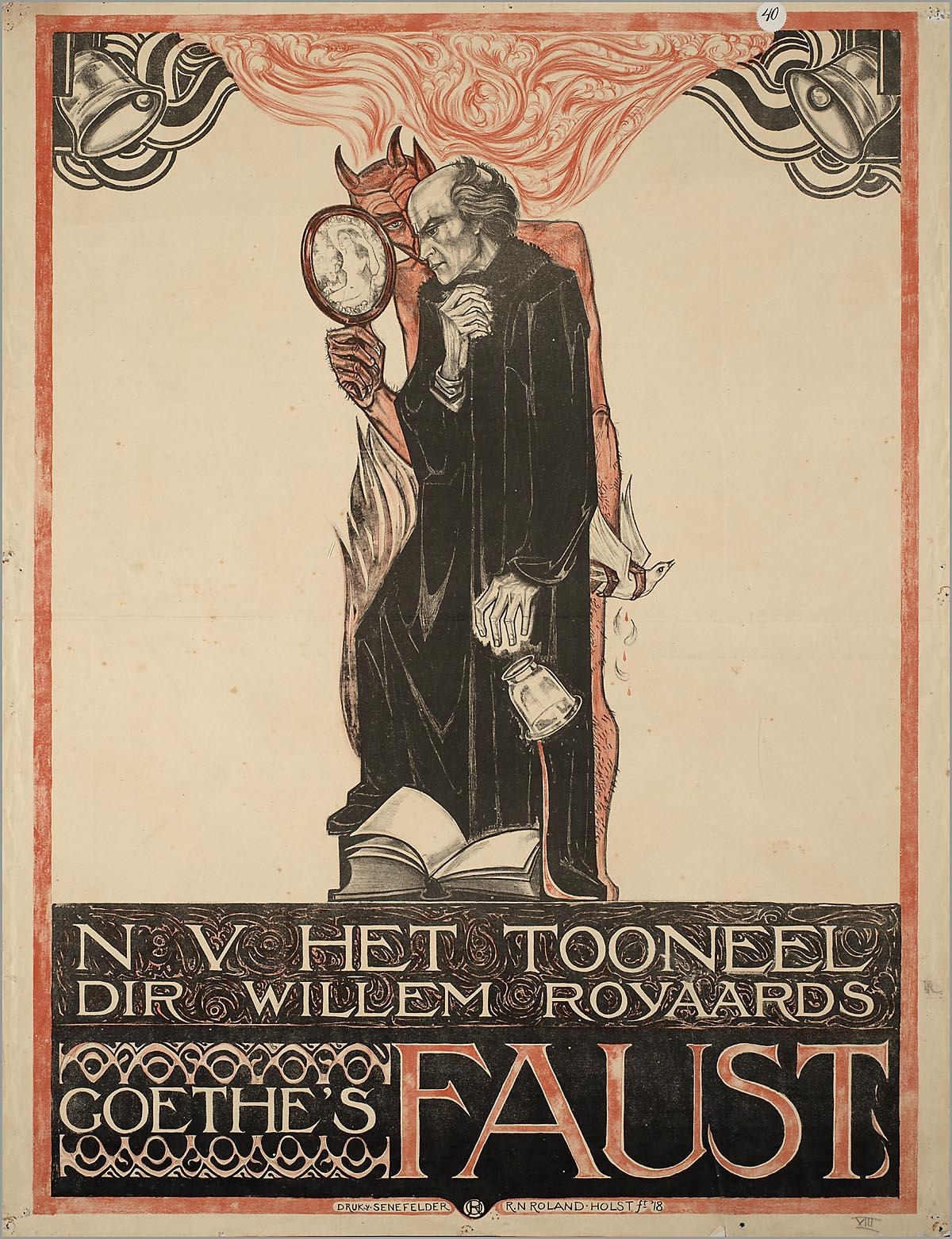
Poster for
Goethe's Faust

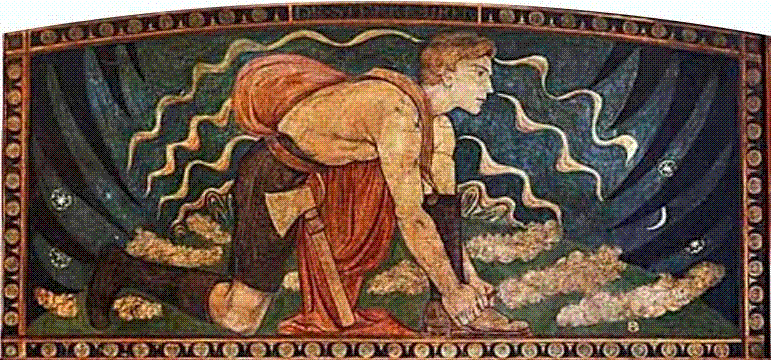
Mural at the Diamond Worker's Union

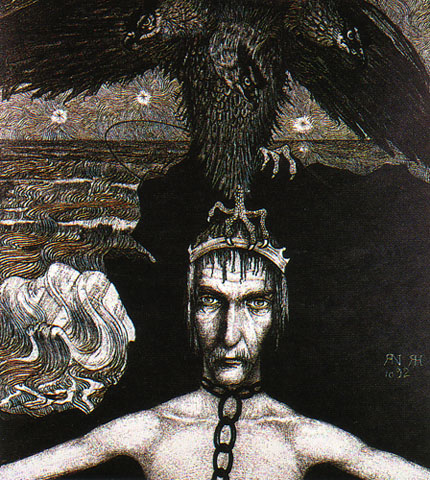
Necessity

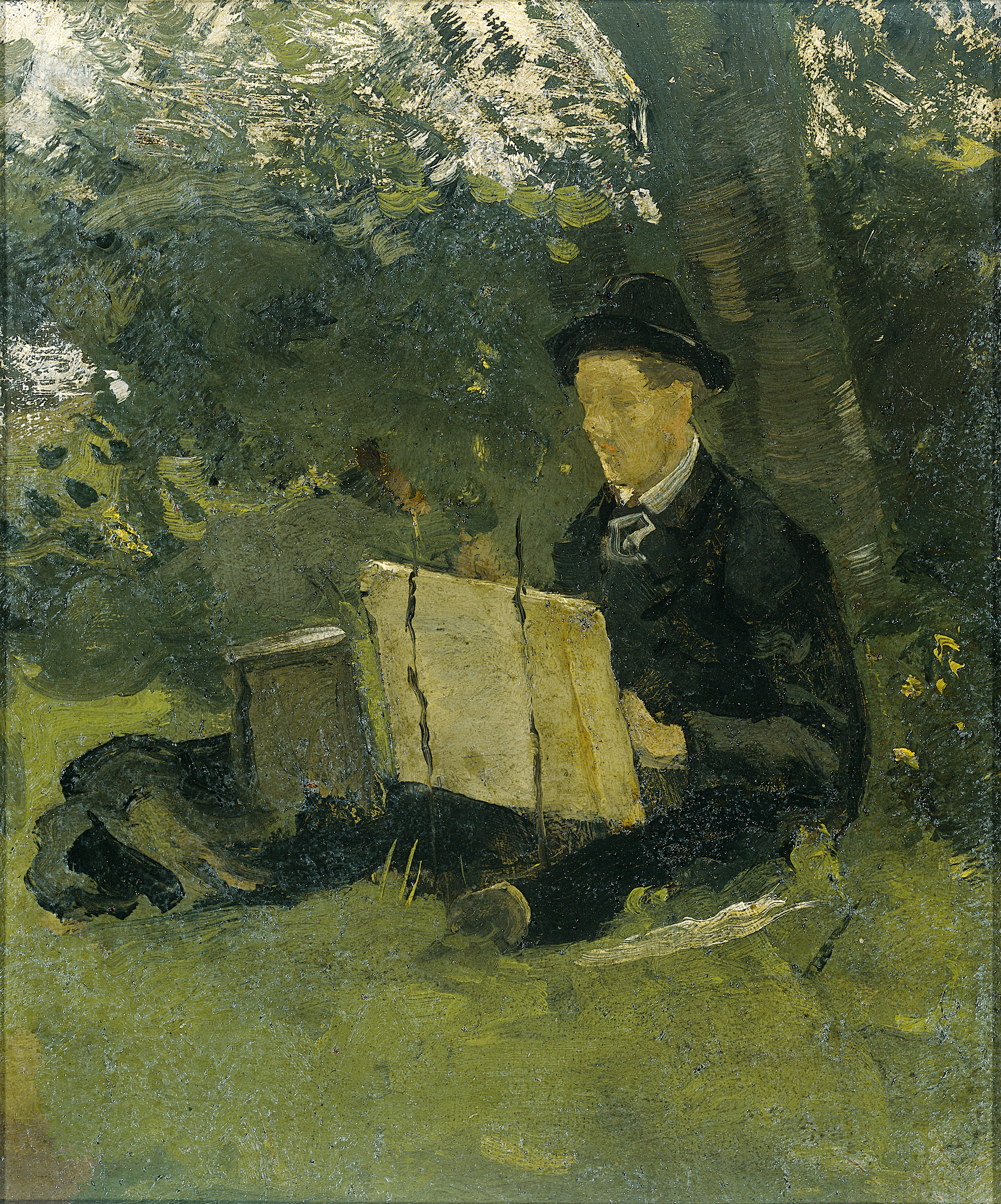
Jan Verkade Painting Under a Tree

== Sources ==
- A.M. Hammacher (1938) "Geteekende portretten en koppen van R.N. Roland Holst", Maandblad Beeldende Kunst jrg. 25, afl. 1
- Roland Holst, H. (1940) "Kinderjaren en jeugd van R. N. Roland Holst", Zeist : Ploegsma.
- Schathorn, P. (1979) "Legaat R. N. Roland Holst"; in: exhibition catalogue, Rijksmuseum, Amsterdam
- Rijnders, M. (1992) R.N. Roland Holst, Amsterdam : Stadsuitgeverij Amsterdam ISBN 90-5366-044-5
- Tibbe, L. (1994) R.N. Roland Holst - Arbeid en schoonheid vereend. Opvattingen over gemeenschapskunst, Amsterdam : Architectura & Natura ISBN 90-71570-39-8
- Heijden, Marien van der, "Biografie Richard Nicolaüs Roland Holst" (Internationaal Instituut voor Sociale Geschiedenis), 10 February 2003.
- Elsbeth Etty & Ron Dirven (2012) Henriëtte & Richard Roland Holst : het boek van de Buisssche Heide, Schiedam : Scriptum Art Books ISBN 978-90-5594-874-1
