= Mei (poem) =

Dutch epic poem by Herman Gorter

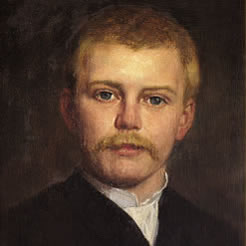
Herman Gorter painted by Thérèse Schwartze

Mei (May) is a poem written by the Dutch poet Herman Gorter and published in 1889. It established Gorter's reputation as a poet and one of the foremost writers of the Tachtigers movement. It is one of the most famous poems in the Dutch language. It has 4,381 lines.

The opening lines are some of the most famous in dutch literature:

| Dutch | English |
|---|---|
| Een nieuwe lente en een nieuw geluid: Ik wil dat dit lied klinkt als het gefluit, Dat ik vaak hoorde voor een zomernacht In een oud stadje, langs de watergracht. | A new spring and a new sound: I want this song to sound like the whistle, That I often heard on a summer's night In an old town, along the water canal. |

The poem was published in De Nieuwe Gids, a poetry journal.

== Translations ==
The poem has been translated into several languages:

- French, translated by Nicolas Ouwehand and published in 2017
- Western Frisian, translated by Klaas Bruinsma published in 1998
- English, translated by M. Kruijff and published in 2021.
