= Jan Veth =

Dutch painter, poet and art critic

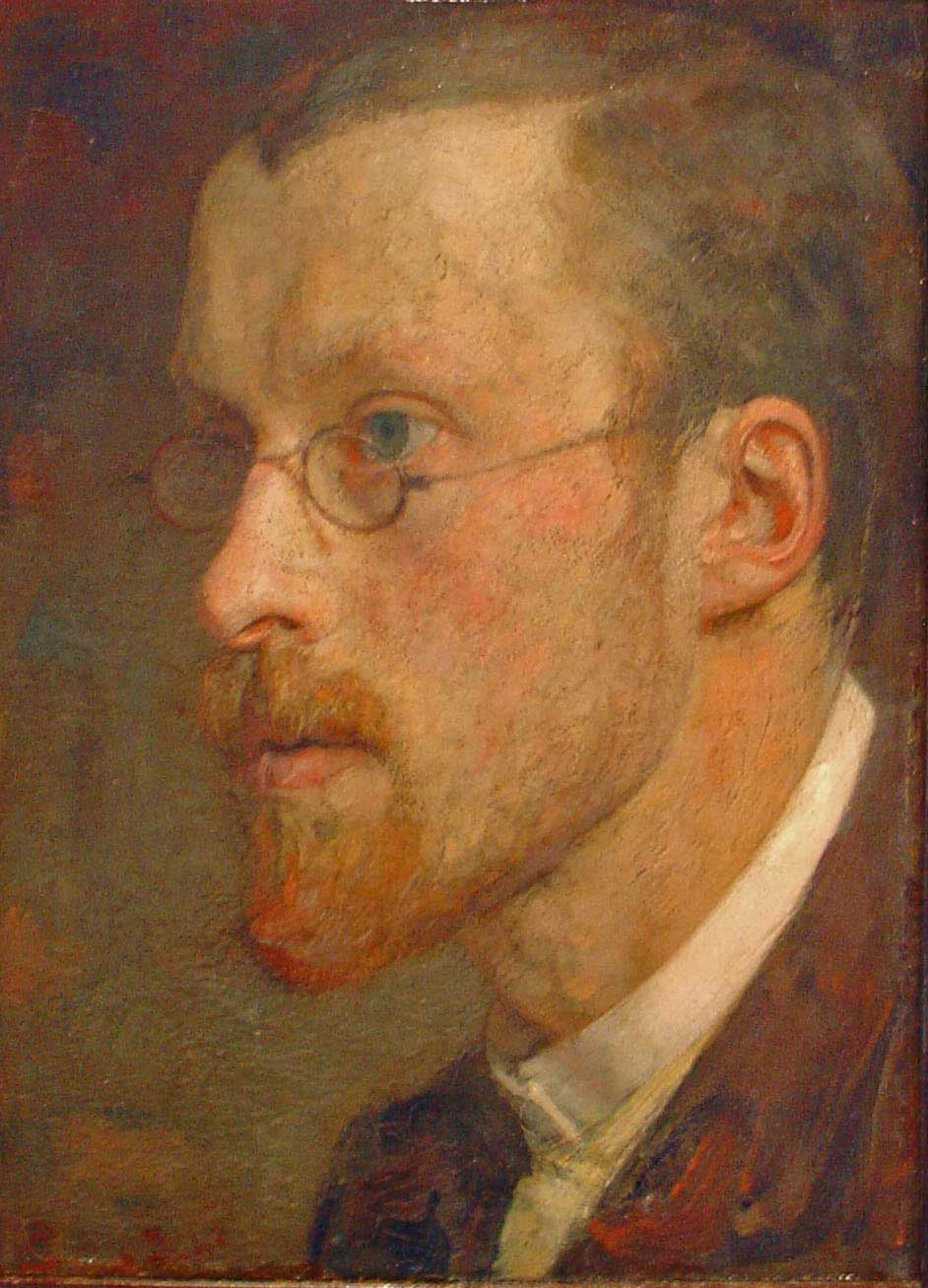
Selfportrait of Jan Pieter Veth

Jan Pieter Veth (18 May 1864, Dordrecht – 1 July 1925, Amsterdam) was a Dutch painter, poet, art critic and university lecturer. He is especially noted as a portrait painter. Amongst his sitters were Max Liebermann, Lambertus Zijl, Frank van der Goes, Antoon Derkinderen and other contemporaries including various fellow painters.

== Biography ==
Jan Veth was the son of Gerradus Huibert Veth, a Dordrecht iron merchant and liberal politician, and Anna Cornelia Giltay. On his mother's side he descended from the Dordrecht painter family of Van Strij (his mother was a granddaughter of Jacob van Strij). He married Anna Dorothea Dirks on 10 August 1888, from which marriage came five children.

Veth received his art education at the Rijksakademie van Beeldende Kunsten in Amsterdam. He was living in the area, called de Pijp. With several of his fellow students he founded the St. Luke group. From 1885 he worked with the painter Anton Mauve in Laren. After his marriage he settled in Bussum. In addition he was a well-known poet, belonging to The Movement of 1880 and publishing work in the De Nieuwe Gids. He designed the cover for "De Kleine Johannes", a book written by his friend, Frederik van Eeden, contributing to the development of book-art in the Netherlands. He was involved in the founding of "Genootschap Amstelodamum" and "Vereniging Hendrick de Keyser". As Professor Extraordinary in History of Art and Aesthetics (1906), he was associated with the Rijksakademie voor Beeldende Kunsten in Amsterdam.

Veth was member of the Royal Netherlands Academy of Arts and Sciences since 1923. In 1923 he moved back to Amsterdam and lived at Keizersgracht 327. Veth died in a hospital.

== Selected works by Jan Veth ==
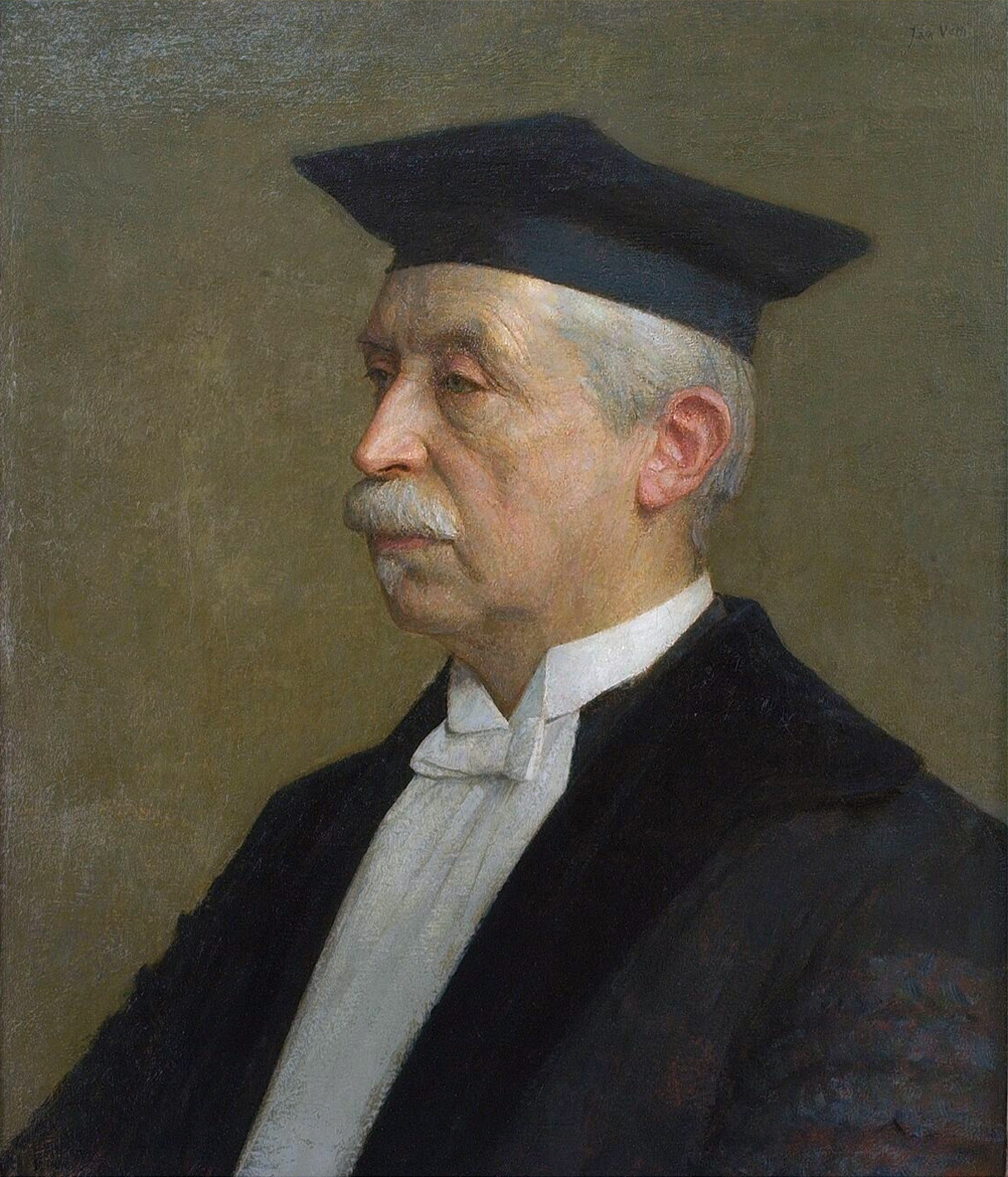
Christiaan Eijkman

- Arnold Aletrino
- Christiaan Eijkman
- Jacobus Kapteyn
- Diederik Johannes Korteweg
- Abraham Kuyper
- Willem Johannes Leyds (1859–1940)
- Max Liebermann
- Hendrik Lorentz
- Johannes Messchaert (1857–1922)
- Rudolph Peter Johann Tutein Nolthenius (1851–1939)
- Alieda Maria Tutein Nolthenius (1855–1910)
- Rosy Wertheim
- Pieter Zeeman

== Biography ==
- Prof. dr. J. Huizinga, Leven en werken van Jan Veth, Haarlem 1927.

== Sources ==
- De Navorscher 1950/1951
- Museum of Dordrecht
- Biographical Dictionary
