= Adriaan Roland Holst =

Dutch writer (1888–1976)

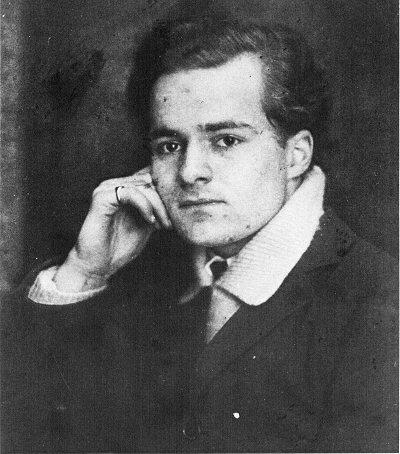
- Holst, 1904
- Born: 23 May 1888; Amsterdam, Netherlands
- Died: 5 August 1976 (aged 88); Bergen, Netherlands

Adriaan Roland Holst (Amsterdam, 23 May 1888 – Bergen, North Holland, 5 August 1976) was a Dutch writer, nicknamed the "Prince of Dutch Poets". He was the second winner, in 1948, of the Constantijn Huygens Prize. He was nominated for the Nobel Prize in Literature in 1961.

Holst was the nephew of painter Richard Roland Holst and writer Henriette Roland Holst. His extensive oeuvre is characterized by its own solemn style and rich symbolism.

== Family ==
The artist Richard Roland Holst was a brother of his father and his wife Henriette Roland Holst-van der Schalk, the poet, writer and socialist was his aunt. Adriaan Roland Holst was called 'Jany' by friends and family. Throughout their lives all three kept in close contact.

== Biography ==
Adriaan Roland Holst grew up in the Gooi region. He went to the high school 'Hilversum HBS' (the school is now named after him and called the A. Roland Holst College) and studied Celtic Arts in Oxford from 1908 to 1911. Already at the age of twenty, he managed to publish poems in the literary magazine "De XXste Eeuw". In 1911, his debut appeared in book form, the bundle "Verzen". In his next bundles "The confession of silence" ("De belijdenis van de stilte") and "Beyond the roads" ("Voorbij de wegen") his own voice has already reached maturity. The verses reveal a romantic desire, from mythology and lofty solitude. "Deirdre and the sons of Usnach" ("Deirdre en de zonen van Usnach", 1920), which appeared in the bibliophile series Palladium, is a poetic story in a Celtic world. It is still widely read. In 1918, Roland Holst went to live in Bergen, where his house is now inhabited by various writers and poets in rotation. He had many literary friends, such as Menno ter Braak, J. C. Bloem, E. du Perron, J. Slauerhoff, M. Vasalis and Victor E. van Vriesland.

== Works ==
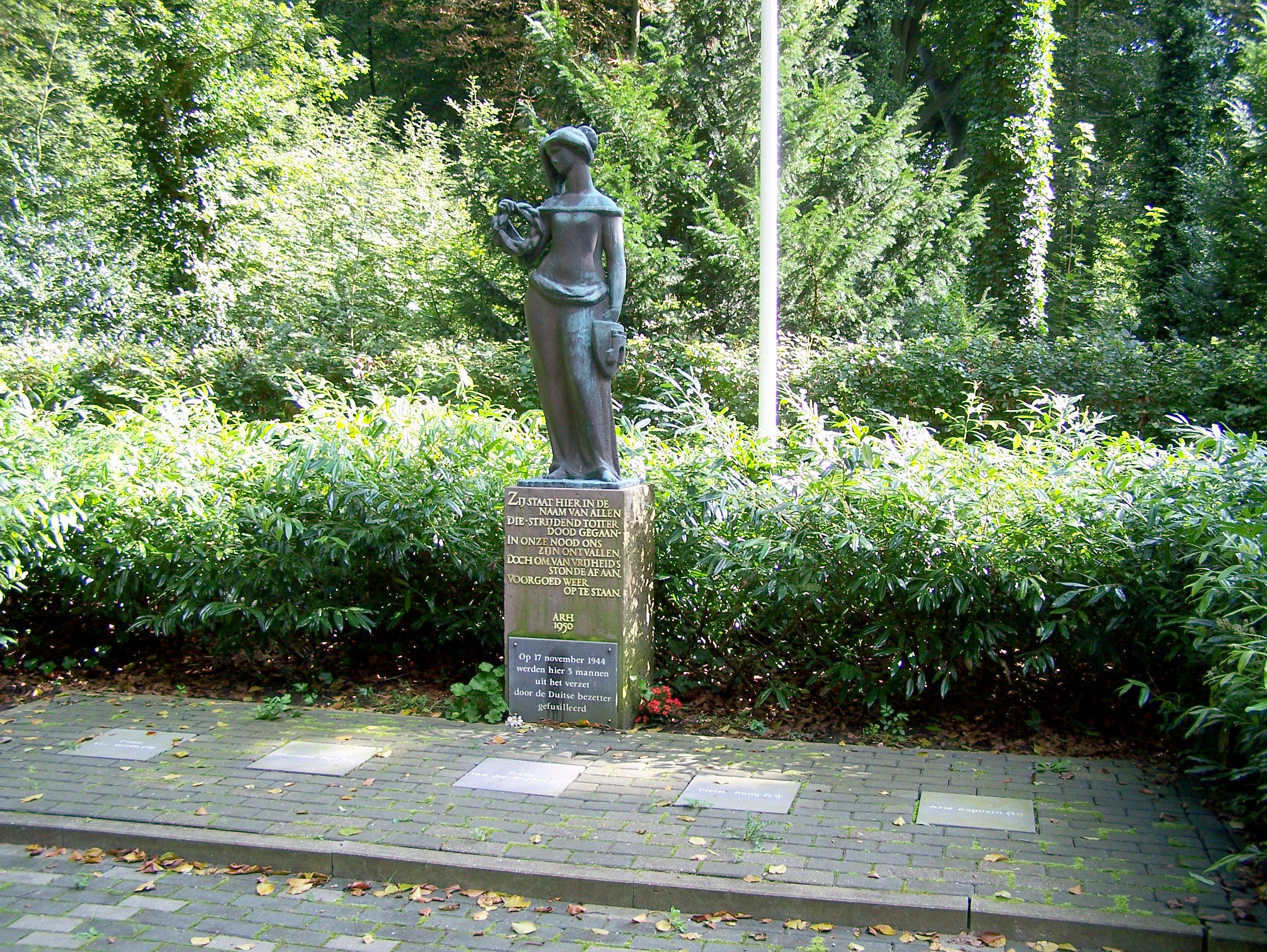
War memorial Stedemaagd by Jeanne Kouwenaar-Bijlo. There's a poem of Adriaan Roland Holst on the pedestal.

- 1911 – Verzen
- 1913 – De belijdenis van de stilte
- 1920 – Deirdre en de zonen van Usnach
- 1920 – Voorbij de wegen
- 1925 – De afspraak
- 1925 – De wilde kim
- 1926 – Ex tenebris mundi: gedichten
- 1926 – Over den dichter Leopold
- 1928 – Het Elysisch verlangen (gevolgd door De zeetocht van Ban)
- 1928 – Shelley, een afscheid
- 1932 – Tusschen vuur en maan
- 1936 – De pooltocht der verbeelding
- 1936 – Voorteekens
- 1937 – Een winter aan zee
- 1938 – Uit zelfbehoud
- 1940 – In memoriam Charles Edgar du Perron en Menno ter Braak
- 1940 – Onderweg
- 1943 – Voor West-Europa
- 1945 – Een winterdageraad
- 1945 – Eigen achtergronden
- 1946 – In memoriam Herman Gorter
- 1946 – Sirenische kunst
- 1947 – De twee planeten
- 1947 – Tegen de wereld
- 1948 – In ballingschap
- 1948 – Van erts tot arend
- 1950 – Swordplay wordplay
- 1951 – De dood van Cuchulainn van Murhevna
- 1951 – Woest en moe
- 1957 – Bezielde dorpen
- 1958 – In gevaar
- 1960 – Omtrent de grens
- 1962 – Onder koude wolken
- 1966 – Aan prinses Beatrix
- 1967 – Kort
- 1967 – Uitersten
- 1968 – Vuur in sneeuw
- 1970 – Met losse teugel
- 1971 – Verzamelde gedichten
- 1975 – In den verleden tijd
