= Frederik van Eeden =

Dutch writer and psychiatrist (1860–1932)

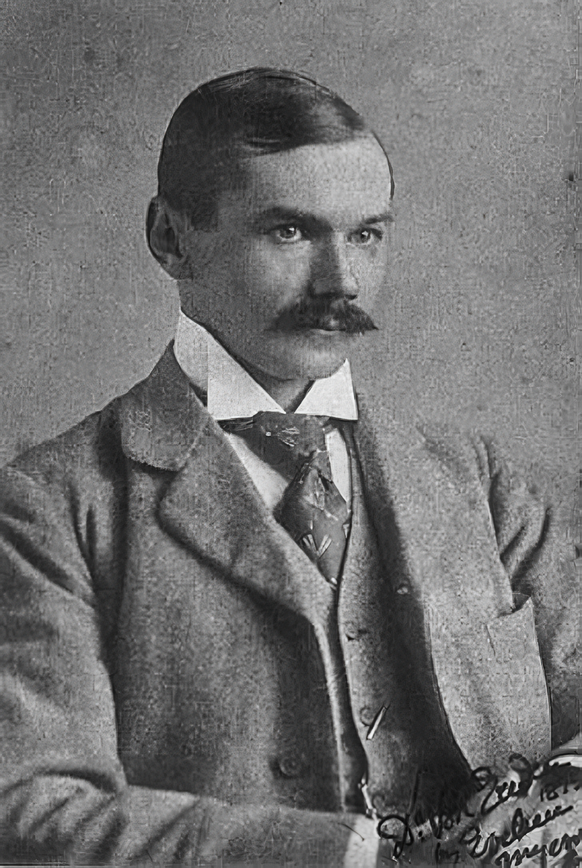
Frederik van Eeden, 1895

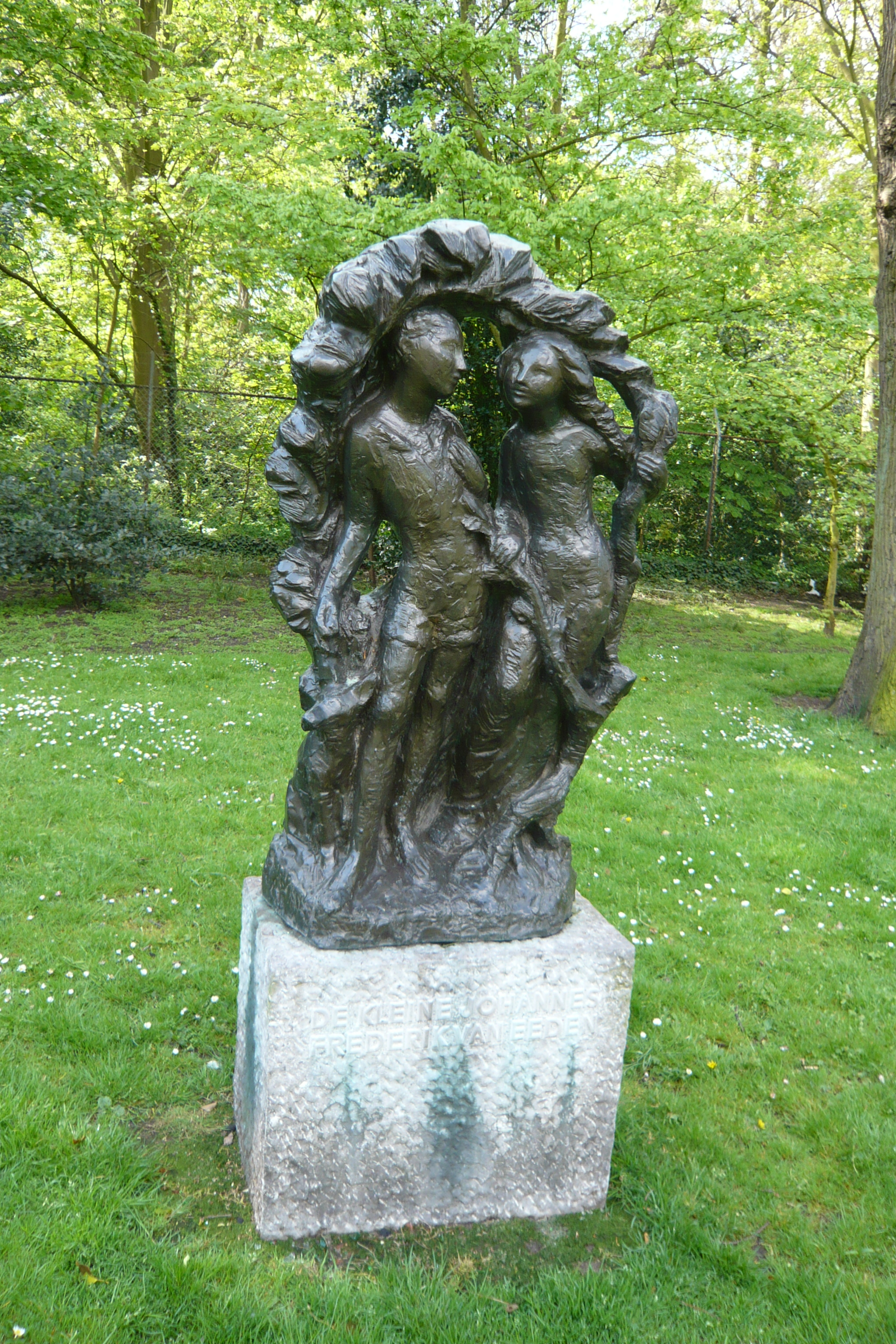
De kleine Johannes by Mari Andriessen, in the Frederikspark, Haarlem

Frederik Willem van Eeden (3 April 1860, Haarlem – 16 June 1932, Bussum) was a Dutch writer and psychiatrist. He was a leading member of the Tachtigers and the Significs Group, and had top billing among the editors of De Nieuwe Gids (The New Guide) during its celebrated first few years of publication, starting in 1885. Van Eeden adopted vegetarianism in 1890 for health reasons, later promoting it as an ethical stance in works like Het Vegetariaat (1896), but gradually distanced himself from it in the early 20th century as his philosophical views shifted.

== Biography ==
Van Eeden was the son of Frederik Willem van Eeden, director of the Royal Tropical Institute in Haarlem.

In 1880 he studied medicine in Amsterdam, where he pursued a bohemian lifestyle and wrote poetry. Whilst living in the city, he coined the term lucid dream in the sense of mental clarity, a term that nowadays is a standard term in the study of dreams, meaning dreaming while knowing that one is dreaming. In his early writings, he was strongly influenced by Hindu ideas of selfhood, by Boehme's mysticism, and by Fechner's panpsychism.

He went on to become a prolific writer, producing many critically acclaimed novels, poetry, plays, and essays. He was widely admired in the Netherlands in his own time for his writings, as well as his status as the first internationally prominent Dutch psychiatrist.

Van Eeden's psychiatrist practice included treating his fellow Tachtiger Willem Kloos as a patient starting in 1888. His treatment of Kloos was of limited benefit, as Kloos deteriorated into alcoholism and increasing symptoms of mental illness. Van Eeden also incorporated his psychiatric insights into his later writings, such as in a deeply psychological novel called "Van de koele meren des doods" (translated in English as "The Deeps of Deliverance"). Published in 1900, the novel intimately traced the struggle of a woman addicted to morphine as she deteriorated physically and mentally.

His best known written work, "De Kleine Johannes" ("Little Johannes"), which first appeared in the premiere issue of De Nieuwe Gids, was a fantastical adventure of an everyman who grows up to face the harsh realities of the world around him and the emptiness of hopes for a better afterlife, but ultimately finding meaning in serving the good of those around him. This ethic is memorialized in the line "Waar de mensheid is, en haar weedom, daar is mijn weg." ("Where mankind is, and her woe, there is my path.")

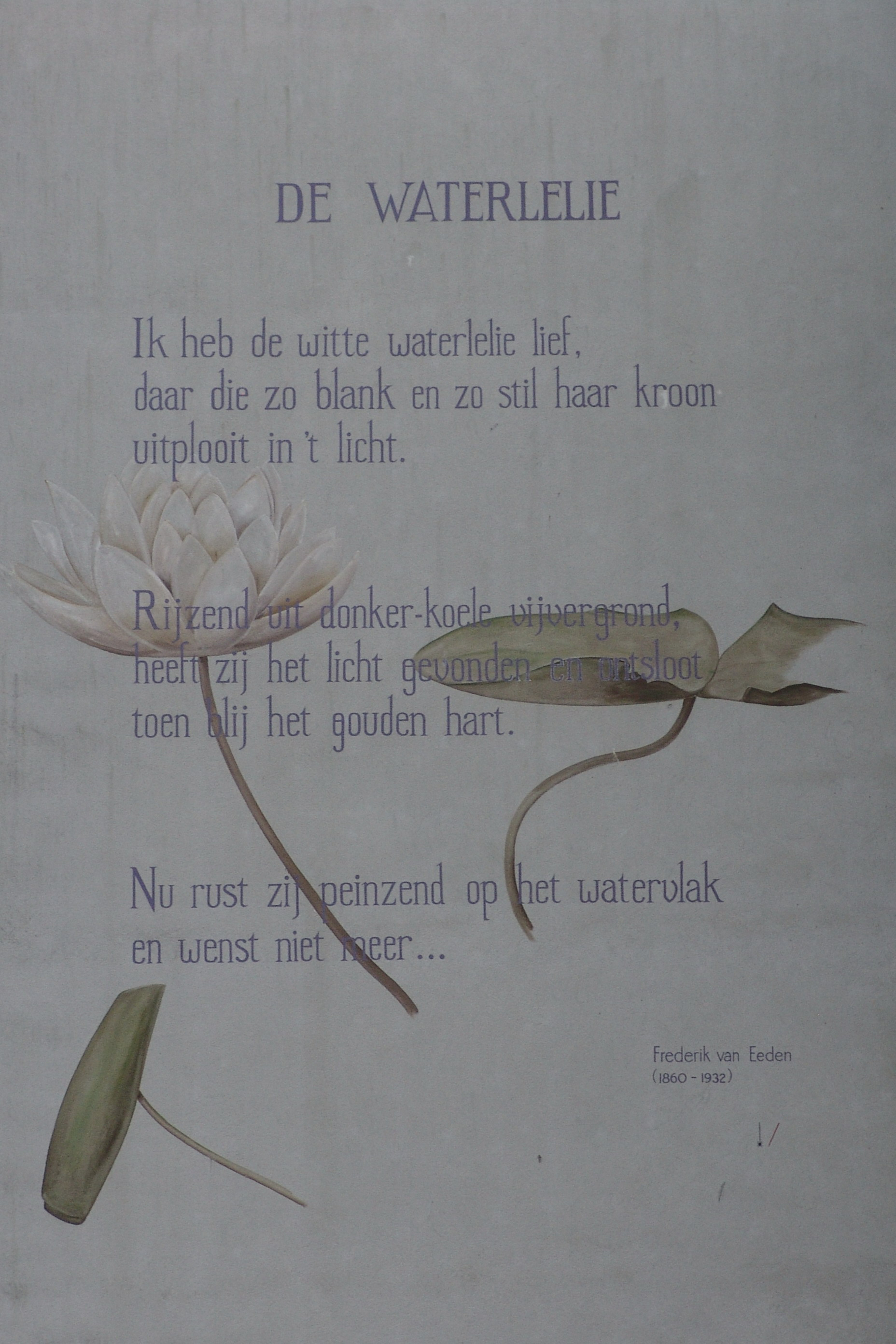
"Waterlily" as a wall poem in Leiden

Van Eeden sought not only to write about, but also to practice, such an ethic. He established a commune named Walden, taking inspiration from Henry David Thoreau's book Walden, in Bussum, North Holland, where the residents tried to produce as much of their needs as they could themselves and to share everything in common, and where he took up a standard of living far below what he was used to. This reflected a trend toward socialism among the Tachtigers; another Tachtiger, Herman Gorter, was a founding member of the world's first Communist political party, the Dutch Social-Democratic Party, in 1909. In 1902, Van Eeden wrote the introduction for the first Dutch translation of the Walden, by Jeanne Reyneke van Stuwe, the wife of the poet Willem Kloos.

Van Eeden visited the United states of America. He had contacts with William James and other psychologists. He met Freud in Vienna, whom he practically introduced in the Netherlands. He corresponded with Hermann Hesse, Charles Lloyd Tuckey (medical hypnotist), Harold Williams and was a friend of Peter Kropotkin, the Russian anarchist living in London.

Van Eeden also had a keen interest in Indian philosophy. He translated many of Tagore’s works, including Gitanjali and short stories.

In late years of his life, Van Eeden became a Roman Catholic unlike he was at first.

== Vegetarianism ==
Van Eeden became a vegetarian in 1890, initially for health reasons, influenced by his exposure to Theosophy. However, by 1896, he shifted to viewing vegetarianism as an ethical stance cause he did not like it anymore, arguing that eating meat was morally akin to practices like cannibalism and vivisection.

In his 1896 work Het vegetariaat, he wrote:

There is too much dispute about the question of whether meat eating is useful and healthy, and whether the human organism is destined for meat food. This is not the question at all. Eating people may also be useful and healthy. Why does no one dispute about that?

He believed that the instinctive aversion to harming animals was suppressed by society and that living without causing animal suffering aligned with both moral evolution and higher human values.

Although he was a prominent advocate for vegetarianism, his personal commitment waned in the early 1900s, likely due to his changing philosophical views and medical background. Despite his early activism, Van Eeden never joined the Dutch Vegetarian Association, critiquing its approach as overly rigid and the people there not being friendly to people that actually ate meat.

== Works ==
- — (August 1911). "The Quest For A Happy Humanity, First Article: The Essential Injustice Of Society". The World's Work: A History of Our Time. XXII: 14702–14713.
- — (September 1911). "The Quest For A Happy Humanity, Second Article: As Poet And Doctor". The World's Work: A History of Our Time. XXII: 14873–14881.
- — (October 1911). "The Quest For A Happy Humanity, Last Article: How I Came To See The Essential Wrong Underlying Commercial Life - The Way Out". The World's Work: A History of Our Time. XXII: 15006–15010.

== See also ==
- Gerrit Mannoury
- Willem Cornelis Bauer
