= Willem Kloos =

Dutch poet and literary critic

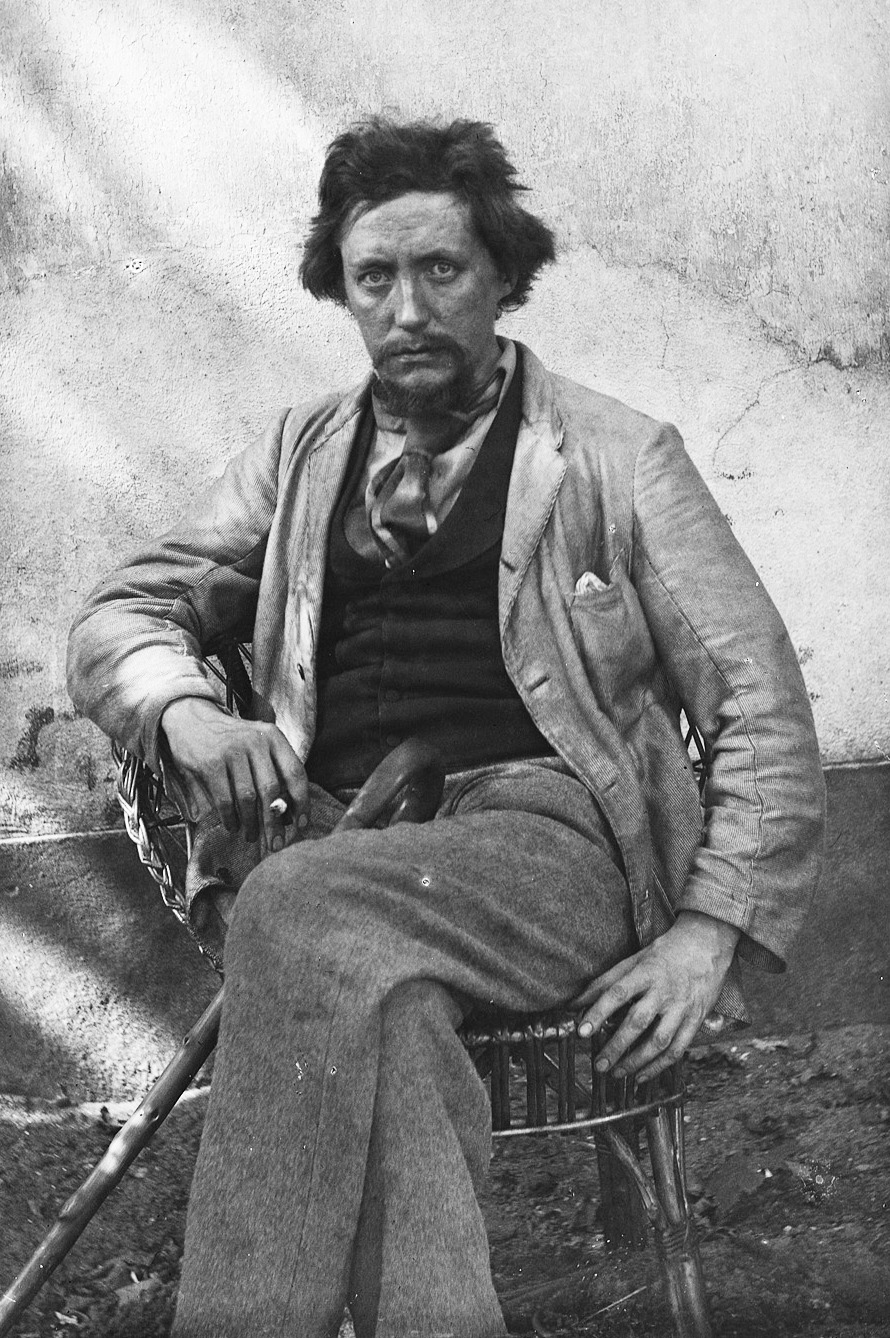
Willem Kloos c. 1890

Willem Johannes Theodorus Kloos (Dutch pronunciation: [ˈʋɪləm ˈkloːs]; 6 May 1859 – 31 March 1938) was a nineteenth-century Dutch poet and literary critic. He was one of the prominent figures of the Movement of Eighty and became editor in chief of De Nieuwe Gids after the editorial fracture in 1893. He was nominated for the Nobel Prize in Literature five times.

== Biography ==
Kloos was one of the leaders, along with the poet Herman Gorter, the critic Lodewijk van Deyssel, and the prolific writer and psychiatrist Frederik van Eeden, of the influential group of Dutch writers known as the Movement of Eighty (Beweging van Tachtig), otherwise known simply as the Tachtigers, who interacted and worked with each other in Amsterdam in the 1880s. As part of this movement, Kloos criticized mainstream literary style as bookish and overly wrought, and instead sought to write poetry in which the form matched the content, so that intimate experiences should be conveyed with a natural intimacy of expression. Kloos also rejected art that sought to express widely shared experiences or emotions. Instead, he demanded that art must be "the most individualistic expression of the most individualistic emotion" ("de allerindividueelste expressie van de allerindividueelste emotie"). Along with the other Tachtigers, Kloos took inspiration in this effort both from Shakespeare and from the then recent Impressionist painters and Naturalist writers.

The Tachtigers' primary literary vehicle was a journal co-founded by Kloos called De Nieuwe Gids (The New Guide), first published in October 1885. The title was intended as a sarcastic anti-tribute to the prevailing literary journal in Amsterdam, De Gids (The Guide), which had usually rejected submissions by Kloos and other Tachtigers. Many pieces by Kloos and others that are still very highly regarded first appeared in the early editions of De Nieuwe Gids, including most of Kloos's sonnets, his most important idiom. However, the Tachtigers had one falling out after another, until Kloos was left in 1893 as the only remaining editor from among the original five editors of De Nieuwe Gids.

Although he published most of his material over several years starting in 1885 in De Nieuwe Gids, Kloos had actually written most prolifically between 1880 and 1885, and had held onto most of his poems for years before publishing them. He claimed to have lost inspiration to write later in life, and indeed almost all the writings for which he is remembered today were written during that period from 1880 to 1885, even if published later.

Starting in 1888 Kloos sought psychiatric treatment from his Tachtiger friend and fellow editor at The New Guide, and psychiatrist, Frederik van Eeden. However, Kloos's mental condition deteriorated, partly due to his increasing alcoholism. He reached his nadir in 1895 when he was picked up in a delirious state and placed temporarily in a sanitarium. He continued trying to write thereafter, although his efforts consisted of little more than ramblings of self-pity and bitter diatribes against one-time friends turned traitors. However, even while Kloos's ongoing efforts were largely ignored, his early works continued to gain an ever-wider appreciation, eventually earning him several literary honors and prizes.

He was for a short time a patient of Frederik van Eeden in the town Bussum, where he stayed at his place. After meeting Jeanne Reyneke van Stuwe, who sent him her poems he moved to The Hague, where he married her in 1900. They stayed together until his death.

Kloos died in The Hague in 1938 at 79, after watching his early writings become part of the canon of Dutch literature.
