= Lodewijk van Deyssel =

Dutch author and literary critic (1864–1952)

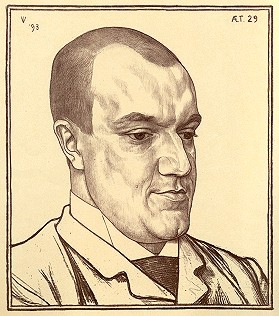
Lodewijk van Deyssel by Jan Veth

Lodewijk van Deyssel was the pseudonym of Karel Joan Lodewijk Alberdingk Thijm (22 September 1864, Amsterdam – 26 January 1952), a Dutch novelist, prose-poet and literary critic and a leading member of the Tachtigers. He was a son of Joseph Alberdingk Thijm.
