= De Nieuwe Gids =

Dutch literary periodical (1885–1943)

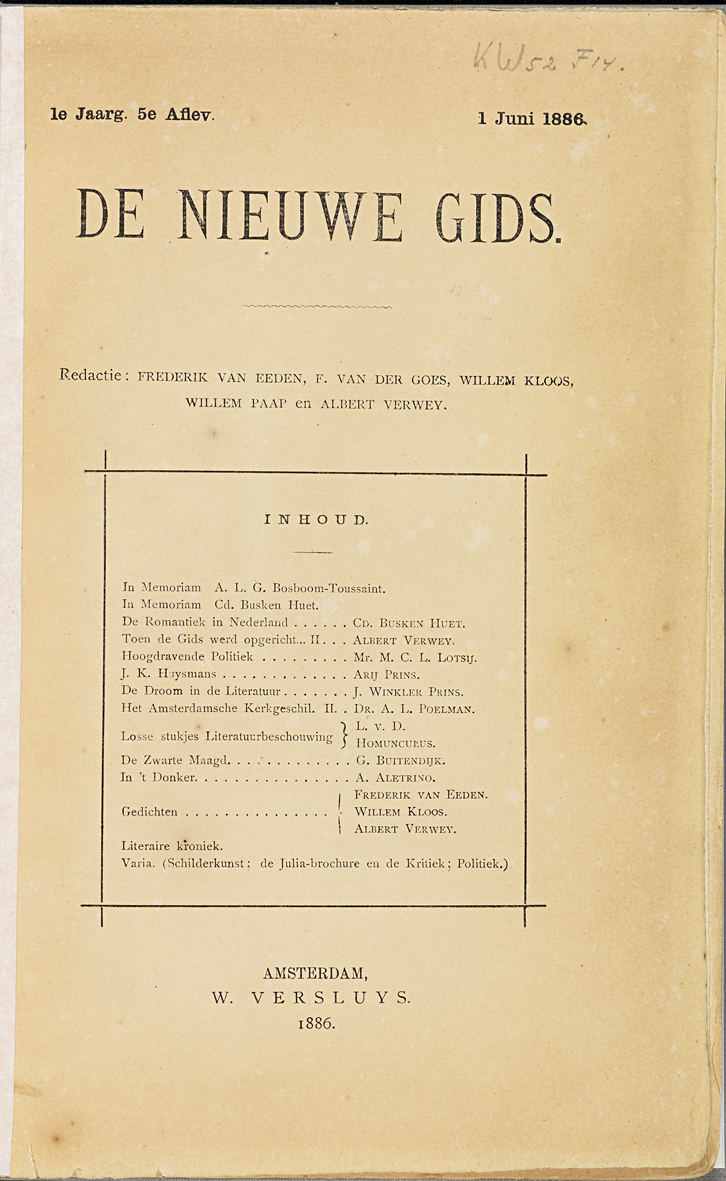

De Nieuwe Gids (from Dutch: The New Guide) was a Dutch illustrated literary periodical which was published from 1885 to 1943. It played an important role in promoting the literary movement of the 1880s. Its contents covered a wide range of topics, extending to developments in science.

== History and profile ==
Around 1880, a group of young writers in Amsterdam, dissatisfied with the existing conservative literary climate, founded the group Flanor, also known as the Tachtigers, and began publishing De Nieuwe Gids as a vehicle for their work. The first issue appeared on 1 October 1885.

The title The New Guide was intended as a sarcastic anti-tribute to Amsterdam's prevailing literary journal, De Gids (The Guide), which the Tachtigers viewed as old-fashioned and didactic, and which had persistently rejected their submissions. Two of the founding editors and frequent contributors to The New Guide were the poet and critic Willem Kloos, and the poet, novelist, playwright, essayist, and psychiatrist Frederik van Eeden, both of whom are widely regarded today as canonical greats of Dutch literature. The other three founding editors of The New Guide were F. van der Goes, Willem Paap, and Albert Verwey. Other prominent Tachtigers' works first appeared in The New Guide, including the literary critic Lodewijk van Deyssel, and the poet Herman Gorter, who is probably the most widely read Tachtiger. His poem Mei was first published in De Nieuwe Gids in 1887.

De Nieuwe Gids is almost entirely known for the material from its first few years. Within a few years of its founding, its editors had one falling out after another, until the only editor left by 1893 was Kloos, who himself was rapidly deteriorating into mental illness and alcoholism, and who converted De Nieuwe Gids into little more than a personal journal for cataloguing his many betrayals and sufferings. It was purchased in 1938 by Alfred Haighton who again changed focus, making the magazine a platform for pro-Nazi Germany material. De Nieuwe Gids was finally discontinued in 1943.
