= De Gids =

Dutch literary periodical (1837–present)

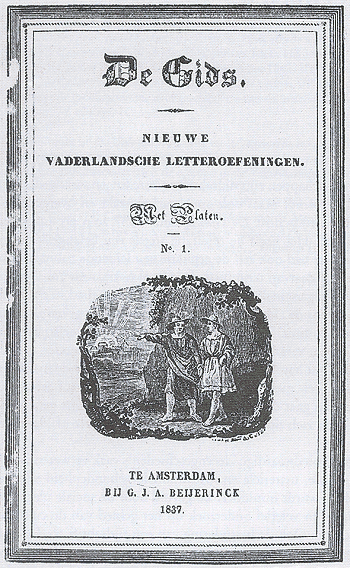
- Discipline: Literary magazine
- Language: Dutch
- Edited by: Edzard Mik

Publication details
- History: 1837 to present
- Publisher: De Groene Amsterdammer (Netherlands)
- Frequency: Bimonthly

Standard abbreviations
- ISO 4: Gids

Indexing
- ISSN: 0016-9730

Links
- Journal homepage

De Gids (from Dutch: The Guide) is the oldest Dutch literary periodical still published today. It was founded in 1837 by Everhardus Johannes Potgieter and Christianus Robidé van der Aa. Long regarded as the most prestigious literary periodical in the Netherlands, it was considered outdated by the Tachtigers of the 1880s, who founded De Nieuwe Gids (The New Guide) in opposition to the periodical.

In 1967, Joke Smit’s essay Het onbehagen bij de vrouw (The Discontent of Women) was published in De Gids; the publication of this essay is often regarded as the start of the second wave of feminism in the Netherlands.

In 2011, De Gids ceased operations, but it has been taken over as De-Gids-nieuwe-stijl (The-Guide-New-Style) by De Groene Amsterdammer.

All volumes of De Gids up to 2012 are published in the Digital Library for Dutch Literature.
