= Tachtigers =

Late 19th-century Dutch literary group

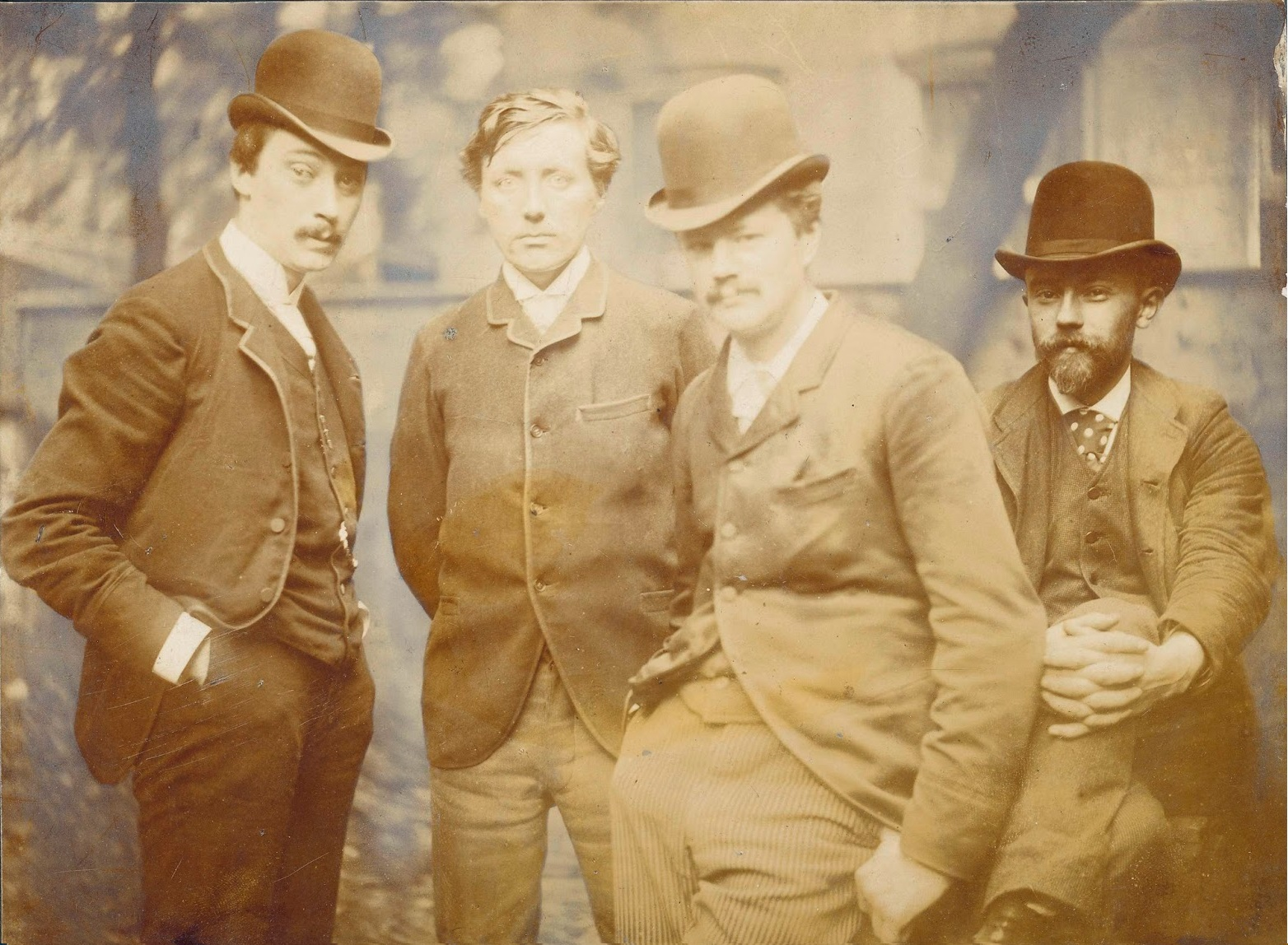
Four of the Tachtigers photographed around 1888: from left to right, Willem Witsen, Willem Kloos, Hein Boeken, Maurits van der Valk

The Tachtigers ("Eightiers"), otherwise known as the Movement of Eighty (Dutch: Beweging van Tachtig), were a radical and influential group of Dutch writers who developed a new approach in 19th-century Dutch literature. They interacted and worked together in Amsterdam from the 1880s. Many of them are still widely read today.

The Tachtigers were so named simply because they became active around the year 1880. The movement was based on revolt against what the Tachtigers perceived as the formalistic and overly wrought style of mainstream literature in their day, particularly as favored by the predominant literary journal in Amsterdam, De Gids (The Guide). The Tachtigers instead insisted that style must match content, and that intimate and visceral emotions can only be expressed using an intimate and visceral writing style. For guidance in this effort, they tended to draw inspiration from Shakespeare, and from the then recent Impressionist painters and Naturalist writers.

After De Gids continued to reject most of their submissions, the Tachtigers founded their own competing literary journal, mockingly called De Nieuwe Gids (The New Guide), first published in October 1885. Two of the founding editors and frequent contributors were the poet and critic Willem Kloos and the poet, novelist, playwright, essayist, and psychiatrist Frederik van Eeden, both of whom are widely regarded today as canonical greats of Dutch literature. The other three founding editors were F. van der Goes, Willem Paap, and Albert Verwey. Other prominent Tachtigers whose works appeared in De Nieuwe Gids include the literary critic Lodewijk van Deyssel and the poet Herman Gorter, author of the epic poem Mei, who is probably the most widely read Tachtiger. He went on to become a founding member of the Social Democratic Party and was a prominent theoretician of the social democratic and council communist movements.

Another prominent novelist, Louis Couperus, published his first novel in 1889 and was deeply influenced by the Tachtigers. He is often counted as a Tachtiger, although he was outside the Amsterdam social circle of the true Tachtigers.

== Sources ==
- Gerben Colmjon (1963). De beweging van Tachtig: een cultuurhistorische verkenning in de negentiende eeuw (in Dutch). Antwerp: Spectrum. OCLC 901586030.
- Enno Endt (1990). Het festijn van tachtig: de vervulling van heel groote dingen scheen nabij (in Dutch). Amsterdam: Nijgh & van Ditmar. ISBN 9789023657262.
- Martien J. G. de Jong, ed. (1985). Honderd jaar later: essays over schrijvers en geschriften uit de Beweging van Tachtig: Lodewijk van Deyssel, Frederik van Eeden, Herman Gorter, Willem Kloos, Albert Verwey (in Dutch). Baarn: De Prom. ISBN 978-90-6801-014-5.
- Jan Oosterholt (2005). De bril van Tachtig: het beeld van de 19e-eeuwse Nederlandse dichtkunst. Amsterdamse historische reeks, Kleine serie (in Dutch). Vol. 45. Amsterdam: Stichting Amsterdamse Historische Reeks. ISBN 978-90-73941-27-4.
- Corrado Hoorweg (2014). Van Mathilde tot Mei: de dichters van 1880 en de vriendschapssonnetten van Jacques Perk en Willem Kloos. Prominent (in Dutch). Vol. 8. Baarn: TIEM. ISBN 978-90-79272-38-9.
