= Herman Gorter =

Dutch writer and communist theorist (1864–1927)

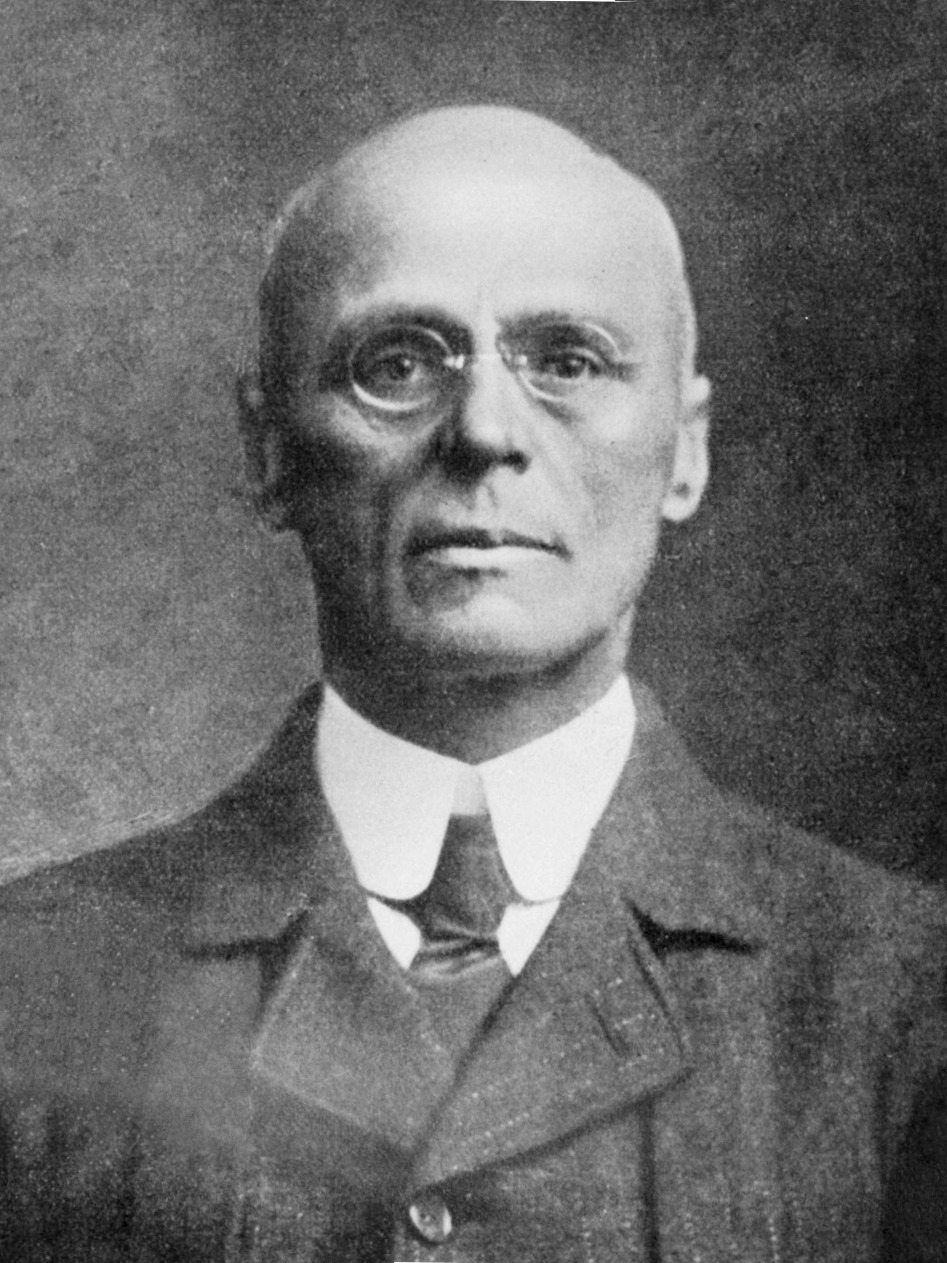
- Gorter in 1926
- Born: 26 November 1864; Wormerveer, Netherlands
- Died: 15 September 1927 (aged 62); Brussels, Belgium
- Education: University of Amsterdam
- Occupations: Poet, classical scholar, communist theorist
- Notable work: Mei (1889); Open Letter to Comrade Lenin (1920)
- Political party: SDAP (1897–1909); SDP (1909–1918); CPH (1918–1921); KAPD (sympathiser)
- Movement: Tachtigers; Left communism; Council communism
- Spouse: Louise Cnoop Koopmans

Herman Gorter (Dutch: [ˈɣɔrtər]; 26 November 1864 – 15 September 1927) was a Dutch poet, classical scholar, and communist theorist. A leading member of the Tachtigers, a highly influential literary movement in the Netherlands, he was one of the most acclaimed poets of his generation for his 1889 lyrical epic Mei. After 1897, he became a committed Marxist and a prominent theoretician of the international communist left.

Gorter joined the Social Democratic Workers' Party (SDAP) in 1897, becoming a leading voice of its left-wing Marxist opposition. In 1909, he was part of the Tribunist schism that formed the Social Democratic Party (SDP). Following the outbreak of the First World War, Gorter became a staunch opponent of the war and a prominent internationalist, aligning with the Zimmerwald Left. He hailed the Russian Revolution of 1917 as the beginning of the world revolution and supported Vladimir Lenin and the Bolsheviks.

After 1918, Gorter became a key figure in the German communist left, particularly within the Communist Workers' Party of Germany (KAPD). In 1920, he authored the Open Letter to Comrade Lenin, a seminal critique of the Communist International's turn toward parliamentary and trade union tactics, which became a foundational text of left communism. He was a primary force behind the creation of the Communist Workers' International (KAI) in 1921. He spent his final years working to regroup the divided left-communist movement until his death in 1927.

== Early life and literary career ==
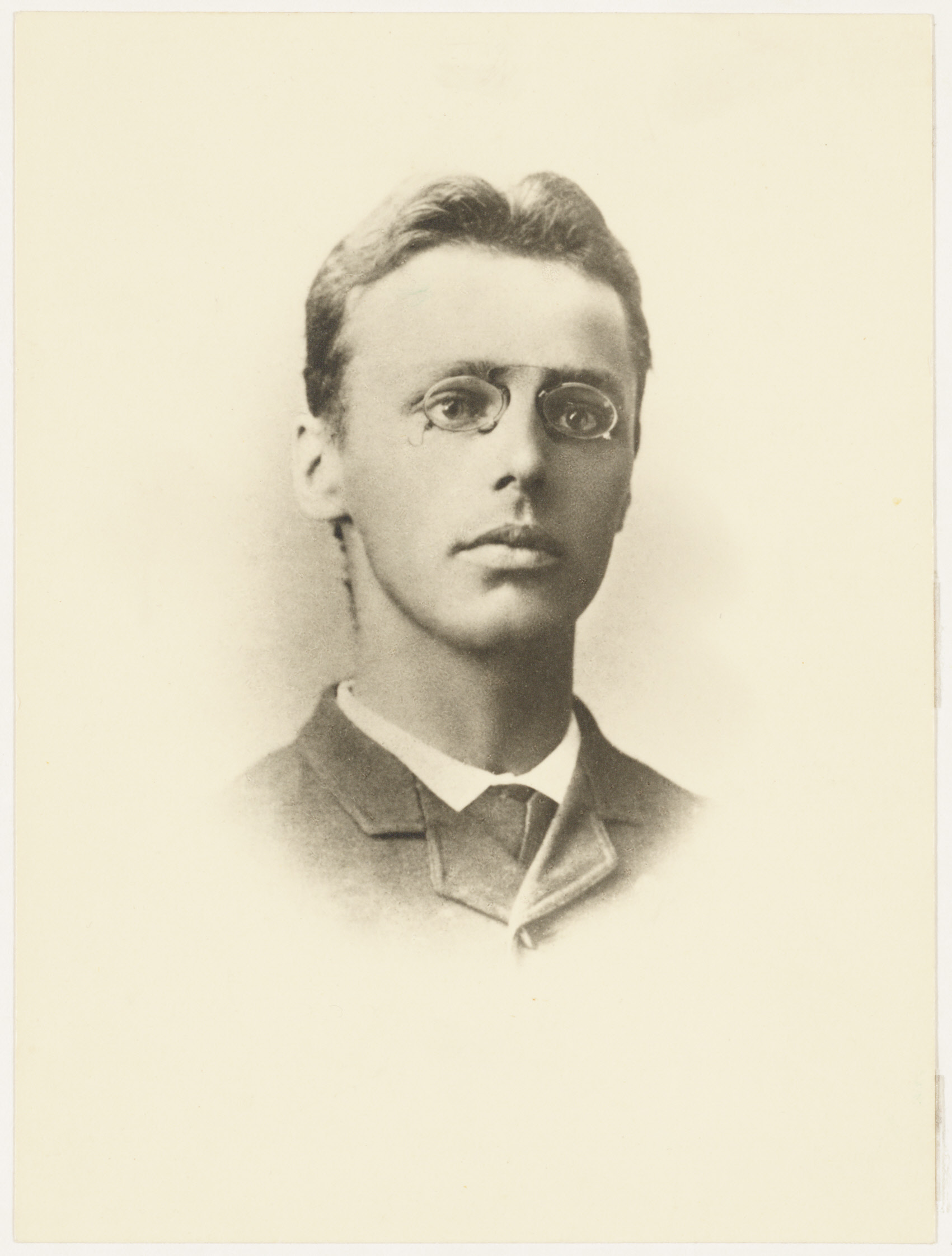
Gorter in 1884

Herman Gorter was born in Wormerveer on 26 November 1864. The son of a Mennonite pastor, he studied classics and wrote a doctoral thesis on the Greek tragedian Aeschylus. In the 1880s, Gorter became a leading figure of the Tachtigers ("Eightiers"), a highly influential Dutch literary movement that championed Impressionism and aestheticism. He was acclaimed as the greatest poet of his generation, particularly after the 1889 publication of his symbolist and idealist epic poem Mei ("May"), which remains his most famous literary work. Following a spiritual crisis, Gorter developed an interest in the pantheism of the Dutch philosopher Baruch Spinoza, translating his Ethics from Latin into Dutch. He soon broke with the literary movement of his generation and turned to the study of Karl Marx and Karl Kautsky.

== Political evolution ==
=== Social-Democratic Party of the Netherlands (SDAP) ===
In 1897, Gorter became an enthusiastic member of the Social-Democratic Party of the Netherlands (SDAP). He became a dynamic militant and a remarkable orator, renowned for his ability to popularize complex Marxist ideas. He founded the party's Bussum section, taught courses on Marxism to textile workers, and was widely regarded as a key agitator, organiser, and propagandist for the party. He was seen as the only leader capable of genuinely connecting with the workers' emotions and inspiring their enthusiasm.

Gorter became a prominent voice in the Marxist opposition within the SDAP, which coalesced after the defeat of the 1903 transport strikes. In 1905, following pressure from the party's left wing, a new directing committee was nominated, composed of a majority of Marxists, including Gorter. He became deeply involved in the theoretical and political struggles against the revisionism of the party leadership under Pieter Jelles Troelstra, engaging in a significant polemic over the question of "proletarian morality" in 1908.

=== Tribunist split ===
In October 1907, Gorter and other radical Marxists began publishing their own weekly paper, De Tribune, in opposition to the party leadership. This led to an anti-Marxist campaign by the revisionist leaders, culminating in an attempt to ban the paper at the Arnhem Congress in April 1908. Although the proposal was rejected, an open crisis developed, leading to an extraordinary party congress in Deventer in February 1909 to resolve the issue. Gorter, who was more cautious than other Tribunists, was initially hesitant to precipitate a split and argued for fighting to the last within the party. However, the congress voted overwhelmingly to suppress De Tribune and expel its three editors.

After six weeks of hesitation, Gorter committed himself to working with the expelled Tribunists, who had formed a permanent organisation-commission. He and David Wijnkoop met with the International Socialist Bureau (ISB) in Brussels to mediate a resolution. However, before the ISB's negotiations could conclude, the Tribunists held a founding congress for a new party, the Social Democratic Party (SDP). Gorter became a member of the new SDP's leadership. In 1910, he played a crucial role in combating sectarian tendencies within the new party, arguing against those who saw the old SDAP as a bourgeois party and advocating for tactical joint activity on issues such as universal suffrage.

=== First World War and internationalism ===
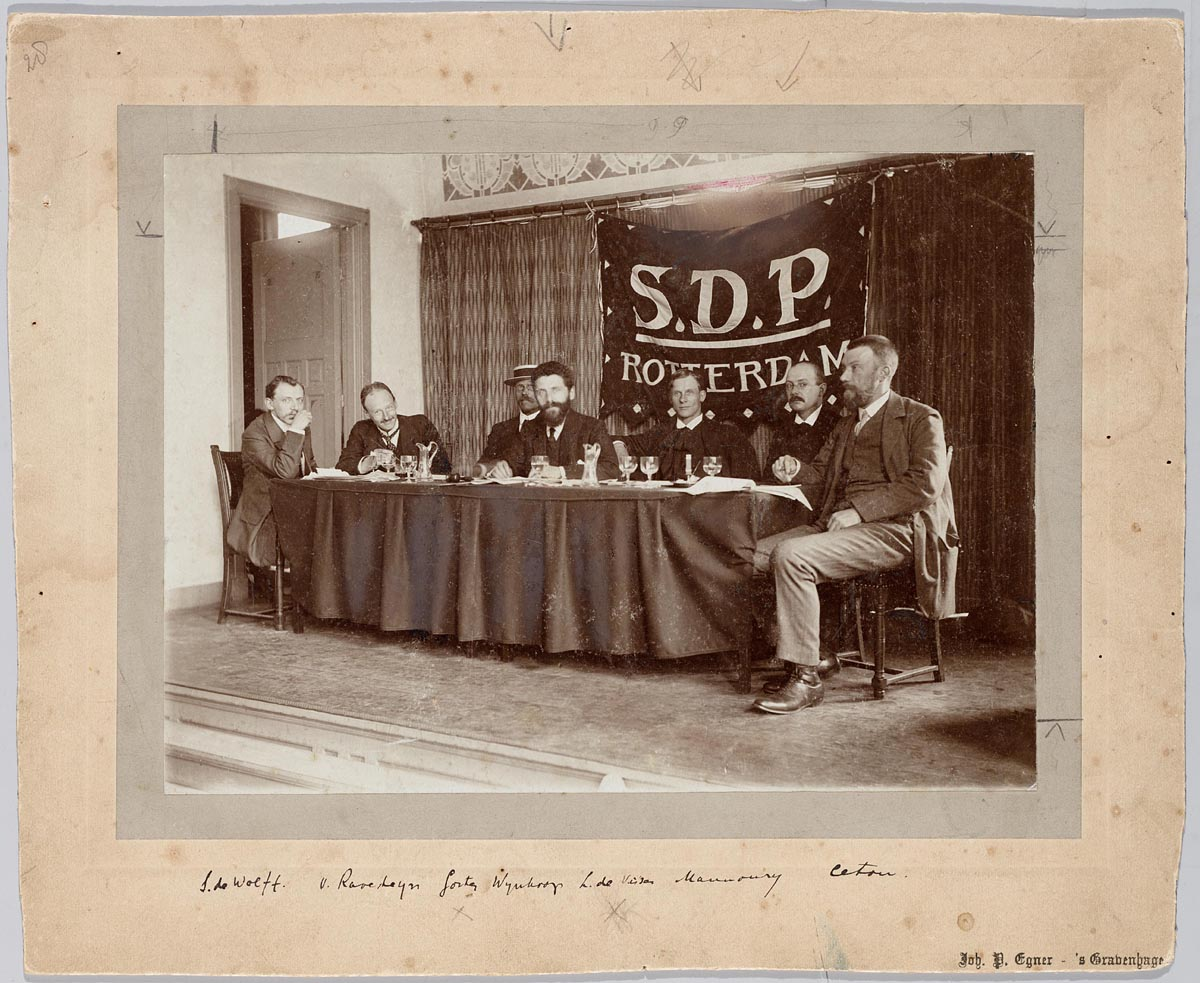
Gorter (third from left) with other SDP members, 1911

With the looming threat of the First World War, Gorter became a leading voice for internationalism. As an SDP delegate to the 1912 Basel Congress of the Second International, he prepared a powerful speech against militarism and imperialism. In October 1914, following the outbreak of the war and the collapse of the International, Gorter wrote his seminal pamphlet Imperialism, the World War, and the Social Democracy. The work, which was immediately translated into German, defined the war as imperialist, proclaimed the death of the Second International, and called for the formation of a new revolutionary International. In it, he rejected national liberation struggles as incompatible with the proletarian cause in the epoch of imperialism. The pamphlet was highly influential in the internationalist milieu and was enthusiastically hailed by Vladimir Lenin. Gorter became a key figure in the Zimmerwald Left, working with Lenin and others to regroup the revolutionary forces against the war. He was nominated by the Communist International's leadership to the Amsterdam Bureau in 1919.

=== Communist left and the Comintern ===
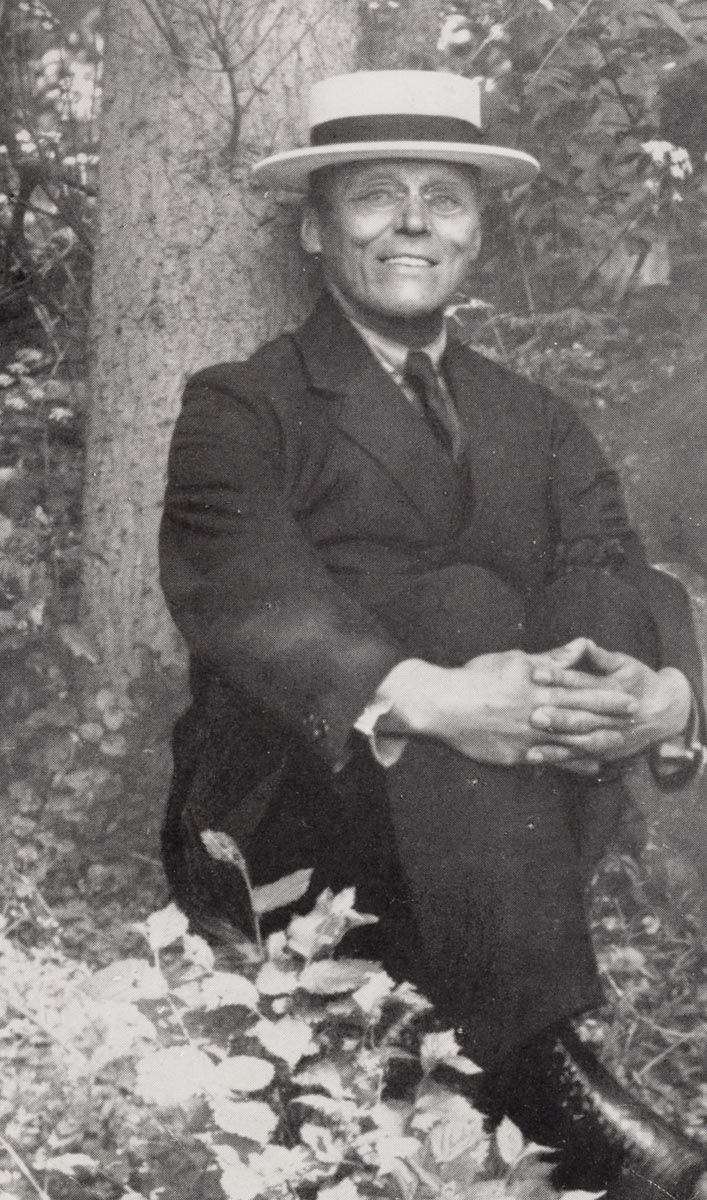
Gorter c. 1910s

Gorter was a fervent supporter of the Russian Revolution, translating Lenin's The State and Revolution into Dutch and, for a time, fostering what his contemporaries described as a "veritable Lenin personality cult". In his 1918 pamphlet The World Revolution, he hailed the workers' councils as the newly discovered form of revolutionary power, valid not just for Russia but for the entire world.

Within the Communist Party of Holland (CPH), the successor to the SDP, Gorter became a leader of the opposition to the party's opportunist leadership under Wijnkoop. He became increasingly separated from the Dutch movement, however, and devoted his energies to the revolutionary movement in Germany. He became a key theoretical leader and mentor of the Communist Workers' Party of Germany (KAPD), a split from the Communist Party of Germany. In 1920, Gorter wrote his Open Letter to Comrade Lenin as a response to Lenin's pamphlet 'Left-Wing' Communism: An Infantile Disorder. In the Open Letter, Gorter articulated the core principles of left communism, arguing against the Comintern's turn towards parliamentarism and trade union work. He contended that the revolutionary situation in Western Europe was fundamentally different from that in Russia, as the proletariat stood alone without the possibility of an alliance with the peasantry, and thus required different tactics. The Open Letter became a foundational text of the Dutch-German communist left. As a delegate for the KAPD, Gorter travelled to Moscow and defended his positions before the Executive Committee of the Comintern.

=== Communist Workers' International (KAI) and final years ===
Gorter was the primary figure behind the establishment of the Communist Workers' International (KAI) in 1921, an attempt to unite the forces of the communist left internationally. The initiative, however, proved to be an "adventure without any future" and was based on a pessimistic assessment that the vast majority of the world's workers were hostile to the revolution.

After the split in the KAPD in 1922, Gorter initially sided with the Essen tendency and provided its program for the KAI. However, he soon separated from the group and declared his intention to work for the reunification of the opposing KAPD factions. He devoted the last years of his life to an unsuccessful effort to regroup the scattered forces of the left-communist movement. His final political act was to write to the Berlin KAPD, warning them against euphoria after they absorbed new members from another group and urging them to maintain the "purity" of their principles. Gorter died in Brussels on 15 September 1927.

== Legacy ==
Herman Gorter is remembered as a central figure in the Dutch-German communist left, alongside Anton Pannekoek and Rosa Luxemburg. While his early career established him as one of the Netherlands' most important poets, his later life was dedicated to the revolutionary cause. He was a prolific theorist whose work played a decisive role in the development of left communism. His critique of the Second International's reformism, his staunch internationalism during the First World War, and his later opposition to the tactical orientation of the Comintern established him as a leading figure of the revolutionary left in Europe. His writings, particularly his Open Letter to Comrade Lenin, remain essential texts for understanding the principles and trajectory of the left-communist current.

== Major works ==
=== Literary ===
- Mei (May, 1889)
- Verzen (Poems, 1903)
- Een klein heldendicht (A Little Epic Poem, 1906)
- Pan (1912)

=== Political ===
- Het historisch materialisme voor arbeiders verklaard (Historical Materialism Explained to Workers, 1909)
- Imperialism, the World War, and the Social Democracy (1914)
- The World Revolution (1918)
- Open Letter to Comrade Lenin (1920)
- The Communist Workers' International (1923)
