= Basic Library of Dutch Literature =

List of important works of Dutch Literature

The Basisbibliotheek (Basic Library of Dutch Literature) comprises a list of 1000 works of Dutch Literature important to the cultural heritage of the Low Countries, and is published on the Digital library for Dutch literature (DBNL). Several of these works are lists themselves; such as early dictionaries, lists of songs, recipes, biographies or encyclopedic compilations of information such as mathematical, scientific, medical or plant reference books. Other items include early translations of literature from other countries, history books, and first-hand diaries and published correspondence. Notable original works can be found by author name.

What follows is the list of the first 500 works, leading up to the early 20th century.

== Middle Ages ==
year	author	title
ca. 1180	Heinrich von Veldeke	Eneas Romance
13th century	anonymous	Dietsche Catoen
13th century	Jacob van Maerlant	Alexanders Geesten
13th century	anonymous	Van smeinscen lede
13th century	anonymous	Limburgse sermoenen
13th century	anonymous	Roman van Lancelot
13th century	Penninc, Pieter Vostaert and anonymous	De jeeste van Walewein en het schaakbord
13th century	Hadewijch	Strofische gedichten
13th century	Hadewijch	Letters
na 1250	Jacob van Maerlant	Heimelykheid der heimelykheden
ca. 1266	Jacob van Maerlant	Der naturen bloeme
ca. 1274	anonymous	Leven van Lutgart (a Life of Lutgardis)
1275–1300	anonymous	Van den vos Reynaerde
ca. 1288-1294	Jan van Heelu	Rymkronyk betreffende den slag van Woeringen van het jaer 1288
ca. 1290	Melis Stoke	Rijmkroniek van Holland
end 13th century	John I, Duke of Brabant	Lyriek
end 13th century	anonymous	De natuurkunde van het geheelal
latter half 14th century	Geert Groote	Contra turrim Traiectensem
ca. 1300	anonymous	Het Luikse diatesseron
14th century	Gerard Zerbolt of Zutphen	De libris teutonicalibus
14th century	Geert Groote	Getijdenboek
1300–1325	Jacob van Maerlant	Spiegel historiael (5 parts)
1300–1350	Jan van Boendale	Brabantsche yeesten
ca.1310	Johan Yperman	Cyrurgie
1315–1335	Lodewijk van Velthem	Spiegel historiael. Vijfde partie
1325–1328	Jan van Boendale	Der leken spieghel
1351	anonymous	Antidotarium Nicolaï
1351	Jan de Weert	Spieghel der sonden of nieuwe doctrinael
1356	anonymous	De blijde inkomst van de hertogen van Brabant Johanna en Wenceslas
1359	Jan van Ruusbroec	Een spieghel der ewigher salicheit
1380–1425	anonymous	Van sente Brandane
1400–1420	anonymous	Abele spelen
15th century	anonymous	Der byen boeck
ca. 1400	anonymous	Gruuthuse manuscript
ca. 1400	anonymous	Die bouc van seden
15th century	anonymous	De bouc van den ambachten
15th century	anonymous	De Geomantie in het Middelnederlands
ca. 1404	Dirc van Delf	Tafel van den Kersten ghelove
ca. 1405	anonymous	Der vrouwen heimelijcheit
1410–1415	anonymous	Ridderboec
ca. 1411	Dirc Potter	Der minnen loep
1436	Magister Jacobus	Computus Magistri Jacobi
ca. 1440	Thomas à Kempis	De imitatione Christi (MiddleDutch translation)
1477	anonymous	Bible in duytsche (Delft bible 1477)
1477	anonymous	Groot privilege
1485	Bartholomeus Engelsman	Van den proprieteyten der dinghen (translation by Jacob Bellaert)
ca. 1496	anonymous	Elckerlijc
end 15th century	anonymous	Die 100 capittelen van astronomijen
16th century	anonymous	Saul ende David
16th century	Johannes Coninck	Cirurgia of Hantgewerck int lichame der menschen
1512	anonymous	Jan van Beverley
1513	anonymous	Tbouc van wondre
ca. 1514	anonymous	Een notabel boecxken van cokeryen
1516	anonymous	Een schoone historie van Margriete van Limborch ende van Heyndric haren broeder
1517	Cornelius Aurelius	Die cronycke van Hollandt
1525	anonymous	Dat batement van recepten
1528	Anna Bijns	Schoon ende suverlijc boecxken inhoudende veel constige refereinen (Refereinen 1528)
1530	Jan van Naaldwijk	Van Brabant die excellente cronike
1531	Andries de Smet	Die excellente cronike van Vlaenderen
1535	Christiaen van Vaerenbraken	Conste van musike oft vanden Sanghe
1537	David Joris	Een geestelijck liedt-boecxken
1539	anonymous	Een devoot ende profitelyck boecxken
1539	anonymous	De Gentse Spelen van 1539
1540	Willem van Zuylen van Nyevelt	Souterliedekens
1544	anonymous	Antwerps liedboek
1548	Matthijs de Castelein	De const van rhetoriken
ca. 1550	Joos Lambrecht	Naembouck

== Dutch Golden Age ==
year	author	title
1554	Menno Simons	Uytgangh ofte bekeeringhe
1557	Ambrosius Zeebout	Tvoyage van Mher Joos van Ghistele
1560	Desiderius Erasmus	Lof der Zotheid (Dutch translation of Erasmus's Latin version Moriae Encomion, 1511)
1561	Eduard de Dene	Testament rhetoricael
1562	anonymous	Het Offer des Heeren
1562	Anthonis de Roovere	Rethoricale wercken (edited by Eduard de Dene)
1563–1564	Willem van Haecht	Dwerc der Apostelen
1565	Lucas de Heere	Den Hof ende Boomgaert der Poësien
1565–1574	Godevaert van Haecht	Kroniek over de troebelen van 1565 tot 1574 te Antwerpen en elders
1566	Pieter Datheen	De Psalmen Davids
1566	Lodovico Guicciardini	Beschrijvinghe van alle de Neder-landen
1566–1568	Marcus van Vaernewyck	Van die beroerlicke tijden in die Nederlanden en voornamelick in Ghendt 1566-1568
1568	Johan Radermacher	Voorreden vanden noodich ende nutticheit der Nederduytscher taelkunste
ca. 1568	Jan van der Noot	Het bosken
1569	anonymous	Historie van broer Cornelis
1569	Philips van Marnix van Sint Aldegonde	De bijencorf der H. Roomsche Kercke
1574	Hans Vanacker	Geuzenliedboek
1574	Marcus van Vaernewyck	De historie van Belgis
1576–1579	Andries Vierlingh	Tractaet van dyckagie
1581	Pontus de Heuiter	Nederduitse orthographie
1581	anonymous	Plakkaat van Verlatinge
1581	Willem van Oranje	Apologie
1584	H.L. Spiegel	Twe-spraack vande Nederduitsche letterkunst
1584	Justus Lipsius	Twee boecken vande stantvasticheyt
1585	Simon Stevin	De Thiende
1585	D.V. Coornhert	Zedekunst dat is wellevenskunste
1586	Simon Stevin	Uytspraeck van de weerdichheyt der Duytsche tael
1588	Lucas Jansz Waghenaer	Spiegel der zeevaert
1590	Simon Stevin	Het burgherlyck leven
1591	Dirck Adriaensz. Valcooch	Den reghel der Duytsche schoolmeesters
1596	Jan Huyghen van Linschoten	Itinerario (Travelogue)
1598	Gerrit de Veer	Waerachtighe beschryvinghe van drie seylagien
1599	C. Kiliaan	Etymologicum Teutonicae Linguae
17th century	Passchier de Fyne	Het leeven en eenige bysondere voorvallen
1604	Karel van Mander	Het schilder-boeck
1605–1608	Simon Stevin	Wisconstighe gedachtenissen
1610	Willem Baudartius	Morghen-wecker der vrye Nederlantsche Provintien
1610	Hugo de Groot	Tractaet vande oudtheyt vande Batavische nu Hollandsche republique
1612	Jacob van der Schuere	Nederduytsche spellinge
1612	Willem Meerman	Comoedia vetus
1613	Justus de Harduwijn	De weerliicke liefden tot Roose-mond
1614	Roemer Visscher	Sinnepoppen
1614	H.L. Spiegel	Hert-spiegel
1616	Daniël Heinsius	Nederduytsche poemata
1618	Nicolaus Mulerius	Hemelsche trompet morgenwecker
1619	Jacob Cats	Aenmerckinghe op de tegenwoordige steert-sterre
1620	Anthoni Smyters	Epitheta
1623	anonymous	Zeeusche Nachtegael
1625	Hugo de Groot	De iure belli ac pacis
1625	Jacob Cats	Houwelick
1626	Adriaen Valerius	Nederlandtsche gedenck-clanck
1630	D.V. Coornhert	Works (3 parts)
1630	Jacobus Revius	Over-Ysselsche sangen en dichten (songs and poems from Overijssel)
1631	Salomon de Bray	Architectura moderna ofte bouwinge van onsen tyt
1632	C. Barlaeus	Mercator sapiens
1637	Jacob Cats	Trouringh
1637	anonymous	Biblia, vervattende alle de canonijcke Boecken des Ouden en des Nieuwen Testaments (Statenvertaling)
1641	Jan Adriaansz Leeghwater	Haerlemmermeerboeck
1642–1647	P.C. Hooft	Nederlandsche Historien
1642	Philips Angel	Lof der schilder-konst
1644	Dirck Pietersz. Pers	Cesare Ripa's Iconologia of Uytbeeldinghen des Verstants
1644	Johan de Brune	Wetsteen der vernuften
1646	A. Poirters	Het masker van de wereldt afgetrocken
1646	Willem Bontekoe	Journael ofte gedenckwaerdige beschrijvinge (Travelogue)
1649	A.L. Kok	Ont-werp der Neder-duitsche letter-konst (Dutch literary art)
1650	anonymous	't Muyder-spoockje
1651	Jeremias de Decker	Goede vrydag ofte Het lijden onses heeren Jesu Christi
1652	anonymous	Het Hollants wijve-praetjen
1652–1662	Jan van Riebeeck	Dagverhaal
1652	Anna Maria van Schurman	Opuscula Hebraea Graeca Latina et Gallica
1653	Constantijn Huygens	Hofwijck (Poem written about the estate)
ca. 1657	Jan Zoet	't Groote visch-net
1657	Joannes Six van Chandelier	Poësy
1658	Johannes Amos Comenius	Portael der saecken en spraecken
1659	Abraham Palingh	't Afgerukt mom-aansight der tooverye
1660	Johan van Beverwijck	Schat der gesontheyt
1660	Joan Baptista van Helmont	Dageraed
1662	Pieter de la Court	Interest van Holland, ofte gronden van Hollands-Welvaren
1662	Cornelis de Bie	Het gulden cabinet van de edel vry schilderconst
1667	Constantijn Huygens	Zee-straet
1668	Adriaan Koerbagh	Een bloemhof van allerley lieflijkheyd sonder verdriet
1669	Aernout van Overbeke	Geestige en vermaecklycke reijs beschrijving naar Oost-Indiën
1671	Jan Luyken	Duytse lier
1671	Johan de Witt	Waerdye van lyf-rente naer proportie van los-renten
1672	anonymous	Hollants venezoen, en geopent voor de liefhebbers van 't vaderlandt
1672	anonymous	D'oprechte Oranje oogen-salf
1677	Baruch Spinoza	Posthumously published writings
1677	Andries Pels	Q. Horatius Flaccus dichtkunst op onze tijden en zeden gepast
1677	Baruch Spinoza	Ethica
1678	Willem G. van Focquenbroch	Afrikaense Thalia
1678	Cornelis Bontekoe	Tractaat van het excellenste kruyd thee
1678	Samuel van Hoogstraten	Inleyding tot de hooge schoole der schilderkonst: anders de zichtbaere werelt
1681	anonymous	't Amsterdamsch hoerdom
1682	Hieronymus Sweerts	oddige en ernstige opschriften, op luyffens, wagens, glazen, uithangborden en andere taferelen
1682	Geeraardt Brandt	The Life of Joost van den Vondel
1687	Lieven van Waarmond	Hollands koors
1687	Geeraardt Brandt	The Life and Deeds of the Lord Michiel de Ruyter
1688	Josseph de la Vega	Confusion de Confusiones
1690	Govert Bidloo	Ontleding des menschelyken lichaam
1690	Jan van der Heyden	Description of newly invented and patented fire hoses, now being used in Amsterdam
1690	Nicolaas Witsen	Aaloude en hedendaagsche scheeps-bouw en bestier
1691	Johannes Duijkerius	The Life of Philopater
1691–1693	Balthasar Bekker	De betoverde wereld
1692–1702	Pieter Rabus	De boekzaal van Europe
1695	Nicolaas Heinsius	Den vermakelyken avanturier

== 18th century ==
year	author	title
1700	anonymous	De kloekmoedige land en zee-heldin
1703	Frederik van Leenhof	Den hemel op aarden
1705	Lukas Rotgans	Eneas en Turnus
1705	Bernard Mandeville	The Grumbling Hive, or Knaves Turn'd Honest
1707	Gérard de Lairesse	Groot schilderboek
1708	Lukas Rotgans	Boerekermis
1708	Jan Luyken	Beschouwing der wereld
1708	Hendrik Smeeks	Beschryvinge van het magtig Koningryk Krinke Kesmes
1710	Lambert ten Kate Hz.	Gemeenschap tussen de Gottische spraeke en de Nederduytsche
1710	anonymous	Nederduitse en Latynse keurdigten
1711	Jakob Zeeus	De wolf in 't schaepsvel
1711	Cornelis de Bruyn	Reizen over Moskovie
1714	Pieter Langendijk	Het wederzyds huwelyksbedrog
1714	Jan Luyken	Geestelyke brieven
1716–1722	H.K. Poot	Mengeldichten
1718–1721	Arnold Houbraken	De groote schouburgh der Nederlantsche konstschilders en schilderessen (3 parts)
1719	Balthazar Huydecoper	Achilles
1720	Lambert Bidloo	Panpoëticon Batavum
1720	anonymous	Het groote Tafereel der dwaasheid
1720	Bernard Nieuwentijt	Het regt gebruik der werelt beschouwingen
1723	Lambert ten Kate Hz.	Aenleiding tot de kennisse van het verhevene deel der Nederduitsche sprake (2 parts)
1730	Balthazar Huydecoper	Proeve van taal- en dichtkunde
1731–1735	Justus van Effen	De Hollandse Spectator
1733	anonymous	Nieuwe verhandeling vande hoofsche welgemanierdheyt
1737	Jan Swammerdam	Bybel der natuure of historie der insecten (2 parts)
1741	Herman Boerhaave	Kortbondige spreuken wegens de ziektens
1742	Willem van Haren	Leonidas en Lierzangen
1744	Fredericus Ruysch	Alle de ontleed- genees- en heelkundige werken
1746	anonymous	De volmaakte Hollandsche keuken-meid
1746	Albertus Frese & Christiaan Schaaf	De electriciteit; of Pefroen
1748	anonymous	De weergalooze Amsterdamsche kiekkas
1749–1759	Petrus Loosjes Azn & Jan Wagenaar	Vaderlandsche historie
1754	anonymous	Karmans kermis-wensch
1756	Jan Willem Kals	Neerlands hooft- en wortelsonde
1763–1774	Various	De Denker (Magazine in 12 issues)
1766	R.M. van Goens	'Vrymoedige bedenkingen over de vergelyking der oude dichteren met de hedendaegschen'
1766	Juliana Cornelia de Lannoy	Aan mynen geest
1769	Onno Zwier van Haren	Agon
1769	J. le Francq van Berkhey	Natuurlyke historie van Holland. Eerste deel
1770	Petrus Camper	Berigt van den zaaklyken inhoud van twee lessen
1773	anonymous	Het boek der psalmen
1775	anonymous	Ongelukkige levensbeschrijving van een Amsterdammer
1777–1779	J.F. Martinet	Katechismus der natuur (4 parts)
1778–1782	Hieronymus van Alphen	Kleine gedigten voor kinderen
1779	J.F. Martinet	Kleine katechismus der natuur voor kinderen
1780	Willem van Hogendorp	Kraspoekol, jegens de slaaven
1781	Aagje Deken & Betje Wolff	Economische liedjes
1781	Martinus van Marum	Schets der elektriciteit-kunde
1781	J.H. Swildens	Vaderlandsch A-B boek voor de Nederlandsche jeugd
1781	Joan Derk van der Capellen tot den Pol	Aan het volk van Nederland
1781	Simon Stijl	The Life of Jan Punt
1782	Aagje Deken & Betje Wolff	Historie van mejuffrouw Sara Burgerhart
1782	Willem Emmery de Perponcher	Onderwijs voor kinderen
1782	Jacobus Bellamy	Songs of my youth
1783	Rhijnvis Feith	Julia
1784–1793	Rhijnvis Feith	Letters over various subjects (6 parts)
1784–1786	A. Mens Jansz	De Poetische Spectator
1786	Marten Corver	Tooneel-aantekeningen
1788	Johannes Kinker	De Post van den Helicon
1788	Jan-Baptist Chrysostomus Verlooy	Verhandeling op d'onacht der moederlyke tael in de Nederlanden
1788–1797	Willem Anthonij Ockerse	Ontwerp tot eene algemeene characterkunde (3 delen)
1789	anonymous	De zingende Kees
1789–1807	anonymous	Volks-liedjens
1792	Gerrit Paape	Mijne vrolijke wijsgeerte in mijne ballingschap
1794	Herman Willem Daendels	Aan zyne Geldersche en Overysselsche landgenooten
1794	Elisabeth Maria Post	Songs of Love
1797	Matthijs Siegenbeek	Redevoering over het openbaar onderwijs in de Nederduitsche welsprekendheid
1798	anonymous	Ontwerp van staatsregeling voor het Bataafsche volk

== 19th century ==
year	author	title
1800	Hendrik van Wijn	Historische en letterkundige avondstonden
1805	Petrus Weiland	Nederduitsche spraakkunst
1806	Jacob Haafner	Lotgevallen op eene reize van Madras over Tranquebaar naar het eiland Ceilon
1809	Willem Bilderdijk	De kunst der poëzy
1810	Jeronimo de Vries	Proeve eener geschiedenis der Nederduitsche dichtkunde
1818	J.F. Willems	Aen de Belgen. Aux Belges
1818	Johannes van den Bosch	Verhandeling over de mogelijkheid, de beste wijze van invoering, en de belangrijke voordeelen eender algemeene armen-inrigting in het Rijk der Nederlanden, door het vestigen eener Landbouwende Kolonie in deszelfs Noordelijk gedeelte
1818	Johannes van den Bosch	Nederlandsche bezittingen in Azia
1819–1824	J.F. Willems	Verhandeling over de Nederduytsche tael- en letterkunde
1820	Lodewijk Napoleon Bonaparte	Geschiedkundige gedenkstukken en aanmerkingen over het bestuur van Holland (3 parts)
1821–1827	P.G. Witsen Geysbeek	Biographisch anthologisch en critisch woordenboek der Nederduitsche dichters (6 parts)
1823	Isaäc da Costa	Bezwaren tegen den geest der eeuw
1824	Willem de Clercq	Verhandeling ter beandwoording der vraag welken invloed heeft vreemde, inzonderheid de Italiaansche, Spaansche, Fransche en Duitsche, gehad op de Nederlandsche taal- en letterkunde sints het begin der vijftiende eeuw tot op onze dagen?
1825	Jacob Eduard de Witte	Fragmenten uit de roman van mijn leeven
1830–1862	A.H. Hoffmann von Fallersleben	Horae Belgicae
1831	anonymous	De Belgische grondwet van 7 februari 1831
1832–1853	Willem Bilderdijk	Geschiedenis des vaderlands
1832	Aarnout Drost	Hermingard van de Eikenterpen
1834–1835	Van Engelen, with van Martinet, Nomsz, P. Loosjes, Dr. Simon de Vries & Hoffham	De muzen
1835–1847	G. Groen van Prinsterer	Archives ou correspondance inédite de la maison d'Orange-Nassau (Première série)
1835	Jacob Geel	Gesprek op den Drachenfels
1836	Jacob van Lennep	De roos van Dekama
1837–1846	J.F. Willems	Belgisch museum voor de Nederduitsche tael- en letterkunde en de geschiedenis des vaderlands
-1837	Various	De Gids (Magazine)
1838	J.F. Oltmans	De schaapherder
1838	Hendrik Conscience	De Leeuw van Vlaanderen
1840	A.L.G. Bosboom-Toussaint	Het huis Lauernesse
1842–1866	Jean Baptiste David	Vaderlandsche historie (11 parts)
1842–1844	Various	Braga: dichterlijke mengelingen (magazine)
1843	C.E. van Koetsveld	Schetsen uit de pastorij te Mastland
1845	Hendrik Conscience	Geschiedenis van België
1847	G. Groen van Prinsterer	Ongeloof en revolutie
1850	F. A. Snellaert	Schets eener geschiedenis der Nederlandsche letterkunde
1851	C.W. Opzoomer	De weg der wetenschap
1851	Friedrich Kaiser	De geschiedenis der ontdekkingen van planeten
1852	Willem Gerard Brill	Nederlandsche spraakleer (3 parts)
1854	W.R. van Hoëvell	Slaven en vrijen onder de Nederlandsche wet
1857	Christiaan Kramm	De levens en werken der Hollandsche en Vlaamsche kunstschilders, beeldhouwers, graveurs en bouwmeesters, van den vroegsten tot op onzen tijd (Biographies of Dutch and Flemish artists, sculptors, engravers, and architects)
1857	W.J. Hofdijk	Geschiedenis der Nederlandsche letterkunde
1858–1862	P.J. Harrebomée	Spreekwoordenboek der Nederlandsche taal
1858	Petrus Weiland	Kunstwoordenboek (3rd edition)
1858	Cd. Busken Huet	Letters over the Bible
1859	W.A. Holterman	De lucht
1859	De Schoolmeester	Letters from the Schoolmaster
1860	Multatuli	Max Havelaar of de koffiveilingen der Nederlandsche Handelmaatschappy
1860	Philippus Wilhelmus van Heusde	De Socratische school of Wijsgeerte voor de negentiende eeuw (3rd revised edition)
1861	J. Wolbers	Geschiedenis van Suriname
1861	Jan Pieter Heije	Al de kinderliederen
1861	Jan de Pottre	Dagboek 1549-1602 (edited by B. de St. Genois)
1861–1863	Isaäc da Costa	Complete Works (edited by J.P. Hasebroek)
1862–1877	Multatuli	Ideën (7 parts)
1863	J.J. Cremer	Fabriekskinderen
1863–1913	R.C. Bakhuizen van den Brink	Studiën en schetsen over vaderlandsche geschiedenis en letteren (5 parts)
1864	I.M. Calisch & N.S. Calisch	Nieuw woordenboek der Nederlandsche taal
1865	Jacob van Lennep	De vermakelijke spraakkunst
1866	J.J.L. ten Kate	De schepping
1867–1868	Jan ter Gouw & Jacob van Lennep	De uithangteekens
1868–1885	Cd. Busken Huet	Litterarische fantasien en kritieken (26 parts)
1868	Cd. Busken Huet	Lidewyde
1869	Willem de Clercq	From his Diary (edited by Allard Pierson)
ca. 1870	Anton Bergmann	Ernest Staas
1870	Willem van Hildegaersberch	Poems (editors W. Bisschop & E. Verwijs)
1871–1925	C.P. Hooft	Memoires and advice (2 parts, edited by H.A. Enno van Gelder)
1871	Jan ter Gouw	De volksvermaken
1872	P.A.S. van Limburg Brouwer	Akbar
1872	Jan Rudolf Thorbecke	Historical sketches
1872	Multatuli	Millioenen-studiën
1872	J. van Vloten	Dutch baker's and children's rhymes
1872	anonymous	Thet Oera Linda Bok (edited by J.G. Ottema)
1873	Jan Hendrik Wijnen	Child factory workers
1874	Johan Winkler	Algemeen Nederduitsch en Friesch Dialecticon (2 parts)
1875–1897	H.P.G. Quack	De socialisten: Personen en stelsels
1875–1884	Jacobus Craandijk	Wandelingen door Nederland met pen en potlood (7 parts)
1876–1888	Constantijn Huygens jr.	Journals 1673-1696 (4 parts)
1876	R. van der Meulen	Bibliography of technical arts and sciences 1850–1875
1876	J. Beckering Vinckers	De onechtheid van het Oera Linda-Bôk
1876	François HaverSchmidt	Family and friends
1876	Gerard Bilders	Letters and Diary
1877	Mina Kruseman	My Life
1877	B.H. Lulofs	The art of oral presentation or outward gentility
1877	Eugène Fromentin	The last great school of painting
1878–1881	John Lothrop Motley	The Rise of the Dutch Republic (12 parts in revised edition)
1878	David Bierens de Haan	Bouwstoffen voor de geschiedenis der wis- en natuurkundige wetenschappen in de Nederlanden
1878	J.H. van 't Hoff	De verbeeldingskracht in de wetenschap
1879	Alexander (prins der Nederlanden)	Een vermoedelijk slotwoord
ca. 1880	Hendrik Conscience	History of my youth
1880	Christiaan Snouck Hurgronje	Het Mekkaansche feest
-1881	Various	Tijdschrift voor Nederlandse Taal en Letterkunde (Magazine)
1882–1890	Taco H. de Beer	Onze volkstaal
1882	Heike Kamerlingh Onnes	The value of quantitative research in Physics
1882	Albrecht Rodenbach	Gudrun
1882	A.W. Engelen	Uit de gedenkschriften van een voornaam Nederlandsch beambte
1882-84	Cd. Busken Huet	Het land van Rembrand (The land of Rembrandt)
1882	Onno Harmensz Sytstra & Pieter Jelles Troelstra	It jonge Fryslân
1883–1885, 1928	Jan Izaak van Doorninck & A. de Kempenaer	Pseudonyms and Anonymous Dutch and Flemish writers identified (3 parts)
1885–1943	Various	De Nieuwe Gids (Magazine)
1885	Frederik van Eeden	Grassprietjes (published under the pseudonym Cornelis Paradijs)
1885	Willem Einthoven	Stereoscopie door kleurverschil
1886	Willem Kloos & Albert Verwey	De onbevoegdheid der Hollandsche literaire kritiek
1887	P.A. Daum	Goena-goena
1887	Lodewijk van Deyssel	A Love
1887	anonymous	The labor census of 1887
1887	B.J. Stokvis	Nationaliteit en natuurwetenschap
1887	S.E.W. Roorda van Eysinga	Uit het leven van Koning Gorilla
1888–1891	F. Jos. van den Branden & J.G. Frederiks	Biographisch woordenboek der Noord- en Zuidnederlandsche letterkunde (Biographical dictionary of North and South Netherlandish Literature)
1888	Jac. Schoondermark	Treatment of constipation with electricity
1888–1950	Christiaan Huygens	Complete Works (22 parts)
1889	Herman Gorter	Mei (Poem)
1889	F.A. Stoett	Middle Dutch Speech and Syntax
1890	C.A. Verrijn Stuart	Ricardo en Marx
1891	C.J. Kieviet	From the Life of Dik Trom
1891	Louise Stratenus	De opvoeding der vrouw
1892	Georges Rodenbach	Bruges-la-Morte
1892	Frans Coenen	Boredom
1892	C.J. Kieviet	Fulco de minstreel
1892–1896	C.H. den Hertog	Dutch Speech
1893	Pim Mulier	Winter sport
1893–1903	H.J.A.M. Schaepman	Menschen en boeken: verspreide opstellen (5 parts)
1893–1901	Various	Van Nu en Straks (Magazine)
1894	Marcellus Emants	Een nagelaten bekentenis
1894	anonymous	Middle Dutch medical prescriptions and treatments
1895	Émile Verhaeren	Poems
1896	Charles de Coster	The Legend of Uilenspiegel (translation by R. Delbecq)
1897	Justus van Maurik	Indrukken van een 'Tòtòk'
1897–1899	H.T. Colenbrander	De patriottentijd (3 parts, about the Dutch Patriots)
1897	Eli Heimans & Jac. P. Thijsse	Hei en dennen
1897	Hans Bontemantel	The Government of Amsterdam
1897	Cécile de Jong van Beek en Donk	Hilda van Suylenburg
1898	Tobias Michael Carel Asser	Institut de Droit International: session de La Haye
1898	Christiaan Eijkman	Over gezondheid en ziekte in heete gewesten
1898–1909	Geryt Potter van der Loo	Johan Froissart's Cronyke van Vlaenderen (edited by N. de Pauw)
1899	Robert Fruin	Ten years from the Eighty Years' War

== 20th century (up to 1930s) ==
year	author	title
1899	Abraham Kuyper	Het calvinisme. Zes Stone-lezingen
1900	Bernard Canter	Twee weken bedelaar
1900	Top Naeff	School-idyllen
1900	Herman Heijermans	Op hoop van zegen
1900	Louis Couperus	De stille kracht
1901	J. te Winkel	History of the Dutch language
1901	H.A. Lorentz	Visible and Invisible motion
1902	Betsy Perk	Jacques Perk
1902	Johann Bernard Krier	De wellevendheid (Dutch edition by A.F. Diepen)
1902	Henriette Roland Holst-van der Schalk	Capital and Labor in the Netherlands
1902	Hugo de Vries	Theorie en ervaring op het gebied der afstammingsleer
1903	August De Winne	Door arm Vlaanderen
1903	Guido Gezelle	Dichtwerken
1904	Jac. P. Thijsse	Het vogeljaar
1904	Jacob Israël de Haan	Pijpelijntjes
1904	C.C. van de Graft	Middle Dutch history songs
1904	Aagje Deken & Betje Wolff	Letters by Betje Wolff & Aagtje Deken (edited by Joh. Dyserinck)
1904	Gustaaf Vermeersch	De last
1905	Jacob Israël de Haan	Open brief aan P.L. Tak
1905	Margo Scharten-Antink	Sprotje
1906–1909	Paul Fredericq	Schets eener geschiedenis der Vlaamsche Beweging
1906	Louis Couperus	Van oude menschen, die voorbijgaan…
1906	Nico van Suchtelen	Quia absurdum
1907–1995	Various	De Nieuwe Taalgids (Magazine)
1908–1909	André de Ridder & Herman Robbers	Our writers sketched in their life and works (2 parts)
1908	K. de Boer & J. Veldkamp	Kun je nog zingen
1909	Anna de Savornin Lohman	Memoires
1909	Eli Heimans, Hein Willems Heinsius and Jac. P. Thijsse	Illustrated Flora of the Netherlands
1909	J.D. van der Waals	Over de vraag naar de meest fundamenteele wetten der natuur
1909	G.J.P.J. Bolland	Zuivere rede en hare werkelijkheid
1910	Ferdinand Domela Nieuwenhuis	From Christian to Anarchist
1911–1917	Constantijn Huygens	Letters (edited by J.A. Worp in 6 parts)
1911–1937	P.J. Blok & P.C. Molhuysen	New Dutch Biographical Dictionary (10 parts)
1911	Geerten Gossaert	Experiments
1912	M.J. Brusse	Het rosse leven en sterven van de Zandstraat
1913	H.P.G. Quack	Memories from the life of Mr. H.P.G. Quack 1834–1913
1914–1917	Herman Daniël Benjamins & Joh. F. Snelleman	Encyclopaedia of Nederlandsch West-Indië
1914	K.H. Roessingh	The Modern Theology in the Netherlands
1914	D.A. Stracke	Arm Vlaanderen (Poor Flanders)
1914	Vincent van Gogh	Letters to his brother (3 parts, edited by J. van Gogh-Bonger)
1914–1918	Virginie Loveling	In oorlogsnood (War diary)
1915	Jos. Schrijnen	Nederlandsche volkskunde (2 parts)
ca. 1915	D. Turkenburg	Turkenburg's handbook for growing vegetables in the wild
1915	Frits Zernike	De mechanica der kleinste deeltjes
1915–1916	Stijn Streuvels	In oorlogstijd (War diary)
1915	J.B. Schuil	De A.F.C.-ers
1915	Herman Gorter	Het imperialisme
1915	Gerardus Heymans	Het psychisch monisme
1915	M.H.J. Schoenmaekers	Het nieuwe wereldbeeld
1915	Various	Gids voor iedereen (Magazine)
1916	Albert Verwey	Holland en de oorlog
1916–1917	Jan Ligthart	Verspreide opstellen
1916	René de Clercq	De noodhoorn
1916	Felix Timmermans	Pallieter
1916	Johanna Breevoort	Stomme zonden
1917	Daan Boens	Van glorie en lijden
1917	H.J.E. Endepols & Jac. van Ginneken	De regenboogkleuren van Nederlands taal
1917–1932	Various	De Stijl (Magazine)
1918	J.A. Worp	Een onwaerdeerlycke vrouw (Letters and verses to and from Maria Tesselschade)
1918	August van Cauwelaert	Liederen van droom en daad
1919	W.G. van de Hulst	Peerke en z'n kameraden
1919	Johan Huizinga	Herfsttij der Middeleeuwen
1920	Wies Moens	Letters from prison
1920	Filip de Pillecyn & Jozef Simons	Onder den hiel
1920	Ernest Claes	De Witte
1920	J.A. Worp	History of the Amsterdam schouwburg 1496–1772
1920	Constant van Wessem	De muzikale reis
1922–1927	J. te Winkel	De ontwikkelingsgang der Nederlandsche letterkunde (7 parts)
1922	Jac. van Ginneken	De roman van een kleuter
1922	Ferdinand Domela Nieuwenhuis	Handboek van den vrijdenker
1923	Pieter Zeeman	Metingen in een spektroskopisch laboratorium en de bouw der atomen
1923	Johan Fabricius	De Scheepsjongens van Bontekoe
1923	J. Verdam	Uit de geschiedenis der Nederlandsche taal (4th edition)
1923	Chr. van Abkoude	Kruimeltje (later made into the film Little Crumb)
1923	Jozef Simons	Eer Vlaanderen vergaat
1923–1925	F.A. Stoett	Dutch proverbs and sayings (4th edition)
1923	André Jolles	Bezieling en vorm
1923–1924	P.J. Blok	History of the Dutch people (4 parts, 3rd revised edition)
1924	Aletta Jacobs	Memoires of Dr. Aletta H. Jacobs
1924	Johan Huizinga	Erasmus
1925	Jo van Ammers-Küller	De opstandigen
1925	Reinier van Genderen Stort	Kleine Inez
1925	Carry van Bruggen	Hedendaagsch fetischisme
1925–1928	A.M. de Jong	Merijntje Gijzen's jeugd
1925	I.J. Brugmans	De arbeidende klasse in Nederland in de 19e eeuw (1813-1870)
1926	Th.H. van de Velde	Het volkomen huwelijk
1926	Johanna Greidanus	Beginselen en ontwikkeling van de interpunctie
1927–1931	Pieter Jelles Troelstra	Gedenkschriften
1927	G.G. Kloeke	De Hollandsche expansie in de zestiende en zeventiende eeuw en haar weerspiegeling in de hedendaagsche Nederlandsche dialecten
1927–1937	Joost van den Vondel	Complete Works (10 parts, WB-edition)
1927	Leonard Roggeveen	De ongeloofelijke avonturen van Bram Vingerling
ca. 1928	anonymous	Officieele gids voor de Olympische Spelen ter viering van de IXe Olympiade
1928–2001	Hugo de Groot	Letters (17 parts)
1929	Willem Pijper	De quintencirkel
1929	Amaat Burssens	Een Vlaming op reis door Kongo
1929	Matthijs Vermeulen	Klankbord
1929	Joris van den Bergh	Te midden der kampioenen
1930–1933	Maurits Basse	De Vlaamsche Beweging van 1905 tot 1930
ca. 1930	anonymous	Handboek van den soldaat (KAJ Brussel)
1930	Ina Boudier-Bakker	De klop op de deur
1930	J. Slauerhoff	Schuim en asch
1931	Madelon Szekely-Lulofs	Rubber
1931	C. Elsbach, H.T. de Graaf, H.J. Jordan, K.F. Proost & G.H. van Senden	Encyclopaedisch handboek van het moderne denken (2 parts)
1931	Albert Helman	De stille plantage
1932–1933	Various	Links richten
1932	Theo Thijssen	Het taaie ongerief
1932–1935	Various	FORUM Maandschrift voor Letteren en Kunst
1932	Alexander Cohen	In opstand
1932–1934	J.G.M. Moormann	De geheimtalen
1932	E.P.F. Morlion	Filmkunst (special edition Dietsche Warande en Belfort)
1932	Jan Engelman	Tuin van Eros
1933	Maurits Dekker	Roodboek
1933	Arthur van Schendel	De waterman
1933	Maurits Sabbe	Brabant in 't verweer
1933	Willem Elsschot	Kaas (Cheese)
1933	Albert Helman	Talking film
1933	E. du Perron	Hours with Dirk Coster
1934	Wilhelmina Hendrika de Groot en Fréderique Mathilde Stoll	Recipes of the Huishoud school on the Laan van Meerdervoort in The Hague
1934	Antoon Coolen	Village on the river
1934	Julius Röntgen	Letters
1934	Willem de Sitter	Kosmos
1934	Franz de Backer	Longinus
1934	Jan Romein & Annie Romein-Verschoor	De lage landen bij de zee
1935–1936	Herman Dooyeweerd	De wijsbegeerte der wetsidee
1935	Anne de Vries	Bartje
1935	Max Euwe & Albert Loon	Oom Jan leert zijn neefje schaken
1935	Jacob Bicker Raye	Het dagboek van Jacob Bicker Raye 1732-1772 (edited by F. Beijerinck & M.G. de Boer)
1935	Johannes Nowee & Paulus Nowee	Arendsoog

For the rest of the 20th century and works from the 21st century, see the second half of the list.

== See also ==
- Dutch Literature
- Canon of Dutch Literature
- Canon of the Netherlands
- Books in the Netherlands
