= Dodecapharmacum =

A dodecapharmacum is a medicine of twelve ingredients.

The best known was the Apostles' Ointment (Latin: Apostolorum unguentum), or Ointment of Venus (Latin: unguentum Veneris) which was an ointment attributed to Avicenna (d.1037) made of twelve ingredients. The ingredients were turpentine, wax, gum ammoniac, birthwort roots, olibanum, bdellium, myrrh and galbanum, opoponax, verdigris, litharge, plus olive oil, and vinegar.

Avicenna describes the ingredients and proportions of such a recipe in Qanun V.1.11. Some later writers have questioned whether the title of the recipe "Ointment of the Apostles," or "Ointment of Venus" were used by Avicenna himself, however when an Arabic version of the Canon of Medicine (القانون في الطب) was first printed in 1593 in Rome, recipe no. 442 (Arabic ٤٤٢) was entitled "ointment of the Apostles" (Arabic: مرهم الرسل marham ur rusul). The name "Ointment of the Apostles" for the 12-ingredient recipe appears in the works of the Dominican priest Teodorico Borgognoni (1267) and the Inventarium sive chirugia magna of Guy de Chauliac (1330s). Renaissance pharmacy texts such as the Antidotarium Romanum (Rome, 1590) also include the recipe as Unguentem Apostolorum. The Arabic equivalent of the Latin Unguentum Apostolorum is found in later Arabic medical texts such as the translations into Arabic of the Nestorian Christian physician David of Antioch (d.1596).

Naming of the ointment of the Apostles as ointment of Venus occurs in the works of Jehan Yperman (c.1260-c.1330). However many remedies were called "..of Venus" and also widely known in antiquity was an eye-salve called "the plaster of Isis" distinct from later "Ointment of Venus."

Mirza Ghulam Ahmad (Urdu 1899) claimed that this ointment was known as the "Ointment of Jesus" (Arabic: مرهم عيسى marham-i-Isa) and had helped Jesus recover from the wounds of crucifixion, in support of his claim that Jesus did not die upon the Cross and was saved. Mirza Ghulam Ahmad claimed that he was the Promised Messiah and Mahdi.
