= Marcus van Vaernewyck =

Dutch historian (1518–1569)

Marcus van Vaernewijck
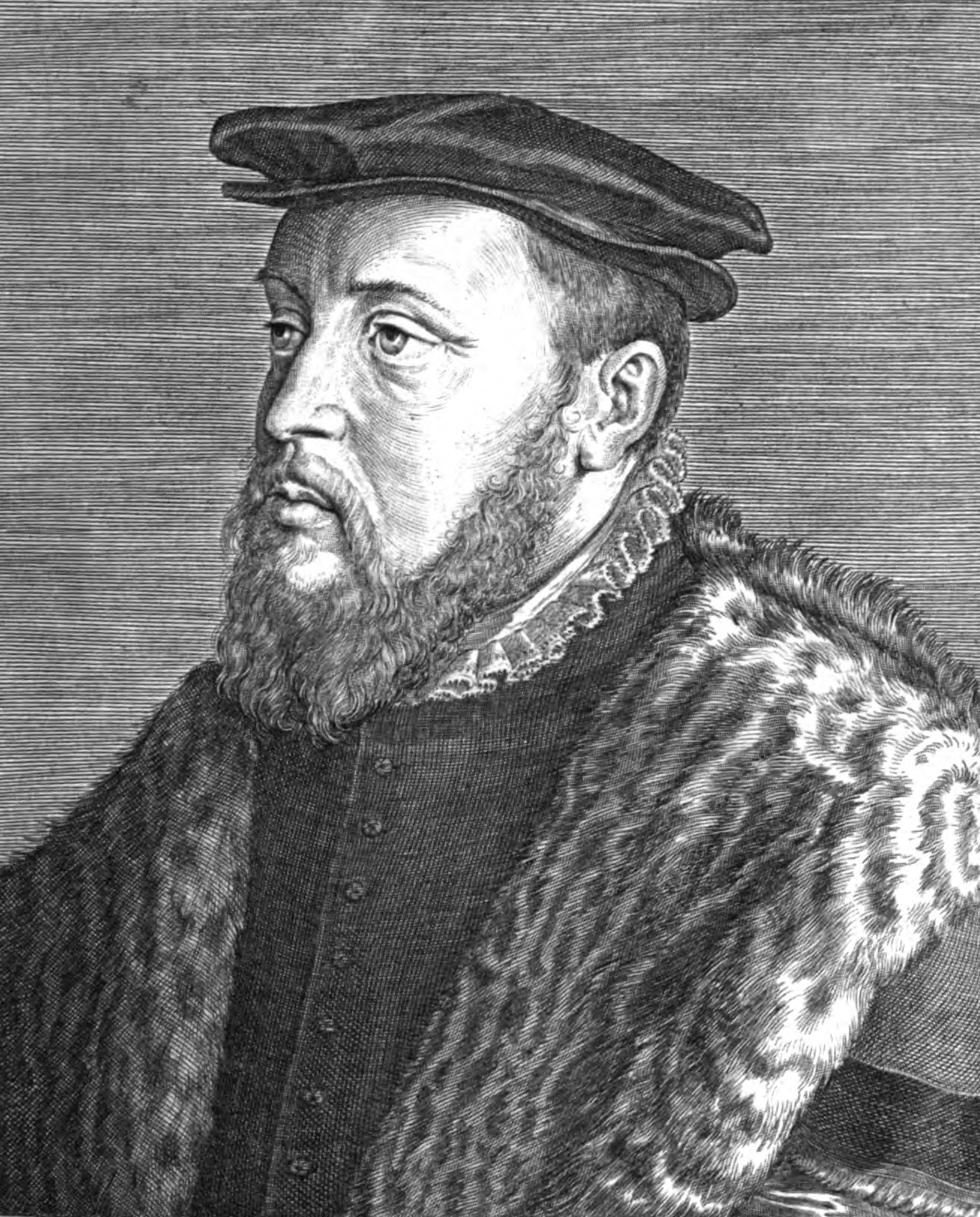
- Portrait of Marcus van Vaernewijck by Pieter de Jode II
- Born: 21 December 1518; Ghent, County of Flanders, Habsburg Netherlands
- Died: 20 February 1569 (aged 50); Ghent, County of Flanders, Habsburg Netherlands
- Citizenship: Ghent
- Spouse: Levina Hallijns
- Writing career
- Language: Dutch
- Period: Renaissance
- Subject: History
- Notable works: Van die beroerlicke tijden De historie van Belgis

Marcus van Vaernewijck (1518–1569) was a historian in the Habsburg Netherlands. Two of his works, Van die beroerlicke tijden in die Nederlanden en voornamelick in Ghendt 1566-1568 and De historie van Belgis, are listed in the Canon of Dutch Literature compiled by the Digital Library for Dutch Literature.

== Life ==
Van Vaernewijck was born in Ghent on 21 December 1518, to Marcus van Vaernewijck and Catharina van Steenhaut. After travels to Italy (1550) and throughout the Low Countries (1556), he returned to Ghent and settled down. In 1558, he married Levina Hallijns. In 1563, he served as commissioner of the poor of the city, and in 1564 and 1568 as alderman. He was also an active member of the chamber of rhetoric Maria t'eeren. He died in Ghent on 20 February 1569.

== Writings ==
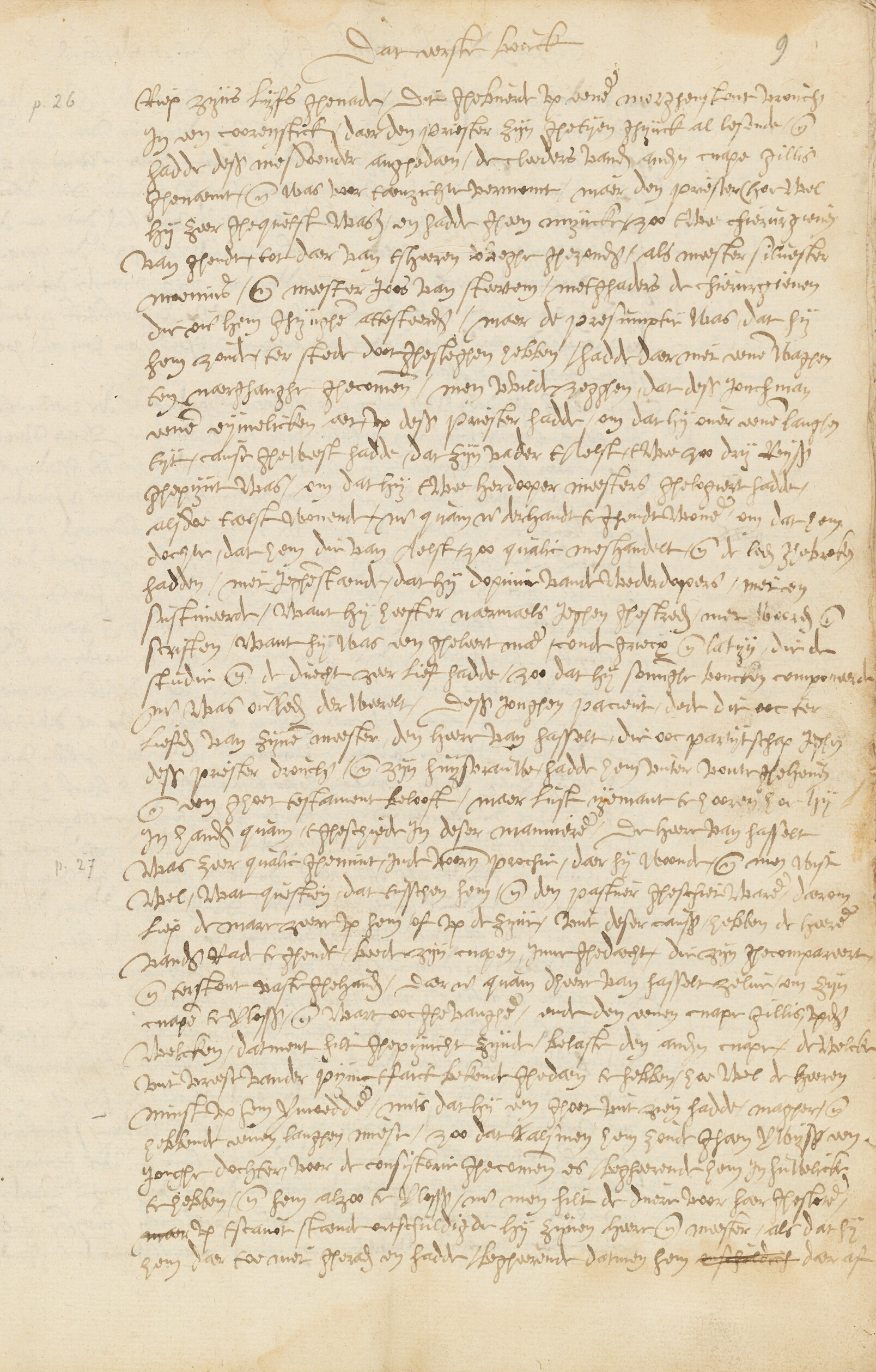
Excerpt from the manuscript of "Van die beroerlicke tijden in die Nederlanden", produced in the second half of the 16th century. Preserved in Ghent University Library.

- Vlaemsche audvremdigheyt, inhoudende veel wonderlicke antiquiteiten (Ghent, Geraert van Salensen, 1560)
- Nieu tractaet en corte beschrijvinghe van dat edel Graefschap van Vlaenderen (Ghent, Geraert van Salensen, 1562)
- De cronijcke van Vlaenderen in 't corte (Ghent, Geraert van Salensen, 1563)
- Den spiegel der Nederlandtsche oudheyt (Ghent, Geraert van Salensen, 1568)
- De Historie van Belgis (Ghent, Widow of Geraert van Salensen, 1574)

His unpublished chronicle, Van die beroerlicke tijden in die Nederlanden was edited by Ferdinand Vanderhaeghen for publication by the Maetschappy der Vlaemsche Bibliophilen in five volumes (1872–1881).
