= Leven van Lutgart =

The Leven van Lutgart or Leven van Sinte Lutgart is a 13th-century anonymous Middle Dutch verse hagiography of St Lutgardis, sometimes attributed to William of Afflighem, based on the Latin Vita Lutgardis by Thomas of Cantimpré. The Digital Library for Dutch Literature lists it as one of the thousand works in the Basic Library of Dutch Literature.

Originally compiled in three books, the second and third survive in an illuminated manuscript in the Royal Library, Copenhagen (shelfmark NKS 168 kvart). These were first published in an edition by Frans van Veerdeghem in 1899. A partial translation into contemporary Dutch was published in 1996.
