= Jacobus Craandijk =

Dutch Mennonite teacher and minister

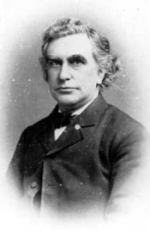
Craandijk before 1888

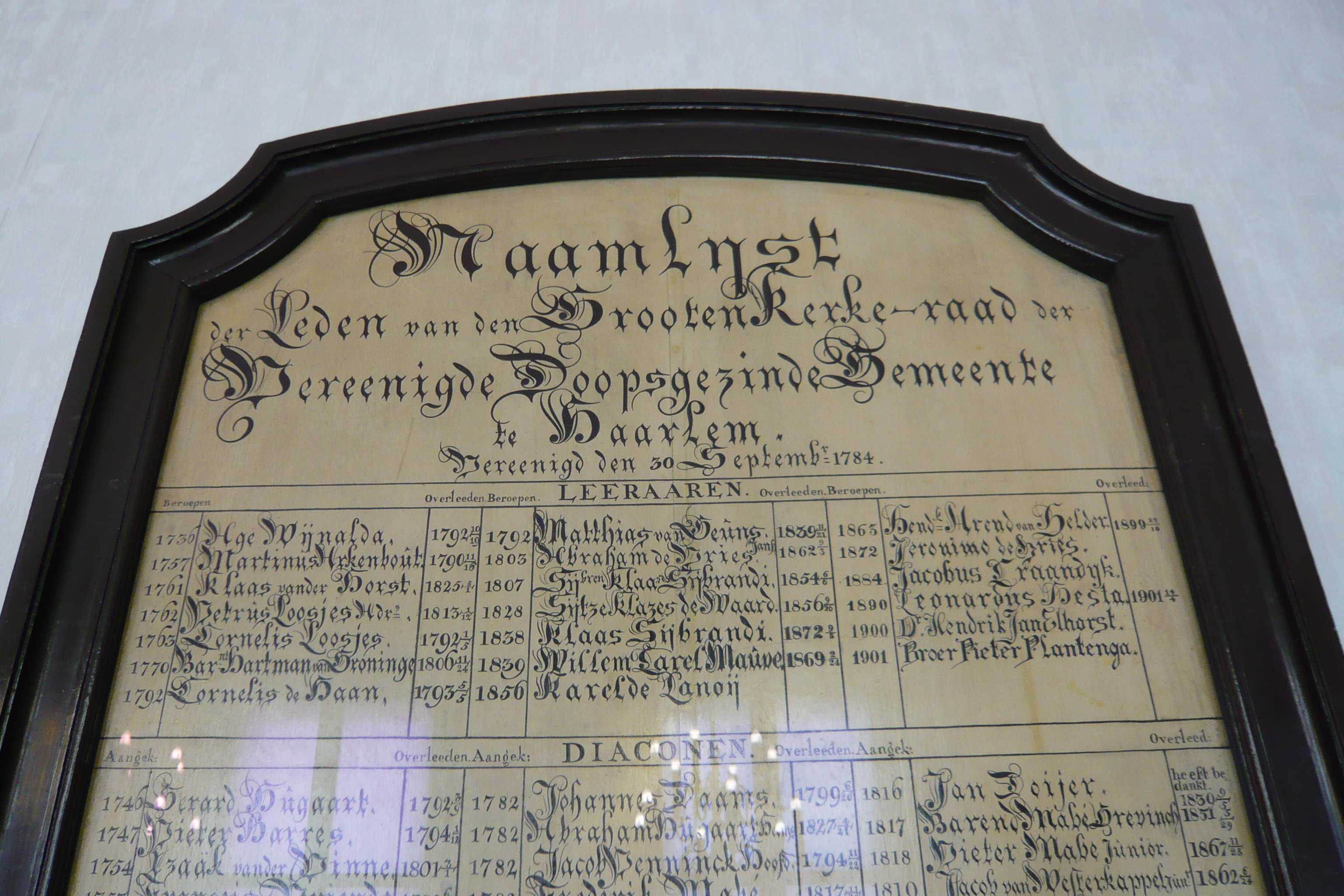
Jacobus Craandijk's name as "teacher, called 1884" in the Doopsgezinde kerk, Haarlem

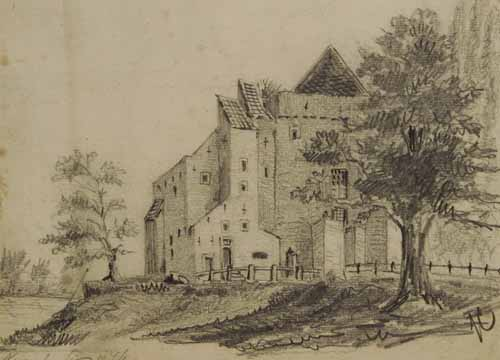
Castle Nijenbeek in Voorst, from one of Craandijk's walks

Jacobus Craandijk (7 September 1834, in Amsterdam – 3 June 1912, in Haarlem) was a Dutch Mennonite teacher and minister who enjoyed using his spare time for walks while taking notes and drawing.

He was trained at the Amsterdam Mennonite seminary and first served in Borne from 1859, where he met and later married Anna Geertruida Ballot in 1861. He then served in Rotterdam from 1862, where he served on the board of the Rotterdam-based Nederlandsch Zendelings Genootschap (Dutch Mission Society) from 1864. In 1869 he wrote the book Het Nederlandsch zendelinggenootschap in zijn willen en werken, in which he reported on the goals and more and less successful results of that society since its inception. It upset him to see that each religion set up its own missionary work, which in his opinion, was a waste of resources. In general, he aimed to persuade people of all faiths to invest in one Missionary society as a way to join forces for good in the third world. To this end, he tried but failed to win support for government-sponsored third-world development projects. In 1879 Van Craandijk organized and presided over a conference of prominent Dutch Mennonite leaders held at Amsterdam. In 1884 he was called to serve in the Doopsgezinde kerk, Haarlem, where he stayed. In 1897 he spoke at the centennial celebration of the Dutch Missionary society, and he also wrote a memorial boek Gedenkboek for the occasion.

Today he is best known for his "Walks with pen and pencil", a series of books with illustrations based on notes he made while walking in various parishes. Together these books form an important archival record and can be seen as early tourist literature. This seven-part series is listed as one of the 1000 most important texts in the Canon of Dutch Literature. He is known for 135 drawings of Dutch castles.

== Walks with pen and pencil ==
- Wandelingen door Nederland met pen en potlood. Part 1 (1875)
- Wandelingen door Nederland met pen en potlood. Part 2 (1876)
- Wandelingen door Nederland met pen en potlood. Part 3 (1878)
- Wandelingen door Nederland met pen en potlood. Part 4 (1879)
- Wandelingen door Nederland met pen en potlood. Part 5 (1880)
- Wandelingen door Nederland met pen en potlood. Part 6 (1882)
- Wandelingen door Nederland met pen en potlood. Part 7 (1884)
- Nieuwe wandelingen door Nederland (1888)
