= Jacob Bicker Raije =

Writer from the Northern Netherlands

- Born: August 15, 1703; Amsterdam
- Died: June 18, 1777 (aged 73); Amsterdam
- Parent(s): Jan Raye and Alida Catharina Bicker
- Relatives: Joan Raye, Governor of Suriname (brother)

Jacob Bicker Raije or Jacob Raije (August 15, 1703 – June 18, 1777) was a writer from the Dutch Republic.

Bicker Raije was born in Amsterdam as the son of Jan Raye and Alida Catharina Bicker. Bicker Raye was a member of the Bicker family through his mother, whose name he added to his own. He held a number of administrative positions in the local government of Amsterdam but is best known today for his diary, which was republished in 1935 and is listed in the Canon of Dutch Literature as one of the 1,000 most important texts of the Dutch language.

Raije died in Amsterdam.
