= Masters of Dirc van Delf =

Group of manuscript painters in Netherlands active between 1400 and 1410

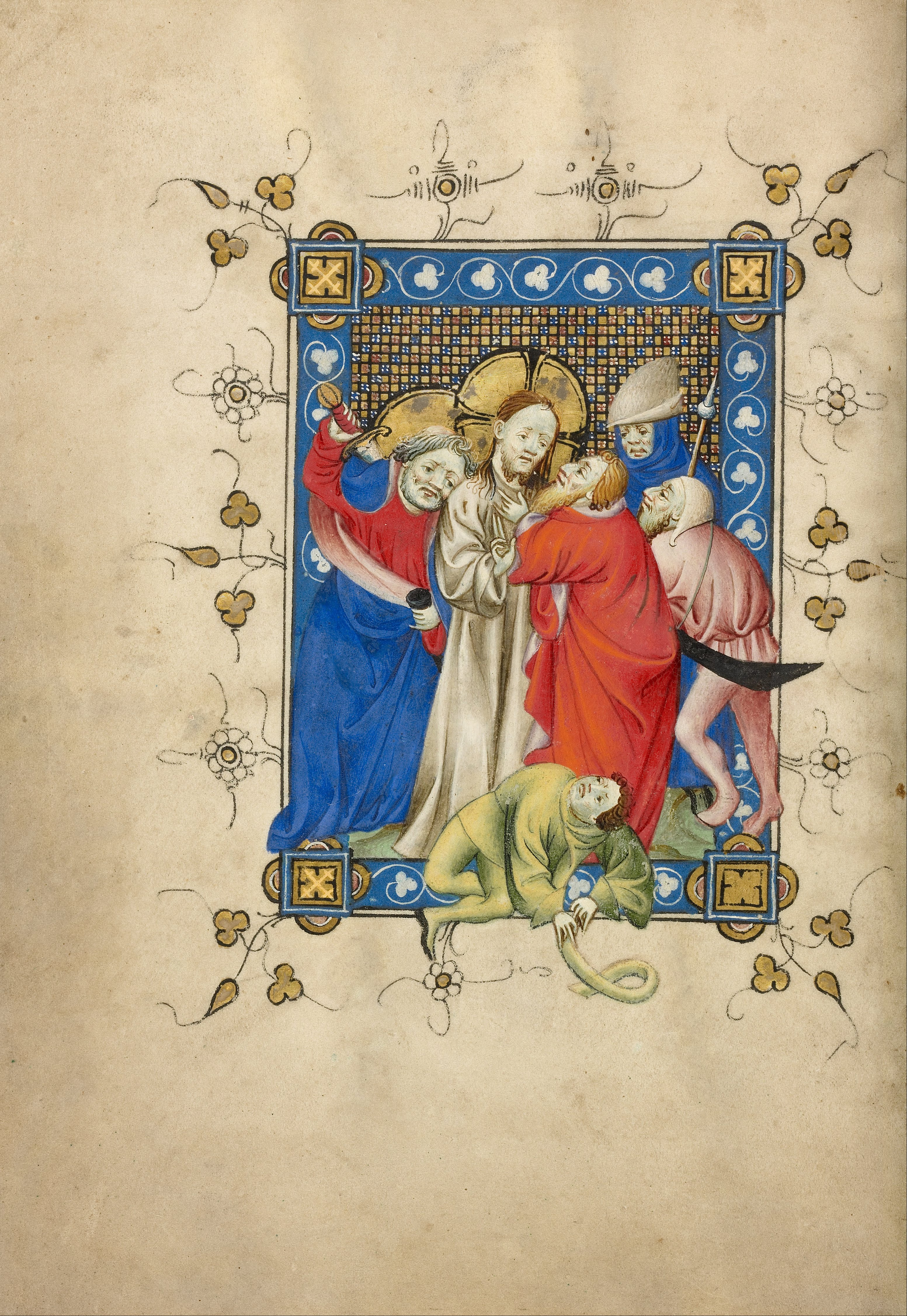
Judas betraying Christ from Getty MS 40

The Masters of Dirc van Delf were a group of manuscript painters active in the Netherlands between 1400 and around 1410. The name has been appended to several unknown artists who together make up an important studio of illuminators, one of the first important ones known from fifteenth-century Holland. Their name is derived from the lavish work they did to illustrate devotional texts by Dirc van Delf, court chaplain to Albrecht of Bavaria from 1389 until 1404 in The Hague. The studio's artists, combined with Dirc, played an important role in the new cultural life of the royal court in the Netherlands.

Paintings by the Masters may be found in the collections of the J. Paul Getty Museum in Los Angeles, California.
