= Geryt Potter van der Loo =

Geryt Potter van der Loo (died 10 November 1454) was a Dutch nobleman at the court of Jacqueline, Countess of Hainaut until her death in 1436, and from 24 April 1445 a councillor of the Court of Holland in The Hague. His Middle Dutch translation of Froissart's Chronicles is one of the 1000 notable works in the Canon of Dutch Literature.

Around 1440-1445, Gerrit Potter translated the first three books of the "Chroniques" by Jean Froissart into Middle Dutch. This translation, partially preserved in two manuscripts, is significant for the linguistic study of 15th-century Dutch Middle Dutch. One of the manuscripts is kept in the university library of Leiden and was partially published between 1898 and 1909 by Napoleon de Pauw. The publication selects sections that deal with the seven-year Ghent Revolt (1379-1385) against the count of Flanders, Louis of Male, and discusses the vicissitudes of popular leaders Jan Hyoens, Philip van Artevelde, and Frans Ackerman.

== Biography ==
=== Birthplace and Date ===
Gerrit Potter was likely born in 's Gravenhage or Voorburg. His father, Dirc Potter, a well-known poet and diplomat, held houses and lands there in fief. After Dirc was enfeoffed with the estate De Loo in Voorburg, he began calling himself 'Dirc Potter van der Loo' (or in French sources Thierry Potter de Loo). Gerrit was named after his grandfather, who was also a clerk in the service of the count. Little is known about Gerrit's youth and education. Since he is mentioned as the heir to Dirc's fiefs upon his father's death in 1428, he must have been of legal age at that time (which can be understood as 16 years or older). Therefore, a birth date at the end of the 14th or the first decade of the 15th century is plausible for Gerrit Potter.

His younger brother, the canon Jacob Potter van der Loo, is mentioned in the matriculation records of the University of Paris around 1425. In 1423, he was already studying in Cologne. At that time, he must have been at least 14 years old. Given their father's close involvement with the court in The Hague, it is conceivable that Jacob was named after Jacqueline of Bavaria, who was born in 1401. Jacob would later obtain a doctorate in ecclesiastical law. Gerrit does not appear in the matriculation records. He is also never referred to with the academic title 'Master' in the sources. This suggests that, unlike his brother, he did not receive a university education. The legal and financial knowledge Gerrit needed as a council member, he likely acquired on the job, in service to Jacqueline of Bavaria, as bailiff of 's-Gravenzande, as clerk of the general receiver, and as an (unsalaried) council member. He most probably gained knowledge of French (and possibly also Latin) at home. His father Dirc Potter translated works from Italian, Latin, and French.

Mentions of Gerrit Potter as the sheriff of Lymmen in 1404 and information in source material about the Arkelse Wars under Count William VI of Holland are generally considered apocryphal or as references to an older namesake.

=== Marriage and Children ===
Gerrit Potter married Kerstijne van der Mije. On January 13, 1432, she is referred to as Gerrit's wife in the arrangement of her dower. Kerstijne was the daughter of Jan van der Mije. The latter was an ardent supporter of Jacqueline of Bavaria and served simultaneously with Potter in her service. After Jacoba's death, Jan acted on behalf of Margaret of Burgundy as executor of her will (see also below: career).

This marriage produced five children:

- Dirk, married Catherine Jacob Buysers' daughter in 1461. Executed in April 1481 as a Hook rebel.
- Gerrit (died in 1485)
- Jan the Elder
- Jan the Younger
- Geertruida, married Dirk Hoogstraat in 1451.

Philip the Good exceptionally allowed that after their father's death (the income from) Gerrit's fiefs be divided among his children. Between 1476 and 1485, the sons engaged in several lawsuits against each other over their inheritance. This indicates that the family relationships were far from optimal.

Gerrit's (grand)sons remained active in local administration until the 16th century. Dirk was successively bailiff of Rijnland (from 1469) and Rotterdam (from 1479), but then sided with the Hooks in the revolt against Maximilian of Austria. One of the Jans (the Elder?) is mentioned as substitute bailiff of 's-Gravenzande (1481-1487). In 1495, a Jan Potter is still bailiff of Honderdland. In 1524, Gerrit Jansz. Potter is bailiff of Naaldwijk and Honderdland.

=== Burial Place and Date of Death ===
Gerrit Potter died on November 10, 1454. The date of death is recorded in the comital accounts and confirmed there by the auditors from the Chamber of Accounts. In the St. James Church in The Hague, there is a sand grave that, according to a grave book from 1620, belongs to "Gerrit Potter van der Loo". It is the twenty-second grave in the fourth row of the first crossing in the nave. Possibly, the translator of Froissart is buried here. Gerrit Potter may have been a member of the St. James Brotherhood, which established a perpetual office at the St. James altar in 1453. In any case, on that occasion, an annuity of 1 pound was established on Pieter Potter's house (certainly a member) and 3 pounds on Gerrit's house west of The Hague. In the same church, a memorial was held annually on November 10, his date of death. For this, the memorial masters received the annuity of six pounds established on the house 'In die Roosse' on the Plaats, which Potter had acquired in February 1439. (annuity letter: National Archive, The Hague, Kloosters Delfland: Memories etc. St. James Church The Hague, access number 3.18.34.01, inventory number 26F) If the Gerrit Potter buried in the St. James Church is indeed the same as the translator of Froissart, this is remarkable. It is rare for the burial place of a Middle Dutch author to be known.

== Career ==
=== In Service of Jacoba ===
The earliest known reference to Gerrit Potter dates from 1425 when John IV of Brabant grants him a safe-conduct through his lands. John was probably both Duke of Brabant and Count of Holland at that time. In January 1425, John of Bavaria died, who had held power in Holland until then. This was much against the will of Jacqueline of Bavaria, John's niece and the rightful successor of her father William VI. The County of Holland was going through a difficult period: after her father's death, Jacqueline hastily married her cousin John of Brabant in the hope that this marriage would give her the necessary support as countess. However, things turned out differently. In her struggle against her uncle John, who imposed himself as Ruward, Jacqueline's new husband proved too weak, and ultimately the rule over Holland was leased to John of Bavaria. Only the County of Hainaut was left to her. Disappointed in her husband and believing that the Pope would declare the bond between cousin and cousin invalid, Jacqueline married a second time, now with Humphrey of Gloucester, brother of the English crown prince. His support also proved insufficient. When the marriage between Jacqueline and John IV turned out to be valid, Humphrey even withdrew his support. Gerrit was probably already in the service of the countess in 1425. In 1428, Jacqueline enfeoffed 'our beloved Gerrit Potter van der Loo' with his father's fiefs. On January 13, 1432, possibly on the occasion of his marriage to Kerstijne van der Mije, she also granted him 15 hectares of peatland. An account from 1433-34, drawn up by Jan Ruychrock van de Werve and Jan van der Mije, Gerrit's father-in-law, shows Gerrit Potter actively serving Jacqueline, mainly as a tax collector.

=== Bailiff of 's-Gravenzande (1436-1445) ===
On October 23, 1436, barely a fortnight after Jacoba's death on October 8, 1436, Philip the Good appointed Gerrit Potter as bailiff of 's Gravenzande. He may have already held a similar position under Jacoba. In any case, he now added judicial experience to the financial expertise he had gained in Jacoba's service. Together with his language skills and the network he had built up in the service of the deceased countess, this combination ensured that he had all the assets to make a name for himself in the regional administration of Holland.

=== The Legacy of Jacoba (1436-1444) ===
On November 6, 1444, Gerrit Potter submitted the account he had drawn up for the executors of Jacoba van Beieren's will to the court. Among them were some old acquaintances: Jacoba's widower, Frank van Borssele, Count of Ostervant, and his representative Jan Ruychrock. Jan van der Mije, Gerrit's father-in-law, represented the interests of Jacoba's mother, Margaret of Burgundy. Gerrit must have known other executors in Jacoba's circles as well. Among them, for example, Gillis van Wissenkerke, councilor of Frank van Borssele and Jan van Neck, Jacoba's confessor.

Gerrit not only drew up the account: he also acted as receiver, hosted the executors (March 12, 1444), and actively participated in the sale of Jacoba's possessions. For all this, he traveled to Brabant, Artois, Flanders,..., everywhere the duke or his chancellor resided. He bought, perhaps as a memento of his deceased employer, a brooch Jacoba had received from the steward of Ponthieu. The account also mentions a donation from Kerstijne, Potter's wife, for Jacoba's soul.

=== Clerk of the General Receiver (1439-1441) ===
Gerrit's financial expertise is also evident from the fact that between 1439 and 1441, he drafted and then copied the neat versions of the accounts for the court as a clerk of the general receiver Willem III van Naaldwijk. In this role, he was regularly present at the auditing of the accounts conducted by external auditors. His language skills would have come in handy again: the audit was conducted in French.

=== Member of the Council of Holland (1438-1454) ===
From 1438, Gerrit Potter appears as a councilor in the Council of Holland, first unpaid, from April 24, 1445, with a paid seat. He continued to act as a tax collector (1439, 1451) and judicial investigator (for example, in the curious case between Attorney General Bengaert Say and President Gozewijn de Wilde, who was accused of sodomy) and was sent abroad as a negotiator (e.g., Cologne, Bremen, Bruges, Rouen, Nijmegen, Utrecht). Gerrit was closely involved in the negotiations between the Hanse and Holland following the Treaty of Copenhagen (1441). He also maintained first-line contact between local councils and regional administration as a councilor. He was often involved in calming local uprisings (including in Amsterdam in 1442). His actions in quelling the violent factional dispute between Hooks and Cods in Leiden in July 1445 were still described in the early sixteenth century "Divisiekroniek" (printed in 1517, attributed to Cornelius Aurelius).

== Bibliography/Works ==
Contrary to the title of the publication by Napoleon de Pauw, Gerrit Potter did not only translate Jean Froissart's "Chronique de Flandres" (c. 1385), but he made a translation of the first three books of his extensive chronicle about the political turmoil in Western Europe at the end of the fourteenth century. Gerrit's style resembles the jargon from accounts and legal registers and seems influenced by the terminological innovation in administrative language following the incorporation of Holland into the Burgundian personal union. Gerrit likely wrote his translation in the Council of Holland, after circa 1440. His exact goal remains unclear. He displayed his expertise and language skills with his monumental translation. He may have aimed to provide his colleagues, who were not always proficient in French, access to a rich information source on the major European conflicts in which the new Burgundian rulers of Holland often played a prominent role. The Hundred Years' War was still ongoing, and unrest was once again emerging in Flanders (in Bruges, the Ghent Revolt (1449-1453)). Additionally, Froissart's chronicle, as a collection of good and bad examples, could serve as a guide for anyone holding or aspiring to an administrative position.

The text of the translation closely follows the French text in the manuscripts Besançon BM 864-865 (Paris, book producers around Pierre de Liffol, between 1411-1418, also books I-III, in two volumes). The illustrations (which were provided) in the two Dutch manuscripts and the manuscripts from Besançon are almost identical. Such a Paris manuscript could have ended up in The Hague via Jacqueline of Bavaria, once betrothed to the French crown prince Jean de France (1398-1417), via her father William VI of Holland, who often visited Paris to manage the affairs of his future son-in-law, or via one of the supporters of Philip the Good.

The colophons in the manuscripts with the Dutch translation refer to two volumes (in French?) and four books in Dutch. This suggests that the Dutch and French versions of the "Chroniques" could be consulted side by side in the intended use environment.

The translation is (partially) preserved in two copies, both written on paper:

The Hague, Koninklijke Bibliotheek, MS 130 B 21 (only book III), illustrated. Circa 1450-60. North Holland (decoration from Haarlem?). In 1564 owned by Claes van Bronchorst, canon of the court chapel in Oostvoorne. Before circa 1666 possibly owned by Isaac Vossius. Before 1792 owned by Joachim Rendorp, mayor of Amsterdam and lord of Marquette. Purchased by the kingdom of the Netherlands from the estate of Sir Thomas Phillipps in 1888 and transferred to the Koninklijke Bibliotheek in The Hague in 1889. Leiden, University Library, MSS BPL 3, I & II (book II and book III), with space for illustration not executed. Two copyists worked on this copy, completed on January 26, 1470, by the Leiden cloth merchant/council member/mayor Jan Hendriksz. Paeds. Acquired by Leiden University Library between 1623 and 1640. There must have once been a complete luxury set, consisting of three parts copied on parchment:

A parchment manuscript, consisting of three parts, is mentioned in two inventories of Batestein Castle (Vianen). The first inventory was drawn up in 1556 after the death of Reinoud III van Brederode, the second eleven years later in 1567, after Reinoud's son, Hendrik van Brederode (1531-1568) 'the Great Geus' fled Batestein. So far, there is no trace of this copy. The translation probably never had widespread distribution. At the beginning of the sixteenth century, historian Jan van Naaldwijk, a grandson of Willem III van Naaldwijk, seems unaware of Gerrit Potter's Froissart translation.

Napoleon de Pauw published a partial printed edition of Book II. His selection is limited to the chapters about Flanders:

Napoleon de Pauw, Jehan Froissart's Cronyke van Vlaenderen translated from French into Dutch by Gerijt Potter vander Loo, in the 15th century published, Ghent, A. Siffer, 1898-1909, 4 volumes (5 books) (based on manuscript BPL 3, I in Leiden)

== Sources ==
Schoenaers, D (2010) Translated from French into Dutch in Holland in the 15th century. The case of Gerard Potter's Middle Dutch translation of Froissart's 'Chroniques'. [Phd-thesis]
