= Joos Lambrecht =

Dutch typographer and printer

Joos Lambrecht (1491, Ghent – 1556/7, Wesel) was a Walloon printer, typographer, lexicographer and linguist.

He was the son of Jan Lambrecht and came from a family of engravers of seals and marks used to authenticate cloth made in Ghent.

== Career ==
Lambrecht worked in Ghent as a printer and cutter of printing type during the middle decades of the sixteenth century. He described himself in the colophons of his books with titles such as lettersteker and typoglyphus, terms associated with the cutting of printing letters.

In 1539 Lambrecht introduced the use of roman type in Ghent and also experimented with early italic type styles in some of his publications.

Records from 1548 show Lambrecht entering into a contract to supply new fonts of type to the Ghent printer Cornelius Manillus.

He was a schoolmaster at the Walloon School and also wrote poetry. His work as a printer is regarded as having particularly good quality.

After nearly two decades of activity in Ghent, he sold his printing office and type foundry in 1553.

== Works ==
=== Dictionary ===
Lambrecht's Naembouck van alle natuerlicken ende ongheschuumde Vlaemsche woorden, printed in Ghent in 1546, is regarded as an important early contribution to the study of the Dutch language.

The work is a Dutch–French dictionary that lists Dutch words alphabetically and gives their French equivalents, reflecting Lambrecht's work as a teacher of French at the Walloon School. It also served as a learning tool, presenting vocabulary in a structured way and drawing attention to spelling and pronunciation. It has been described as part of a broader sixteenth-century development in which language was increasingly treated as an object of study.
