= Rhijnvis Feith =

Dutch novelist (1753–1824)

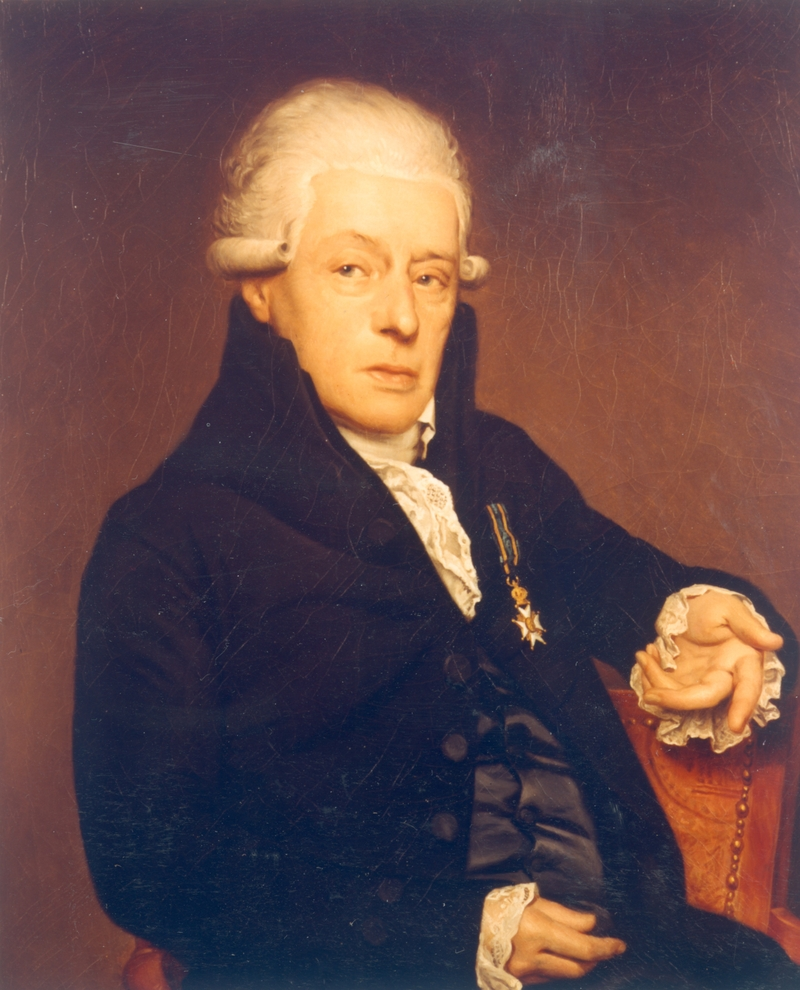
Portrait by Willem Bartel van der Kooi, 1819

Jhr. Rhijnvis Feith (christened 9 February 1753 in Zwolle – 8 February 1824 in Zwolle) was a Dutch poet.

== Biography ==
Feith was born into an aristocratic family in Zwolle, the capital of the province Overijssel as the only son of Pieter Feith and Elsabe Spaar. He was christened on 9 Feb 1753. He was educated at Harderwijk and studied law at the university of Leiden (1769-1770), where he took his degree after only one year. He married Ockje Groeneveld in Weener, Germany, in Nov 1772 and settled in his birthplace. In the period Sep 1773 through to Jan 1790 they had at least 10 children, all christened in Zwolle. In 1780 Rhijnvis Feith became burgomaster of Zwolle.

He built a luxurious villa, which he named Boschwijk, in Zalné in Zwollerkerspel, the outskirts of Zwolle, and there he lived in the greatest comfort. His first important production was Julia, in 1783, a novel written in emulation of Werther, and steeped in Weltschmerz and despair. This was followed by the tragedy of Thirsci (1784); Ferdinand and Constantia (1785), another Werther novel; and The Patriots (1784), a tragedy. Bilderdijk and other writers attacked his morbid melancholy, and Johannes Kinker (1764–1845) parodied his novels, but his vogue continued. In 1791 he published a tragedy of Lady Jane Grey; in 1792 a didactic poem, The Grave (Dutch: Het Graf), in four cantos; in 1793 Inez de Castro; in 1796 to 1814 five volumes of Odes and Miscellaneous Poems; and in 1802 Old Age (Dutch: De Ouderdom), in six cantos. He wrote Letters to Sophia on Kant's Philosophy, a poetical work, in 1805. In 1808 he became member of the Royal Institute. His Letters on Different Subjects of Literature of 1784 was a noted piece of literary criticism. He died in Zwolle in 1824.

His works were collected (Rotterdam, 11 vols.) in 1824, with a biographical notice by N. G. van Kampen. Though now neglected, he is interesting as the Dutch representative of the mood that in Germany produced Novalis.

Feith's coat of arms

== Honorary awards ==
- Prizes awarded by the Leiden Poet's society Dichtlievend Genootschap:
  - Gold medal for the poem Heil van den Vrede, 1779
  - Gold medal for the poem Verhandeling over het Heldendicht, 1781
  - Gold and silver medals for the poems Den lof van De Ruijter, 1785
- Zilveren penning van het genootschap Studium Scientiarum Genitris in Rotterdam voor het gedicht De Menschlievendheid, 1780
- Gold medal by the Zwolle society Kunstliefde spaart geen vlijt for the poem Karel V aan zijnen zoon Philips II, bij de overdragt van de regering der Nederlanden, 1782
- Silver medal from Teylers Eerste Genootschap in 1797
- Gold medal from Teylers Eerste Genootschap in 1801
- Silver medal from the society Ter verdediging van den Christelijken Godsdienst, 1800
- Ridder in de orde van de Nederlandse Leeuw, February 20, 1816
