= Jozef Simons =

Flemish writer and poet

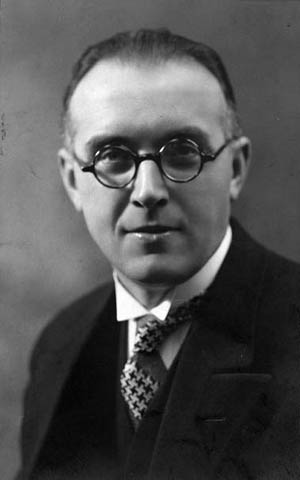
Jozef Simons

Jozef Simons (21 May 1888, in Oelegem – 20 January 1948, in Turnhout) was a Flemish writer and poet. Jozef Simons was active in the socio-cultural life of the Campine, among other things as a President of the Association of Campine writers (1937–1948). Together with Felix Timmermans, Ernest Claes and the poet Jozef De Voght he was one the writers of the Belgian Campine during the interbellum.

Jozef Simons was born in the Kerkstraat 18 in Oelegem as a son of Louis Simons and Maria Pauline Verheyen. After graduating in commercial sciences at the Institut Supérieur de Commerce Saint-Ignace in Antwerp, Simons became from 1909 up to 1923 house teacher of Count Brouchoven de Bergeyck in Beveren-Waas. During World War I, from 1916 and until 1919 he served as a soldier, first as a gunner, afterwards as interpreter for the British army. On 8 May 1920 he married Maria Engels, and lived in Schilde. When Count Jozef de Brouchoven de Bergeyck died in 1922, he lost his position as a house teacher. From 1 December 1923 up to 1932 he worked as an editor for the Belgian Farmer Association (Boerenbond) and moved to Leuven. He graduated in 1927 with a Master's degree in archaeology and art history at the Catholic University of Leuven. From 1932 onwards until his death in 1948, he worked as publisher, editor and general factotum at the N.V J. van Mierlo-Proost in Turnhout. During the interbellum, between World War I and World War II, Simons built a reputation as an author of travel tales, tales concerning the Campine: Harslucht, (E: Resin air) 1933, short stories De laatste fles (The last bottle), 1930 and novels Dientje Goris, 1935, and as a translator from English, Spanish, and German. He also wrote many song texts, for composers such as Lodewijk de Vocht, Flor Peeters and Armand Preud'homme.

The most important work of Jozef Simons was Eer Vlaanderen vergaat (E: Before Flanders perishes), 1927, a romantic history of the Frontbeweging (front movement). The first edition appeared under the pseudonym Ivo Draulans.

== Sources ==
- Marcel Verheecke, Jozef Simons, verteller, zanger, Kempenaar, 1963
- Henri Floris Jespers, Eer Vlaanderen vergaat, Jozef Simons (1888–1948), 1988
- Gaston Durnez, Denkend aan Jozef Simons: Een goede kracht in het hart van het volk, 1993
