= Joris van den Bergh =

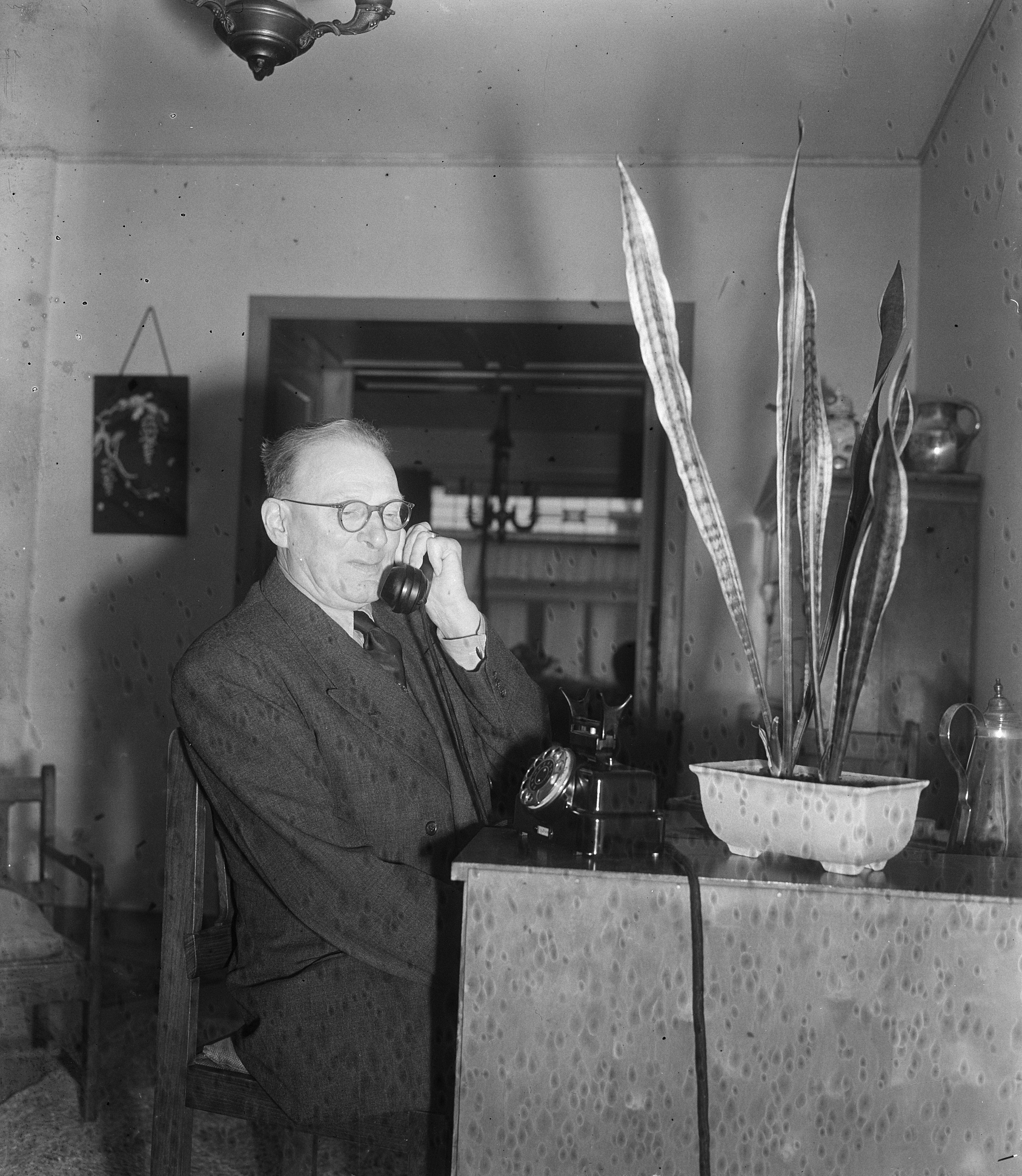
Joris van den Berg at the age of 70

Johannes Antonius Arnoldus 'Joris' van den Bergh (17 February 1882 in Utrecht – 1 July 1953 in the Hague) was a Dutch author and journalist. He is considered a pioneer of Dutch sports journalism.

== Biography ==
He was a versatile athlete; He did speed skating, football and billiards. His greatest passion, however, was cycling. Up to the age of 40 he was an employee at the Nederlandse Spoorwegen, he wrote sports articles for a number of daily and weekly newspapers, but from the turn of the century he spent his spare time writing about the sports that he exerted. From the early 1920s he worked full-time as a journalist and was the Hague sports correspondent for several magazines and newspapers, including "Sports", "Sports World", "Sporty" and "Panorama", for many years. His articles were of a biting style.

In 1928, he wrote the book "De Wielersport begint" (The Cycling Begins), which portrays the beginnings of racing in the Netherlands. In the following year he wrote "Te midden der kampioenen" (Among the Champions) about the multiple world champion Piet Moeskops and his special discipline Sprint (cycling). In 1941 he published the Sports Psychology works "Werk Mysterieuze Krachten in de Sport" (Mysterious Forces at Work in Sport). He noted that "the muscles that provide the power, have no value without the will of the spirit". the latter two books are considered classics of cycling literature and are still widely read today.

It was due to Van den Bergh's initiative, that in 1936 the first four-piece Dutch national team appeared at the 1936 Tour de France. They were helped by having the support of his Flemish colleague Karel Van Wijnendaele, and the failure of the Italian driver because of the Second Italo-Abyssinian War. As the driver Theo Middelkamp said to Van den Bergh: "But Joris, I have never seen a mountain." Mahi started and won a heavy mountain stage and finished 23rd overall. Van den Bergh himself however didn't go to France, but instead focused on reporting the event from home, on the basis of articles in other Belgian newspapers, telex and telephone conversations with the racers. Van den Bergh went to the 1939 Tour de France, 1948 Tour de France and 1949 Tour de France acting as the team leader at the tours. In 1939 he was driven there by his Chauffeur.

Van den Bergh's real love however was track cycling, and his affinity and knowledge of road cycling were significantly lower. From this period dates the anecdote that Van den Bergh thought cyclists have it easier than their companions in the hot, narrow cars where they couldn't feel the cooling wind. Also he fell victim to the miscalculation, that the Italian racer Fausto Coppi was nothing more than "een mannetje met een tip bristle" ("a male with a chicken breast").

In the 1930s, Van den Bergh took the view that a Europe under German leadership was "not a bad idea" which caused bad blood among his colleagues. Also in August 1942 he took part in the NSB a meeting about Nazi occupation of the Netherlands. Sports journalists gathered in Valkenburg and praised this meeting in the magazine "De Nederlandsche Journalist" (The Dutch Journalist) as a "historic moment". His enthusiasm was based on a speech by the Secretary of State for education and arts, Tobie Goedewaagen, which had highlighted the importance of sports journalism. In 1944 however he published the brochure "De post in de vloeiweide" (The post in the rolling meadow). In it he described the attack by "rogue of the SS" on a radio station for Dutch resistance near Breda, where nine Dutch people including one child were killed, and eight more people were executed the next day. Van den Bergh, knew some of the people that were killed, and made it no secret that he now hated the Germans.

Another passion of Van den Bergh was the Utrecht family circus "Circus Van Bever" (Valentine Circus), he spent a lot of time with them and wrote a book about it in 1946.

On 1 July 1953, he died of a heart attack. In one of his last articles about cycling, he condemned doping and conspiracy writing: "As long as the deceiver is deceived, the desire to win prevails." Four weeks after his death, on 28 July 1953, the Dutch national team were victorious at the 1953 Tour de France, they were solemnly received by 35,000 spectators at the Olympic Stadium (Amsterdam). Thousands of people stood up for two minutes silence in commemoration of Van den Burgh.

== Publications ==
- "De wielersport starts". 1928
- Te Midden of Kampioenen. 1929
- Mysterieuze crashed in de sport. With an afterword by Karel Lotsy. 1941 (on German: "mysterious forces in the sport.) The secrets of mental training ". From the Dutch. by Christoph Bönig. Covadonga Verlag 2010, ISBN 978-3-936973-43-3)
- "The post in the rolling meadow". Breda 1944 (Zusammenfassung: "the Post in the Rolling meadow (summary of a report by Joris van den Bergh)". hhbest.nl.)
- "The circus draws". Amsterdam 1946

== Literature ==
- Ron Couwenhoven: "Surrounded fifty years of champions. Life and work of Joris van den Bergh". The outside players 2010, ISBN 978-9071359231 (English)
