= Aarnout Drost =

Dutch poet and writer (1810–1834)

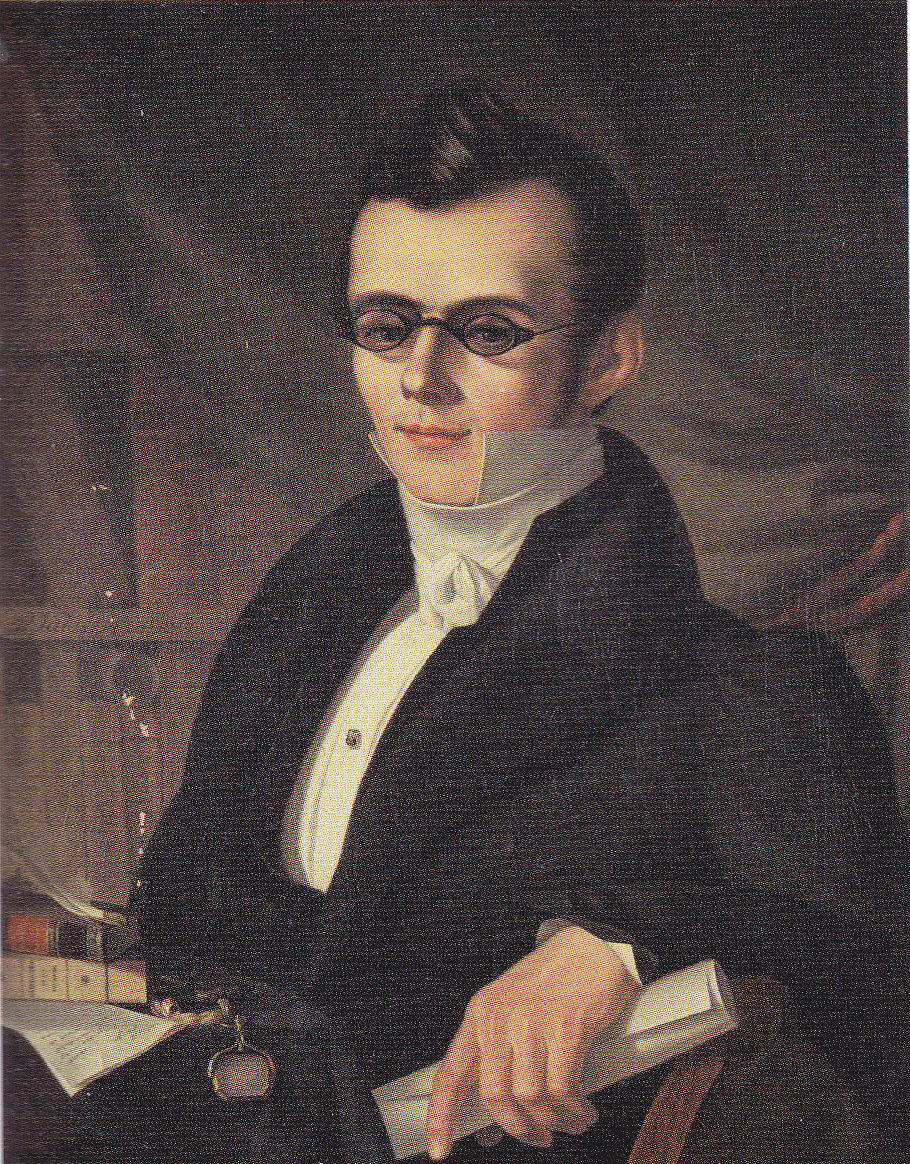
- Portrait of Aarnout Drost by Petrus Kiers
- Born: 15 March 1810; Amsterdam, Netherlands
- Died: 5 November 1834 (aged 24); Amsterdam, Netherlands
- Education: Leiden University
- Occupations: Poet, prose writer
- Writing career
- Language: Dutch
- Notable work: Hermingard van de Eikenterpen

Aarnout Drost (15 March 1810 – 5 November 1834) was a Dutch poet and prose writer. Aarnout Drost was born in Amsterdam and died there of tuberculosis at the age of 24.

== Life ==
Aarnout Drost studied theology at the Athenaeum Illustre in Amsterdam, where he attended lectures by the classical scholar David Jacob van Lennep. Between 1829 and 1833, he continued his studies at Leiden University.

In 1834, Drost founded the literary magazine De Muzen together with R.C. Bakhuizen van den Brink, E.J. Potgieter, and J.P. Heije. Only six issues were published, containing poems and literary criticism. The magazine was a predecessor of De Gids. Drost also served as an editor of Vriend des Vaderlands together with Heije.

Because of his early death, Drost was unable to fulfill his literary potential, but his novel Hermingard van de Eikenterpen. Een oud vaderlands verhaal, set in the fourth century AD, has led him to be regarded as one of the forerunners of Dutch Romanticism. He wrote the historical novel as a 22-year-old student, drawing inspiration from Walter Scott and particularly from Les Martyrs ou le triomphe de la religion chrétienne (1809) by François-René de Chateaubriand.
