= Digital Library for Dutch Literature =

Website about Dutch language and literature

- Available in: Dutch
- Owner: Maatschappij der Nederlandse Letterkunde
- Website: www.dbnl.org
- Launched: 1999
- Current status: Online

The Digital Library for Dutch Literature (Dutch: Digitale Bibliotheek voor de Nederlandse Letteren [ˌdiɣiˈtaːlə ˌbiblijoːˈteːk voːr də ˈneːdərlɑntsə ˈlɛtərə(n)] or DBNL [deːbeːʔɛnˈɛl]) is a website (showing the abbreviation as dbnl) that provides access to key texts related to the Dutch language, Dutch literature, and the culture of Dutch-speaking countries and regions. It contains thousands of literary texts, secondary literature, and additional information, such as biographies, portraits, and hyperlinks.

== Funding and structure ==
The DBNL was launched on 6 July 1999 by the Society of Dutch Literature (Dutch: Maatschappij der Nederlandse Letterkunde), which established the DBNL Foundation to manage it. At an early stage, members of the society were polled to establish a list of the authors and works to be given priority, resulting in a provisional Canon of Dutch Literature, a list that was published in 2002.

Development of the DBNL was made possible by subsidies from, among others, the Dutch Organization for Scientific Research and the Dutch Language Union. In 2008, René van Stipriaan was appointed as editor in chief, and the work was done by eight employees in Leiden, 20 students, and 50 people in the Philippines who scanned and typed the texts.

Stipriaan resigned as editor in 2012, and since 2013, coordination has been from The Hague rather than Leiden.

As of 2020, the library is being maintained by a collaboration of the Dutch Language Union, the Flanders Heritage Library, and the Royal Library of the Netherlands.

== Basic library: 1,000 key texts ==
The DBNL provides the Basic Library of Dutch Literature, containing 1,000 works of fundamental importance to Dutch and Flemish cultural history. The chairperson of the committee that selected the 1,000 key texts was Paul Schnabel. Nevertheless, some classic texts of Dutch literature, like Gerard Reve's 1947 novel The Evenings (Dutch: De avonden) and Willem Frederik Hermans' 1966 novel Beyond Sleep (Dutch: Nooit meer slapen) are absent for copyright reasons.
