= Dirc van Delf =

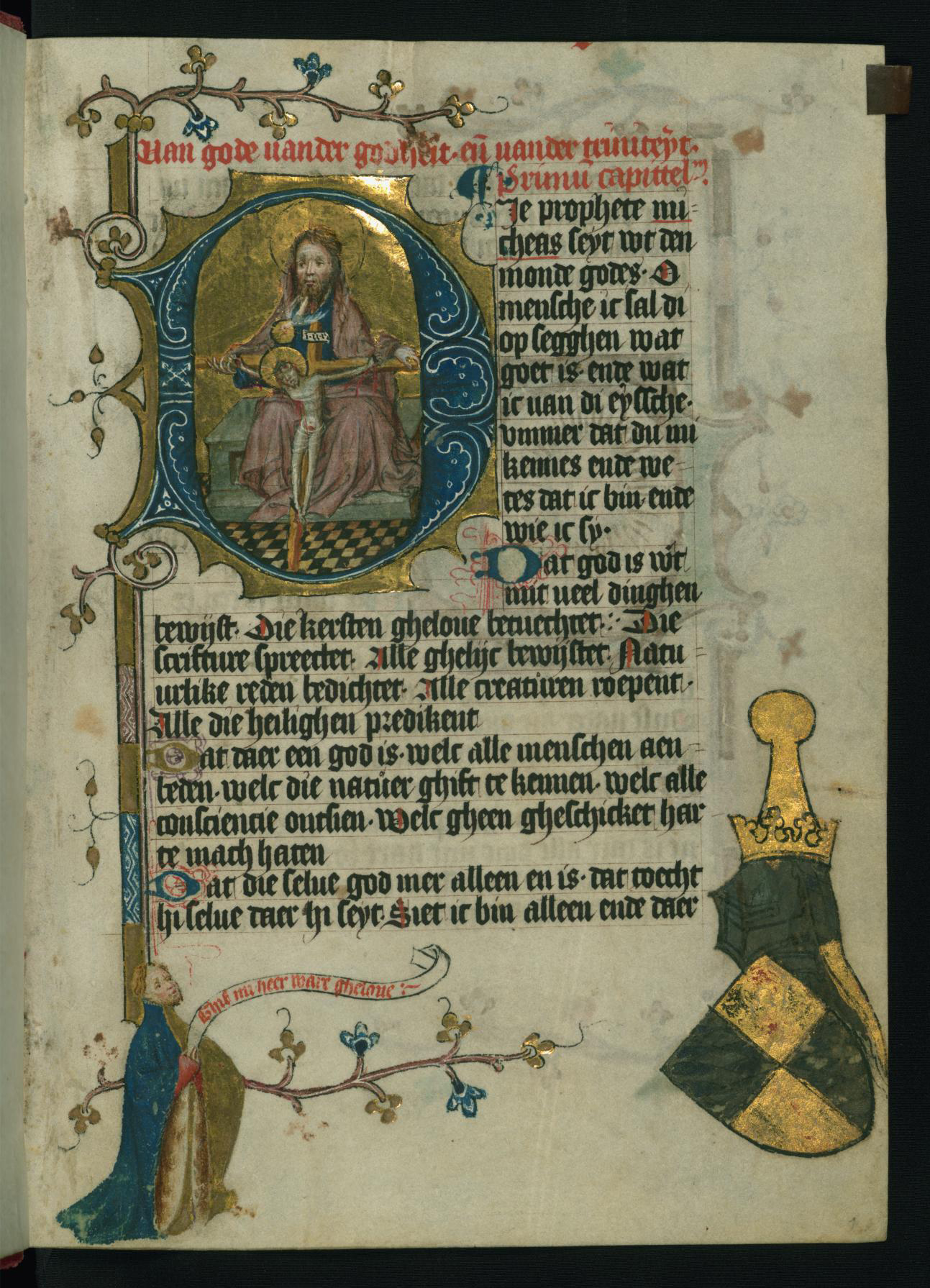
Dedication copy of Dirc's Tafel depicting Duke Albert in the lower left. In the historiated initial is the Trinity.

Dirc van Delf, sometimes anglicized Dirk of Delft (fl. c. 1365 – c. 1404), was a Dutch Dominican theologian.

Dirc was probably born at Delft in the County of Holland around 1365 and education from youth by the Dominicans in Utrecht. He earned a doctorate of theology. On 17 December 1391, he was hired as a chaplain at the court of Albert I, Duke of Bavaria and Count of Holland, in The Hague. He was a lecturer (magister) and regent (regens) of the universities of Erfurt and (from 1403) Cologne. The last record of a payment to Dirc from the duke is dated July 1404, and he was certainly not kept on after Albert's death in December 1404.

One of the most learned men of his time, Dirc wrote at least two books. The first, completed by 1401, is now lost. It was dedicated to Albert's wife, Margaret of Cleves, and is known only from a reference in the ducal accounts. The second, the Tafel van den Kersten Ghelove (Handbook of the Christian Faith), was begun around 1403 for Albert. It is an encyclopedia of scholastic theology written for a lay audience in the local vernacular, Middle Dutch. Its prose style is highly regarded. Two partial contemporary illuminated manuscripts made for Albert survive: Baltimore, Walters Art Gallery, MS W.171 and New York, Pierpont Morgan Library, MS M.691.

Dirc's main sources were Latin, the most important being Hugh Ripelin's 13th-century Compendium theologicae veritatis. The Tafel is divided into two parts: the Winterstuc (Winter Part) and the Somerstuc (Summer Part). The first concerns the Trinity, angelology, anthropology, demonology, hamartiology and the birth and ministry of Jesus. The second concerns the passion of Jesus, the hierarchy of angels, the works of mercy, the sacraments, the Antichrist, the four last things and Heaven. Between the sections on the sacraments is a hodge-podge of less theological topics. These include chapters on pagan virtues; on saint's lives taken from the Vitae Patrum (in Dutch, Vaderboec); on the election and coronation of the Holy Roman Emperor; on chess; on the Queen of Sheba. A morgenspraec (morning conversation) between Jesus and a sinner ends this section and leads into the section on the Antichrist.

== See also ==
- Masters of Dirc van Delf

== Bibliography ==
- Faems, An (2001). "Dirc van Delf (ca. 1365–ca. 1404)". In John M. Jeep (ed.). Medieval Germany: An Encyclopedia. New York and London: Garland. pp. 169–170.
- Lievens, Robrecht (2012). "The 'Pagan' Dirc van Delf". In C. G. Steel; J. Marenbon; W. Verbeke (eds.). Paganism in the Middle Ages: Threat and Fascination. Leuven University Press. pp. 167–194.
- van Oostrom, Frits Pieter (1992). Court and Culture: Dutch Literature, 1350–1450. University of California Press.
