= Elisabeth Maria Post =

Dutch poet and writer (1755–1812)

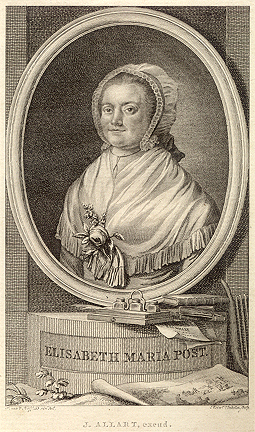
- Engraved portrait by Reinier Vinkeles for the novel Reinhart (1791–1792), after a drawing by Isaac van 't Hoff
- Born: 22 November 1755; Utrecht, Dutch Republic
- Died: 3 July 1812 (aged 56); Epe, French Empire
- Occupations: writer; poet; novelist
- Spouse: Justus Lodewijk Overdorp (m. 1794)
- Writing career
- Genre: Sensibility

Elisabeth Maria Overdorp (née Post; 22 November 1755, Utrecht – 3 July 1812, Epe) was a Dutch poet and prose writer, and is esteemed as the foremost female representative of sensibility in Dutch literature. She is also credited as the first Dutch woman writer to speak out against slavery.

== Life ==
=== Early life ===
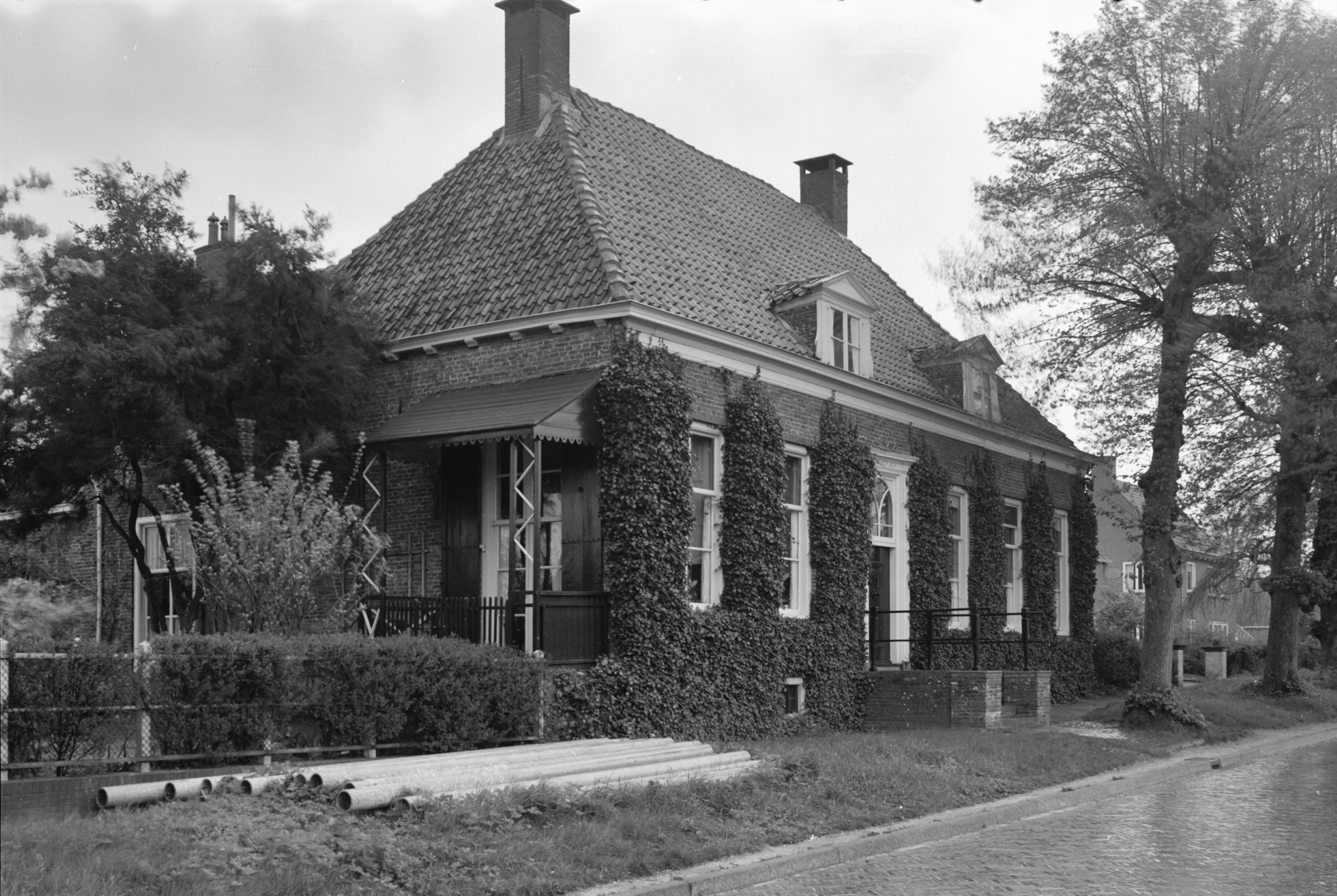
Drostehuis, Amerongen (1962)

Elisabeth Maria, daughter of Evert Post (1719–1787), owner of a sugar factory, and Johanna Maria van Romondt (1724–1792), was the sixth child in the Post family, and initially grew up in Utrecht, where her father held various administrative positions. When his sugar factory went bankrupt in 1768 – Elisabeth was twelve – the family was forced to withdraw from the genteel society of the city and moved to Emminkhuizen (below Renswoude). There the family lived in worrisome circumstances. Elisabeth spent six gloomy years there, with reading as her only recreation. In these years, her eldest and her youngest brother both died. A few autobiographical retrospectives, mainly in Voor eenzamen (1789), show that her tendency towards solitary and melancholy existence and her awareness of the transience of power and prestige developed mainly in that Emminkhuizen period.

Elisabeth was around eighteen when circumstances changed for the better: her father became a drost, schout, watergraaf, and tijnsmeester of the Heerlijkheid of Amerongen (1774), and the family moved into the distinguished Drostehuis residence there. During her walks, she got to know the Utrechtse Heuvelrug and the floodplains of the Rhine. The nature and landscape of her debut novel Het land, in brieven (1788) are those of the area around Amerongen. The family also improved financially: one of her brothers, Hermanus Hillebertus (1763–1809), left for Guyana to make a fortune there. He became the owner of several plantations. Another brother, Evert Johan (1757–1823), went on to study theology.

=== Arnhem ===
After the death of father Post (1787), Elisabeth, her mother and her two sisters, Adriana Maria (1746–1831) and Didrika Johanna (1764–1841), moved to Arnhem, where Evert Johan had become a minister. They moved in with him at the rectory. Elisabeth had dreaded the move, because she feared that she would lose her creativity in the bustle of the city. In reality, she became very productive in Arnhem, stimulated by her brother's literary circle of preachers, where Ahasuerus van den Berg, psalmist and author of edifying children's literature, set himself up as her mentor. Under his care, she anonymously published her novel Het land ("The Country", 1788). Van Den Berg wrote a commission for it in the form of a letter to the Barneveld poet Margriet van Essen (née van Haeften), in which he describes Post as having spent her years of life in rural silence "with the greatest zeal, in civilizing her mind, and in accumulating necessary, useful, and pleasant arts". He also nominated Post as an honorary member of the Hague poetry society Kunstliefde Spaart Geen Vlijt (KSGV). However, she never became a true poet; she had neither knowledge of nor affinity with the classical rules of art. Her poetry therefore often does not conform to those rules: her best poems are wholly or partly rhymeless and in a different metre than the obligatory iamb. Precisely because of her lack of education, she was able to be original: Post was the first author in Dutch literature to describe nature not according to literary conventions, but as she herself perceived it.

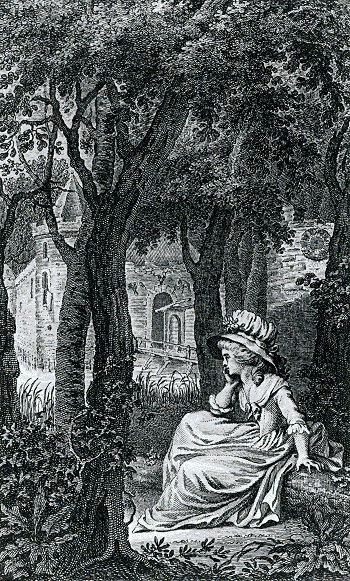
Engraved illustration for "De bouval: aan Eucrates", Voor eenzamen (1789)

In addition to Het land, in brieven, Post published a collection of poems and prose fragments Voor eenzaamen (1789) during her Arnhem years, she wrote her second epistolary novel, Reinhart, of Natuur en godsdienst ("Pure-of-Heart: or Nature and Religion", three volumes, 1791–1792), and translated Friedrich von Schiller's Don Carlos (1789). All these works, with engravings by Reinier Vinkeles, were published by Johannes Allart in Amsterdam. For the Reinhart edition, Isaac van 't Hoff also drew a portrait of Post, who, however, thought it radiated too much "surly pride". An acquaintance of Post described her as a woman of "clear, tidy and very healthy countenance", a shrewd look, "open and gentle", but also "ardent and energetic of nature": her clear mind and "practised godliness preserved her from the mistakes usually peculiar to such characters".

The main character of Het land is Emilia, an independent young woman, having lost her fiancé, who, averse to social conventions, tries to live her own life on the land. She befriends Eufrozyne, who lives in the city. This friendship of souls keeps them both on the narrow path of virtue: after all, the women want to see each other again in the hereafter and remain united. Emilia interprets the transition from day to night to day as the transition from life to death and from there to eternal life. The seasons symbolise the phases in human life: after the dead winter comes the spring of eternal life. This debut novel was a success: two more editions were published the same year, the fourth in 1794.

In Voor eenzaamen, Post breaks through the traditional pastoral illusion that shepherds are gallant philosophers: her Veluwe shepherd is a pitifully obtuse human being, but nevertheless a creature of God. In the prose fragment "De hoop", Post gives spectacular afterlife fantasies: the deceased person can travel through creation as a spiritual body at the speed of light, and will encounter higher life forms on other heavenly bodies. Finally, Post's epistolary novel Reinhart is based on the letters of her brother Hermanus Hillebertus from Guyana, although Post herself denied that it was a biographical account. The exotic setting offered a strong opportunity for the exercise of literary sensibility and for moralising commentary on the eternal destiny of human beings and the certainty of the Christian afterlife. The novel is the first Dutch fictional account of life in the Dutch West Indies, and Post is one of the few Dutch authors of the time who discusses both the degrading and unchristian nature of slavery and the virtuous and natural life of the Indians. Reinhart's accounts of the native Indians and the African slaves reflect the intellectual conflict between the Enlightenment noble savage motif and the realities of slavery. Post shows how a fundamental opponent of slavery can become tolerant of the practice for economic reasons, albeit as a good master who treats his slaves humanely. The novel was reprinted (1798), and published in German translation in 1799–1800.

=== Velp ===
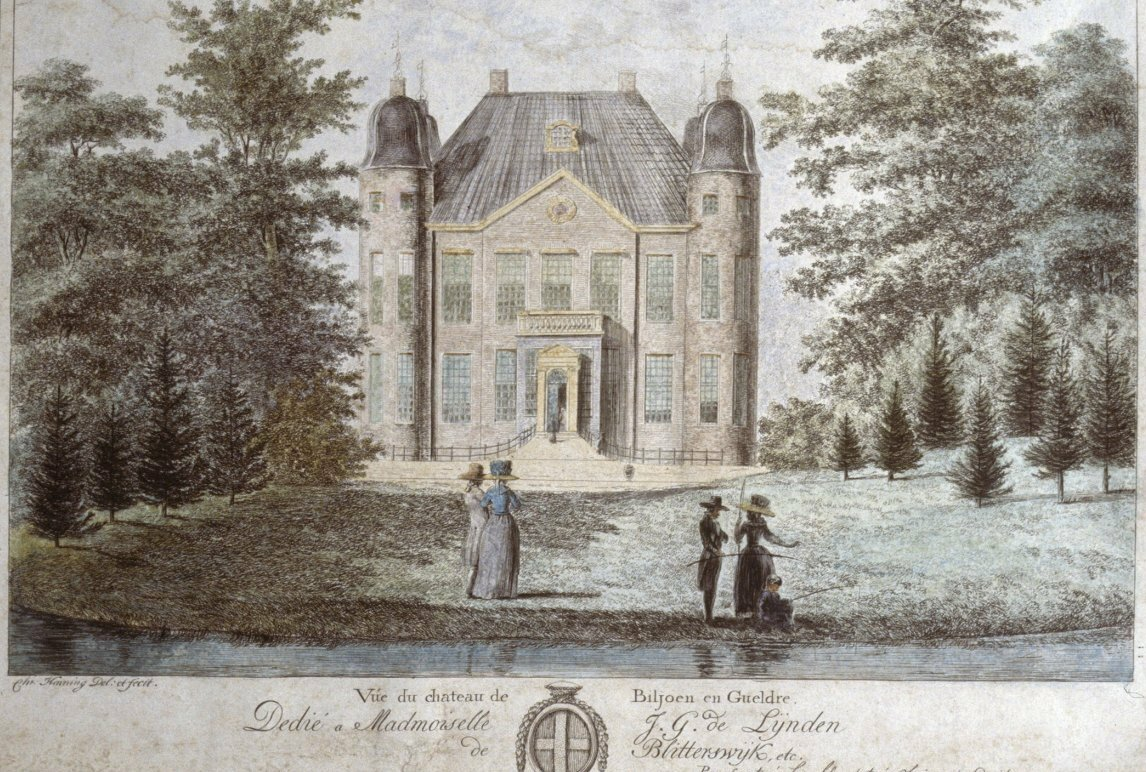
Vúe du Chateau de Biljoen en Gueldre, engraving by Christiaan Henning (18th century)

After the death of her mother in 1792, Elisabeth Post moved with her eldest sister Adriana Maria to Velp, between the floodplains and Veluwezoom. They called their house on the Arnhemseweg their "Retraite". Post became friends with the owner of Castle Biljoen and the Beekhuizen estate, Johan Frederik Willem, Baron van Spaen, and with his sister and daughters. The Post sisters were given unlimited access to Beekhuizen and the key to one of the "hutten" in the landscape park for reading and writing. Elisabeth Post also made friends with Charlotte Louise van der Capellen, who lived at Boedelhof (near Warnsveld). In her poems from this period, she sings about the landscaped parks at Rozendaal Castle and Biljoen Castle, and the Beekhuizen estate.

In 1794, at the age of thirty-nine, Elisabeth Post met Justus Lodewijk Overdorp (1763–1844), a pastor in the seaside village of Noordwijk-Binnen, who was eight years her junior. She fell in love with him, but also realised that when she married she would have to exchange her free Veluwe country life for a regular life in a Dutch rectory. She wrote candidly about her changing moods as a result of her inner struggle about the choice between her beloved nature and her beloved Overdorp. Elisabeth married Overdorp on 23 July 1794 in Velp. The poems and songs, published as Gezangen der Liefde ("Songs of Love", 1794), were regarded by a reviewer of the Vaderlandsche Letter-Oefeningen as being very bold for a woman: they were unusually direct in the candour with which they expressed her love for her husband, and Post was charged with a breach of decorum. A woman's public admission of love, however chaste, apparently constituted a transgression of contemporary convention. Post herself predicted that city-bred women who had "learned to pretend" would strongly disapprove of her freer and more natural stance.

=== Noordwijk ===
The Noordwijk years were a low point in Post's existence. That was not due to her relationship with Justus Overdorp, which she even called idyllic. She performed her duties as a preacher's wife, but the local nature did not inspire her to write and her marriage remained childless. She suffered from asthma and had deep depressions: she became weak and people sometimes feared for her life. Overdorp encouraged her to pick up the pen again.

As a pastor's wife, Post apparently could not or did not want to argue for an independent woman's life as she had done before. In that respect she differed from Elisabeth Bekker, who had not been influenced by her marriage to the much older clergyman Adriaan Wolff. In her collection of essays, Het waare genot des levens, in brieven (1796), Post describes woman primarily as a wife, mother and educator. It is striking that in the last letter of the collection, "Over de Zijpenberg", she turns away from the artificial nature of the English garden that she had sung about in Velp, and prefers the – romantically tinted – completely free and sometimes ferocious nature. In these years she also performed translation work again: Tafereelen uit het huiselijk leven (1803–1804) after G. W. Starke, the Werken (1804) by the Swiss S. Gessner, and Frederica Weisz en haare dochters (1806) after C. Garve. Other translations from the German are sometimes attributed to Post.

The winter of 1806/1807 was especially difficult for Post. She hoped that her husband would be employed in Gelderland, because otherwise she feared that she would not live long. In those months she wrote poems and songs almost as therapy, about her condition, most melancholy and religious in nature and fraught with feelings of guilt about her lack of faith in God. Yet she still wrote a single cheerful, modern-sounding nature, "Het dorpje", and in "Elegie" she expresses the hope of being able to exchange the barren coastal area for the "earthly heaven in the beautiful Gelderland" in the expectation that she will then "be healthy, happy, and become as before". The poems were collected under the title Ontwaakte zang-lust (1807).

=== Epe ===
In 1807, Overdorp was moved to Epe in the Noord Veluwe ministry. For Post, a "hermit's house" was built as an office in the garden of the rectory. She was feeling a bit better and she went on trips in the area. She made friends with the patriotic former mayor of Elburg, the widower Jan Hendrik Rauwenhoff, and his daughter Anna Wilhelmina, who lived on the Tongeren estate. She also started writing again, but more than one title is unknown: Ter gedachtenis van mijnen waardigen broeder H.H. Post, in 1809 te Demerari overleden (1810). Her health quickly deteriorated after that and medical treatment was to no avail. On 3 July 1812, Elisabeth Post died, aged fifty-six, after a long illness. A few days later, she was the first and only non-family member to be buried in the nature cemetery of the Rauwenhoffs, "in God's beautiful free creation", in accordance with her last wish.

The death of Elisabeth Maria Post went relatively unnoticed. In The Hague poetry society, which had actually been alien to her, she was commemorated by the chairman: "De gaê van Overdorp, de schrijfster van Het Land,/ Wier geest en citertoon zo velen kon bekoren,/ verwisselde van stand!/ Zij voor de Hemel lang gevormd door lichaamslijden,/ de onsterfelijke Post,/ mag nu, als engel, zich natuurbespiegeling wijden,/ van 't logge stof verlost."

== Legacy ==
A century after her death, the Epe pastor J. A. Prins campaigned to erect a monument to Elisabeth Post. The ceramist and potter W. C. Brouwer made a large stone urn in her memory, which stood on the church square in Epe for many years, but now has a place in the Reformed church. Post's grave on the Tongeren estate is still regularly visited by literary enthusiasts. Her work, which fell into oblivion after her death, has regained some interest, especially since the second half of the twentieth century. Feminist and colonial studies have contributed to the revival of interest in her work.
