= Jac. van Ginneken =

Dutch Jesuit and linguist (1877–1945)

Jac. van Ginneken SJ
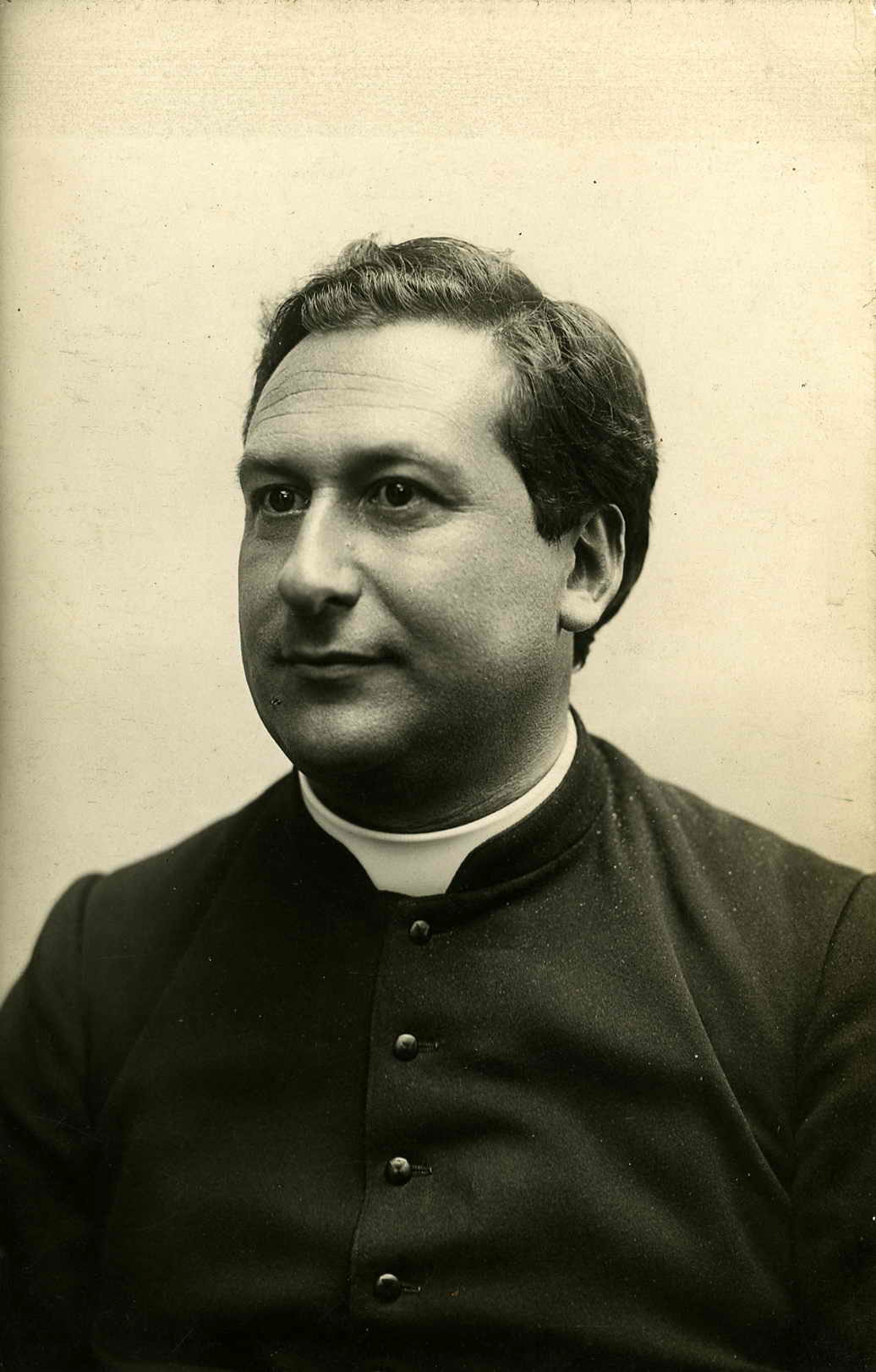
- Van Ginneken, c. 1906

Personal life
- Born: 21 April 1877 Oudenbosch, Netherlands
- Died: 22 October 1945 (aged 68) Nijmegen, Netherlands
- Education: University of Amsterdam

Religious life
- Religion: Catholicism

Jacobus Joannes Antonius van Ginneken SJ (21 April 1877 – 22 October 1945) was a Dutch linguist and Jesuit, who was a professor at the Katholieke Universiteit Nijmegen since its start in 1923. He taught Dutch language, Dutch literature, comparative linguistics of the Indo-European languages, and Sanskrit.

== Ideas ==
Starting with his Grondbeginselen van de psychologische taalwetenschap ('Fundamentals of Psychological Linguistics') based on which he wrote his dissertation Principes de linguistique psychologique, Van Ginneken worked on developing a psychological foundation for linguistics and language. Three substantial parts of his convictions are presented in the following:

First, Van Ginneken opposed the prevalence of the neogrammarians' methods in linguistics and was a proponent for a psychological approach to linguistics in a more synchronic way, thereby allowing, he thought, to gain an extended view of the diachronic development of language as well.

Second, language, it seemed to him, had its foundations in sub- or unconscious regions of sentiment and emotion. This notion, which he explained in his Principes, had its opposition in the field of language psychology from those who saw language as prevailingly cognitive, notably Edward Sapir.

Third, in the latter half of his life, Van Ginneken developed the idea, that besides psychological factors, sound changes were influenced by genetic and anthropological ones, a view which did not find much agreement in the linguistic community at the time and much less after the Second World War, when much of language biology began to be seen as an absurdity of pre-War sciences.

== Selected works ==
- Principes de linguistique psychologique, essai de synthèse, 1907.
- Handboek der Nederlandsche taal, 1928.
- De Oorzaken der Taalveranderingen, 1930.
- La Reconstruction typologique des langues archaïques de l'humanité, Amsterdam, 1939.

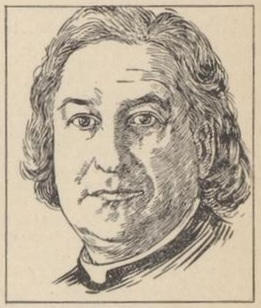
Jac. van Ginneken

== Bibliography ==
- Mélanges de linguistique et de philologie offerts à Jacq. van Ginneken, à l'occasion du soixantième anniversaire de sa naissance. Paris : Klincksieck, 1937.
- Gustave Guillaume, 'Review of: J. Van Ginneken, La Reconstruction typologique des langues archaïques de l'humanité', Amsterdam, 1939, Bulletin de la Société de Linguistique de Paris, 40, 3, 120, 1939, p. 14-24.
- Jan Noordegraaf, 'Hoogvliet versus van Ginneken. Dutch linguistics around the turn of the century'. Historiographia Linguistica 15 (1988), 207-238. (Ook in: Jan Noordegraaf, The Dutch Pendulum. Linguistics in The Netherlands 1740-1900 Münster 1996, 99-129).(http://hdl.handle.net/1871/1033).
- Marcin Sobieszczanski, 'Contribution du R. P. Jacq. Van Ginneken S. J. à la linguistique moderne'. Histoire Épistémologie Langage. 1990, 12/1, p. 133-151.
- Gerrold van der Stroom, The reception of Jac. van Ginneken's language biology. Amsterdam/Münster 1995. (= Cahiers voor taalkunde, 13).
- Ad Foolen, 'Language and emotions. The case of Jac. van Ginneken's Principes de linguistique psychologique (1907)'. In: B. Caron (ed.), Proceedings of the 16th International Congress of Linguists. Oxford: Pergamon 1997. CD-rom, artikelnr. 0030.
- Jan Noordegraaf, 'Dutch linguists between Humboldt and Saussure: the case of Jac. Van Ginneken (1877–1945)'. Historiographia linguistica, 2002, vol. 29, no 1-2, pp. 145–163.
- Gerrold van der Stroom, Jac. van Ginneken onder vuur. Over eigentijdse en naoorlogse kritiek op de taalkundige J.J.A. van Ginneken S.J. (1877-1945). Amsterdam: Stichting Neerlandistiek VU & Münster: Nodus Publikationen 2012. X + 372 pp. ISBN 9088800243 & 3893237685. (Zusammenfassung:'Angriffe auf Jac. van Ginneken. Zur von seinen Zeitgenossen und nach dem Zweiten Weltkrieg an dem Sprachwissenschaftler J.J.A. van Ginneken (1877-1945) geübten Kritik', pp. 321–326).
