= Hieronymus van Alphen =

Dutch jurist and poet (1746–1803)

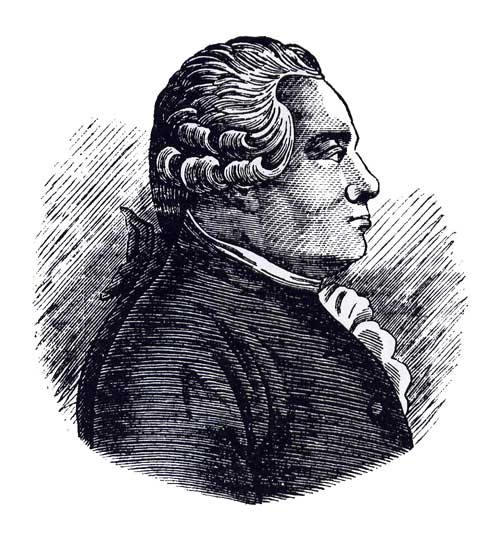
Hieronymus van Alphen (1836)

Hieronymus van Alphen (8 August 1746 in Gouda – 2 April 1803 in The Hague), a jurist in Utrecht, Leiden and The Hague, is especially remembered as a poet, particularly for his poems for children under the title Kleine gedigten voor kinderen (Utrecht, 1778–1782).

Van Alphen was appointed as Treasurer-General of the Dutch Republic in June 1793 but, as an Orangist, was relieved of his position as a result of the Batavian Revolution in 1795.

Van Alphen’s children’s poems express a modern vision of children for his time. As these booklets were a great success, they were reprinted dozens of times and also translated into French, German, English, West Frisian and in the Malay language. Composers as Bartholomeus Rulofs, Ernst Christian Graf and Christian Friedrich Ruppe put them to music.

The affably poet Hieronymus van Alphen considers children as pure and innocent creatures, to whom virtues as obedience, esteem for their parents and for God, as well as modesty could be taught. Van Alphen was of the opinion that children should be able to learn playfully.

== Sources ==
- P.J. Buijnsters (1973), Hieronymus van Alphen (1746-1803), Assen, ISBN 902321062X
- P.J. Buijnsters (editor), Kleine gedigten voor kinderen, Amsterdam, 1998. ISBN 9025301746.

Political offices
| Preceded by François van der Hoop | Treasurer-General; 1793–1795 | Vacant Title next held by Alexander Gogel as Agent for Finance |
