= Theo Thijssen =

Dutch writer, teacher and socialist politician

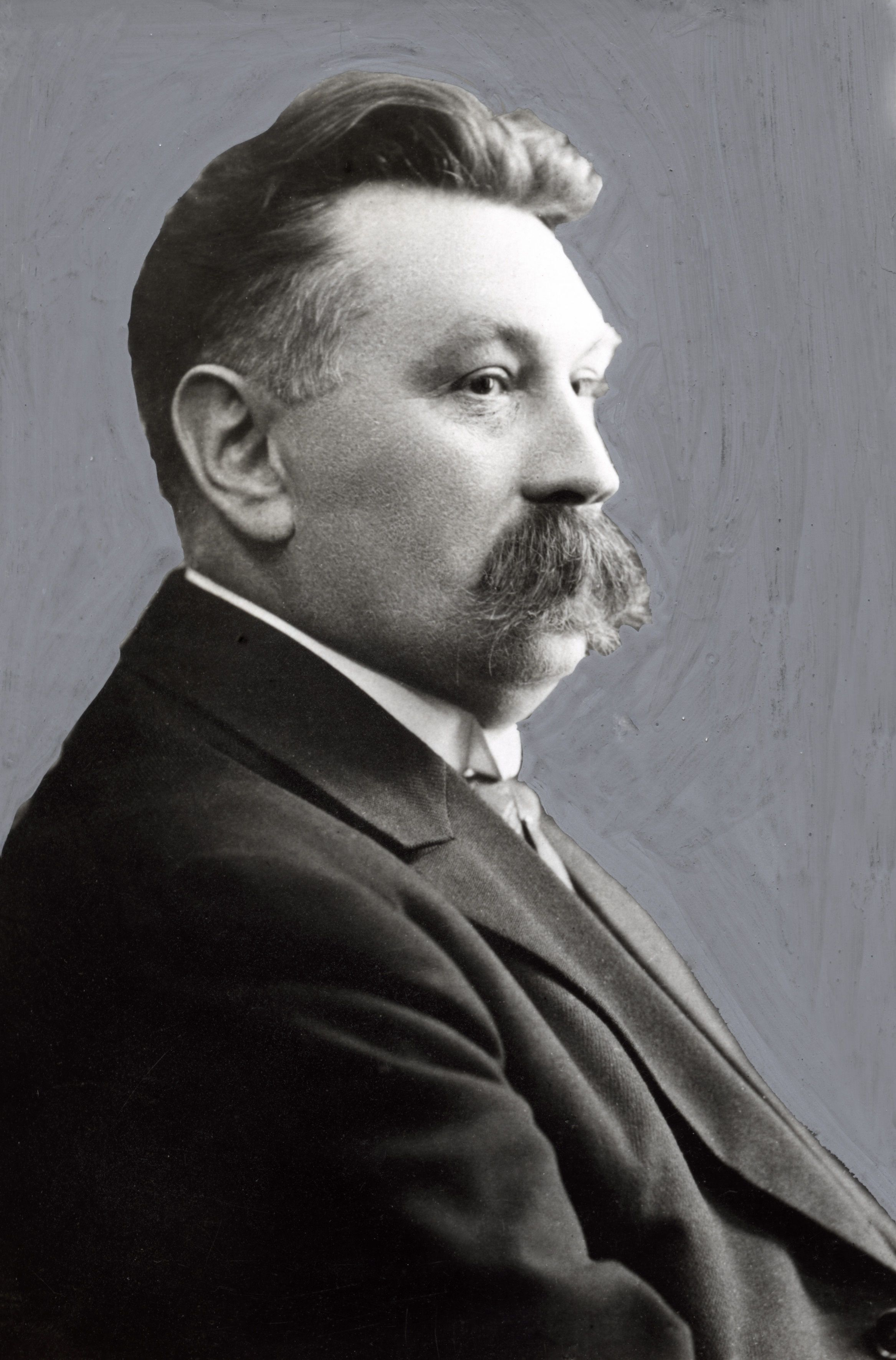
Theo Thijssen

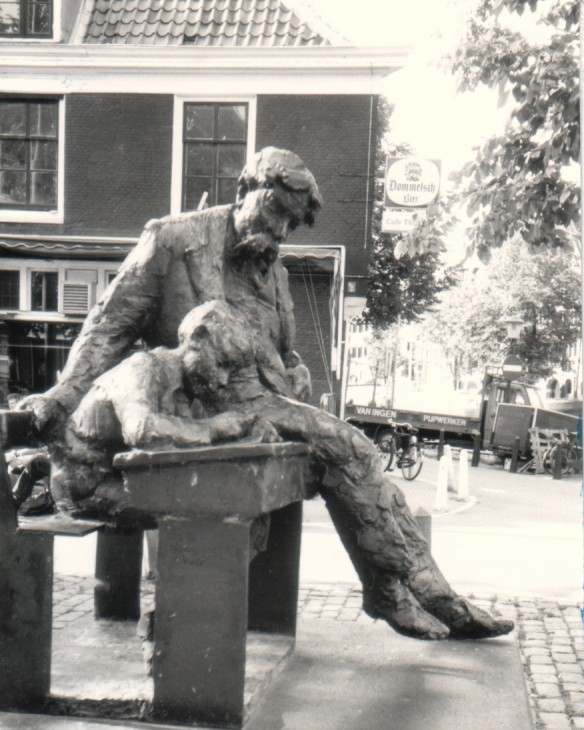
Theo Thijssen sculpture by Hans Bayens

Theodorus Johannes Thijssen (Amsterdam, 16 June 1879 – Amsterdam, 23 December 1943) was a Dutch writer, teacher and socialist politician. He is best known for the book Kees de Jongen.

== Biography ==
Theo Thijssen, the oldest child of six, grew up in the Amsterdam neighbourhood Jordaan, where his father had a small shoe-shop. His family was not wealthy. After his father died when he was eight, the family moved; his mother started a grocery where he and his younger brother had to help out to provide income for the family.

After a tough entrance exam he was admitted to the Rijkskweekschool voor onderwijzers, a teacher training college, in Haarlem with a scholarship. After finishing his studies, he was a teacher from 1898 until 1921 at several primary schools in Amsterdam.

In 1905 he and college friend Peter Bol founded the periodical De Nieuwe School, in which he wrote numerous articles criticising teaching methods, school books and children's literature.

He also wrote some fragments of a story about an imaginary rich boy Kees, that would later become his most famous novel Kees de Jongen.

In 1906 he married Johanna Maria Zeegerman, craft teacher, with whom he had one son. After her death in 1908 he remarried in 1909 with Geertje Dade, with whom he had a daughter and two sons.

In 1921 Thijssen became the director of the Dutch Association of Teachers. He also became editor of "De Bode" (a journal about the working conditions of teachers) and "School en huis" (a journal about education). In the journal about education he again wrote about Kees and made it a more complete story.

This would later become the well-known novel Kees de jongen. Although Thijssen always said the story was fiction there are various similarities with his own childhood. In this book he enriched the Dutch language with the word "zwembadpas", a quick way of walking that Kees had developed. This word became so legendary that the Theo Thijssen Museum organized the day of the "zwembadpas".

Just like his father Thijssen harboured socialistic sympathies from an early age, although he only became member of the Sociaal Democratische Arbeiders Partij (SDAP), a social party in the Netherlands, in 1912. From 1933 until 1940 he was a member of the House of Representatives of the Netherlands for this party, and from 1935 until 1941 member of the Amsterdam city council, also for the SDAP.

In December 1943 he had a series of serious diseases and eventually died from the effects of a stroke.

== Legacy ==
The Dutch award for children's literature, the Theo Thijssen-prijs, is named after him. There are also a number of schools named after him, including the Theo Thijssen school in Amsterdam.

== Bibliography ==
- Barend Wels (1908)
- Jongensdagen (1909)
- Taal en schoolmeester (1911)
- Sommenboek voor de volksschool (1912)
- Cijfers (1913)
- Cijferboek voor de volksschool (1913)
- Kees de jongen (1923)
- Schoolland (1925)
- De gelukkige klas (1926)
- Het grijze kind (1927)
- De examenidioot of De kinderexamens van 1928 (1929)
- Egeltje. Een bundel vrolijk proza (1929)
- Het taaie ongrief (1932), translated by Marc Luxen as "Pulling Stiches"
- De fatale gaping (1934)
- Een bonte bundel (1935)
- In de ochtend van het leven (1941)
- Wat onze kinderen bedreigt (undated)
