= Jehan Yperman =

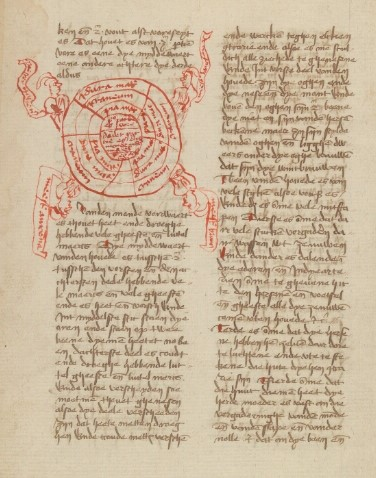
Excerpt of the manuscript "Cyrurgie". Manufactured around 1450. Preserved by the University Library of Ghent.

Jan or Johan or Jehan Yperman (c. 1260 – c. 1331) was a Flemish surgeon and the first medical writer in Dutch. Yperman may have studied in Paris under Lanfranco da Milano, since he often mentions him in his writings.

He wrote two pieces at the beginning of the 14th century about surgery and internal medicine. These manuscripts have known a hidden existence until the end of the 19th century, when they were found in London. In his time, Yperman was a pioneer and innovator when it comes to surgery and medicine. The two manuscripts that are still preserved in the University Library of Ghent, Cyrurgie (surgery) and Medicina (medicine), attest his critical and on experience relying mind. In his Cyrurgie, Yperman makes a last reference to a case of disease in 1328. It is thus very likely that he died shortly after finalising Cyrurgie in c. 1330.
