= Canon of Dutch Literature =

The Canon of Dutch Literature was a list of the most important authors and literary works written in Dutch, established in 2002 on the basis of a poll of members of the Maatschappij der Nederlandse Letterkunde. It has subsequently gone through further iterations,. in part through the publication of a supplementary canon by the Royal Academy of Dutch Language and Literature to correct a perceived lack of modern Dutch-speaking Belgian authors and works on the original list.

== 2002 list of authors ==
The most important authors, ranked according to votes, were held to be:

1. Multatuli
2. Joost van den Vondel
3. W. F. Hermans
4. the anonymous author of Van den vos Reynaerde
5. Louis Couperus
6. Gerard Reve
7. P. C. Hooft
8. Willem Elsschot
9. Gerbrand Bredero
10. Martinus Nijhoff
11. Herman Gorter
12. Harry Mulisch
13. Nicolaas Beets (Hildebrand)
14. Nescio
15. Simon Vestdijk
16. the anonymous author of Beatrijs
17. Hugo Claus
18. Ferdinand Bordewijk
19. Betje Wolff and Aagje Deken
20. the anonymous author of Karel ende Elegast
21. Constantijn Huygens
22. Gerrit Achterberg
23. Louis Paul Boon
24. Hadewijch
25. Guido Gezelle
26. Hella Haasse
27. J. Slauerhoff
28. the anonymous author of Mariken van Nieumeghen
29. Frederik van Eeden
30. Paul van Ostaijen
31. J. C. Bloem
32. Ida Gerhardt
33. the anonymous author of Elckerlijc
34. J. H. Leopold
35. Jan Wolkers
36. E. du Perron
37. Lucebert
38. François Haverschmidt (Piet Paaltjens)
39. Theo Thijssen
40. Marcellus Emants
41. Willem Kloos
42. M. Vasalis
43. the anonymous author of the Wilhelmus
44. Herman Heijermans
45. Willem Bilderdijk
46. Carry van Bruggen
47. Annie M.G. Schmidt
48. Desiderius Erasmus
49. the anonymous author(s) of the Abele spelen
50. Menno ter Braak
51. Jacob Cats
52. Jacob van Lennep
53. Conrad Busken Huet
54. Hendrik Marsman
55. J. J. Voskuil
56. Jacob van Maerlant
57. Arthur van Schendel
58. Maurice Gilliams
59. Anna Blaman
60. Gerrit Kouwenaar
61. Penninc & Pieter Vostaert, authors of the Roman van Walewein
62. the anonymous author of Egidius waer bestu bleven
63. Lodewijk van Deyssel
64. Johan Huizinga
65. Heinric van Veldeke
66. Pieter Langendijk
67. Remco Campert
68. F. Springer
69. A.F.Th. van der Heijden
70. Justus van Effen
71. Hieronymus van Alphen
72. Stijn Streuvels
73. Ina Boudier-Bakker
74. Karel van de Woestijne
75. Gerard Walschap
76. Albert Alberts
77. Simon Carmiggelt
78. Marga Minco
79. Anne Frank
80. Cees Nooteboom
81. Tessa de Loo
82. Frans Kellendonk
83. Arnon Grunberg (Marek van der Jagt)
84. Jan van Ruusbroec
85. the anonymous author/translator of the Dutch Ulenspieghel
86. Anna Bijns
87. Adriaen Valerius
88. the translators of the Statenbijbel
89. Jacob Campo Weyerman
90. Belle van Zuylen
91. Hendrik Tollens
92. Gerrit van de Linde
93. P.A. Daum
94. Jacques Perk
95. Henriette Roland Holst-van der Schalk
96. P.C. Boutens
97. J. van Oudshoorn
98. Herman Teirlinck
99. Adriaan Roland Holst
100. Maria Dermoût
101. Marnix Gijsen
102. Belcampo
103. Godfried Bomans
104. Hans Faverey
105. Jan Cremer
106. Jeroen Brouwers
107. Maarten 't Hart
108. Thomas Rosenboom

== 2002 list of works ==
The original list ranked the most important works by period and by relative significance.

Medieval (pre-1550)

- [Anonymous], Van den vos Reynaerde (13th century)
- [Anonymous], Beatrijs (13th century)
- [Anonymous], Karel ende Elegast (late 12th century)
- [Anonymous], Mariken van Nieumeghen (early 16th century)
- [Anonymous], Elckerlijc (15th century)
- Hadewijch, Strofische gedichten (13th century)
- [Anonymous], Abele spelen (c. 1400)
- Penninc & Pieter Vostaert, Roman van Walewein (early 13th century)
- [Anonymous], Egidius, waer bestu bleven (c. 1350)
- Desiderius Erasmus, Lof der Zotheid (1509)

Golden Age (1550-1700)

- Joost van den Vondel, Gysbreght van Aemstel (1637)
- P.C. Hooft, Lyriek
- Joost van den Vondel, Lucifer (1654)
- G.A. Bredero, Den Spaanschen Brabander (1617)
- P.C. Hooft, Nederlandsche historien (1642-1647)
- [Anonymous], Het Wilhelmus (c. 1572)
- G.A. Bredero, Groot lied-boeck (1622)
- Joost van den Vondel, Hekeldichten (1646)

Eighteenth century

- Betje Wolff & Aagje Deken, Sara Burgerhart (1782)
- Hieronymus van Alphen, Kleine gedigten voor kinderen (1778-1782)
- Pieter Langendijk, Wiskunstenaars of 't gevluchte juffertje (1715)

Nineteenth century

- Multatuli, Max Havelaar (1860)
- Nicolaas Beets (Hildebrand), Camera obscura (1839)
- Louis Couperus, Eline Vere (1889)
- Herman Gorter, Mei (1889)
- Frederik van Eeden, De kleine Johannes (1885-1906)
- Herman Gorter, Verzen (1890)
- Marcellus Emants, Een nagelaten bekentenis (1894)
- Multatuli, Woutertje Pieterse (1862-1877)
- Jacob van Lennep, Ferdinand Huyck (1840)
- Multatuli, Ideën (1862-1877)
- François Haverschmidt (Piet Paaltjens), Snikken en grimlachjes (1867)

Since 1900

- Gerard Reve, De avonden (1947)
- W.F. Hermans, De donkere kamer van Damocles (1958)
- W.F. Hermans, Nooit meer slapen (1966)
- Louis Couperus, Van oude menschen, de dingen die voorbijgaan (1906)
- Louis-Paul Boon, De Kapellekensbaan (1953)
- Hugo Claus, Het verdriet van België (1983)
- Nescio, De uitvreter (1918)
- Harry Mulisch, De ontdekking van de hemel (1992)
- Louis Couperus, De kleine zielen (1901)
- Willem Elsschot, Lijmen (1924)
