= Wilhelmus =

National anthem of the Netherlands

English: "William"
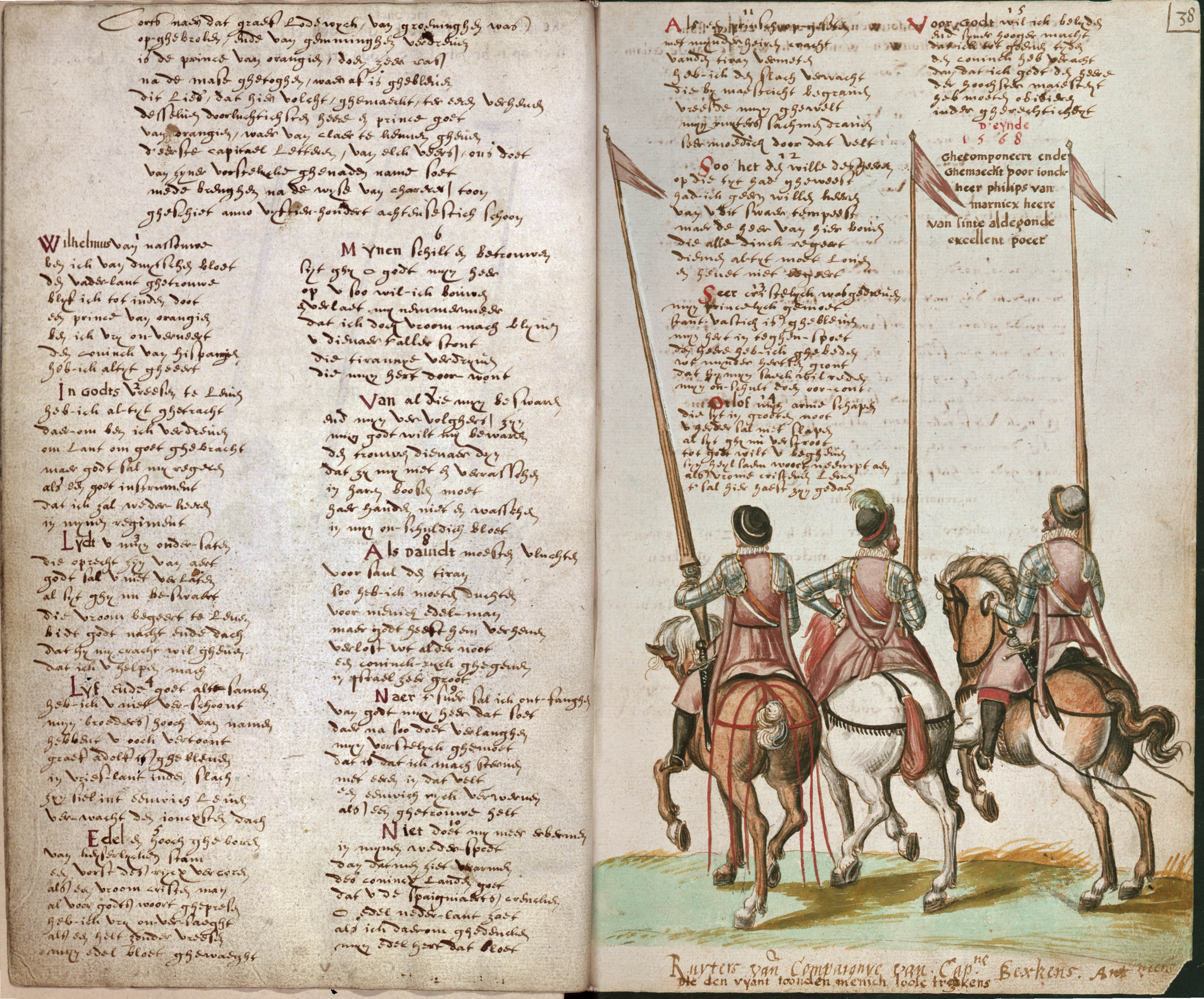
- Early version of the Wilhelmus as preserved in a manuscript from 1617
- National anthem of the Netherlands
- Lyrics: Author disputed, between 1568 and 1572
- Music: Adapted by Adrianus Valerius, composer of original unknown, 1568
- Adopted: 10 May 1932; 94 years ago 1954 (Netherlands Antilles)
- Relinquished: 1964 (Netherlands Antilles)
- Preceded by: "Wien Neêrlands Bloed"

Audio sample
- U.S. Navy Band instrumental version (one verse, one stanza) in F major: file; help

"Wilhelmus van Nassouwe", known simply as the "Wilhelmus", (Note: Dutch: Het Wilhelmus; pronounced [ɦɛt ʋɪlˈɦɛlmʏs]; lit. "The Wilhelmus") is the national anthem of the Netherlands and the Kingdom of the Netherlands. It dates back to at least 1572, making it the oldest national anthem in use today, based on the continuous coexistence of its original melody and lyrics. Although the "Wilhelmus" was not recognized as the official national anthem until 1932, it maintained a fluctuating but significant presence throughout Dutch history from its inception, alternating between periods of factional partisan use and moments of broad, national popularity before gaining its present status. It was also the anthem of the Netherlands Antilles from 1954 to 1964, Suriname until 1959 and the Dutch East Indies (Indonesia) until 1942.

It originated at the start of the Eighty Years' War, the war of Netherlands independence from the Spanish Empire, also known as the Dutch Revolt. Uniquely for an anthem, the "Wilhelmus" is a first-person monologue of a specific figure: the leader in the revolt and father of the nation "Willem van Nassau", or 'William the Silent', better known in the Netherlands as "Willem van Oranje" ('William of Orange'), portraying his dual struggle to remain loyal to the Spanish king without betraying his conscience to God and the Dutch people. Both "Wilhelmus" and the Dutch Revolt should be seen in the light of the 16th century Reformation in Europe and the resulting persecution of Protestants by the Spanish Inquisition in the Low Countries. By combining a psalmic character with political relevance, the "Wilhelmus" stands as the pre-eminent example of a genre of militant music that served both to challenge Catholic clerics and repressive monarchs, and to foster class-transcending social cohesion.

== Inception ==
=== Origins of melody ===
The melody of "Wilhelmus" is a contrafactum of the Catholic French song Autre chanson de la ville de Chartres assiégée par le prince de Condé (Note: Translated as "Another Song of the Town of Chartres Besieged by the Prince of Condé".) (or Chartres in short). This original song ridiculed the failed Siege of Chartres in 1568 by the Protestant (Huguenot) prince Louis I. In an act of musical warfare, the "Wilhelmus" replaced the mockery of one Protestant prince with a triumphant tribute to another—William of Orange—effectively reversing an anti-Protestant satire into a pro-Protestant anthem.

Although the melody originated in 1568, its earliest known notation dates to 1574, when the Wilhelmus was still performed at a rapid, military pace. The current, slower tempo was established by Adriaen Valerius in his "Nederlandtsche Gedenck-clanck" (1626), who adapted the tune into a solemn hymn suitable for devotional use.

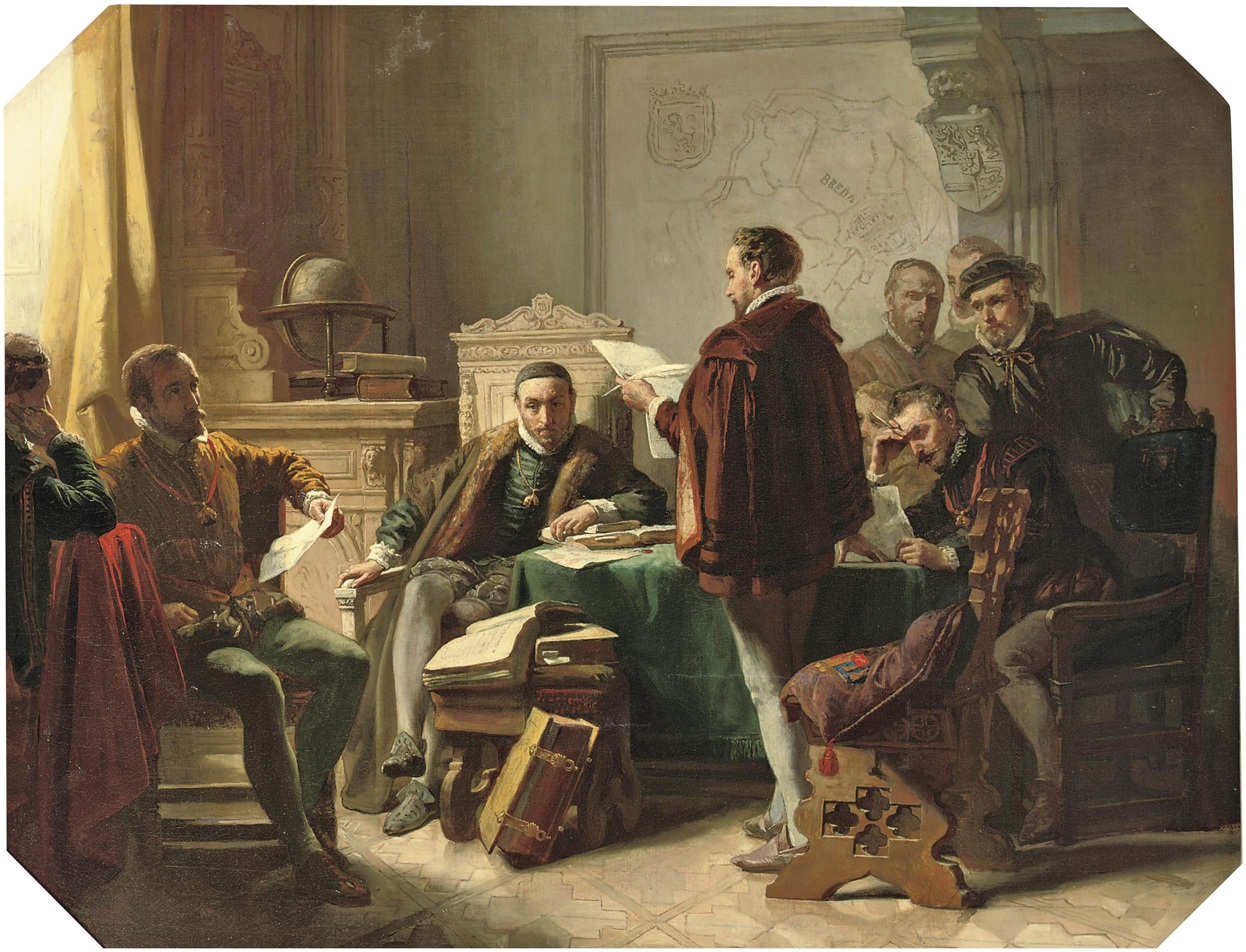
Philips of Marnix presents "Wilhelmus" to William the Silent, by Jacob Spoel (c. 1850).

=== Origins of lyrics ===
The origins of the lyrics are uncertain. "Wilhelmus" was first written some time between the start of the Eighty Years' War in April 1568 and the capture of Brielle on 1 April 1572, since the lyrics do not mention the latter event, even though it was a pivotal turning point in the struggle. The song is first attested in 1573: in a contemporary account of its performance during the siege of Haarlem and in the oldest surviving textual version, a German translation from the same year. The oldest surviving complete Dutch text dates from a Geuzenliedboek printed in 1577–1578.

Soon after the anthem was finished, it was said that either former Antwerp mayor Philips of Marnix, Lord of Saint-Aldegonde or the politician Dirck Coornhert wrote the lyrics. However, this is disputed as neither Marnix nor Coornhert ever mentioned that they had written the lyrics, even though the song was immensely popular in their time. "Wilhelmus" also has some odd rhymes in it. In some cases the vowels of certain words were altered to allow them to rhyme with other words. Some see this as evidence that neither Marnix or Coornhert wrote the anthem, as they were both experienced poets when "Wilhelmus" was written, and it is said they would not have taken these small liberties. Hence some believe that the lyrics of the Dutch national anthem were the creation of someone who just wrote one poem for the occasion and then disappeared from history. A French translation of "Wilhelmus" appeared around 1582.

Recent stylometric research has mentioned Pieter Datheen as a possible author of the text of the Dutch national anthem. By chance, Dutch and Flemish researchers (Meertens Institute, Utrecht University and University of Antwerp) discovered a striking number of similarities between his style and the style of the national anthem.

== Analysis ==
=== Structure ===
Like many of the songs of the Renaissance humanism period, the "Wilhelmus" has a complex structure. This structural choice creates a contrast between public imagery and a private signature of "Willem van Nassau" ('William of Nassau'), the leader of the Dutch Revolt, also known as "Willem van Oranje" ('William of Orange'), "Prinse van Oranje" ('Prince of Orange'), "Willem de Zwijger" ('William the Silent') and Stadholder "Willem I" ('William I'). By opening the very first line with the grand, Latinized name "Wilhelmus", the author adopts the solemn, elevated tone. This formal presentation gives William monumental status, further emphasized by the fifth line's royal predicate "Prinse van Oranje", lifting him from a rebellious nobleman to a sovereign on equal footing with the King of Spain.

In stark contrast to this majestic public exterior is the spelling of his actual everyday spoken name, "Willem", hidden in the anthem's acrostic: the first letters of each of the 15 stanzas form the name "Willem van Nassov". 'Nassov' was a contemporary orthographic variant of 'Nassau'. Moreover, in the current Dutch spelling the first words of the 12th and 13th stanzas begin with Z instead of S. The acrostic effectively functions as an intimate, personal signature, a literary device where the true identity of the protagonist is woven into the DNA of the text itself.

The structure is furthermore composed around a thematic chiasmus: the text is symmetrical, in that verses one and 15 resemble one another in meaning, as do verses two and 14, three and 13, etc., until they converge in the 8th verse, the heart of the song: "Oh David, thou soughtest shelter from King Saul's tyranny. Even so I fled this welter", where the comparison is made not only between the merciful and just King David and William of Orange, but also between the tyrant King Saul and the Spanish crown, lifting William to an almost biblical leader in the Dutch Revolt. William then expresses his hope that he will be rewarded with a "realm", just as David was rewarded with the throne of Israel.

=== Point of view ===
In a form unique for a national anthem, William of Nassau speaks in the first person about how his disagreement with his king troubles him; he tries to be faithful to his king, Phillips II of Spain but he is above all faithful to his conscience: to serve God and the Dutch people. Therefore, the last two lines of the first stanza indicate that the leader of the Eighty Years' War, the Dutch war of independence from the Spanish Empire, had no specific quarrel with king Philip II, but rather with his emissaries in the Low Countries, such as the duke of Alba: Fernando Álvarez de Toledo. This may have been because at the time (late 16th century) it was uncommon to doubt publicly the divine right of kings, who were accountable to God alone. In 1581 the Netherlands nevertheless rejected the legitimacy of the king of Spain's rule over it in the Act of Abjuration.

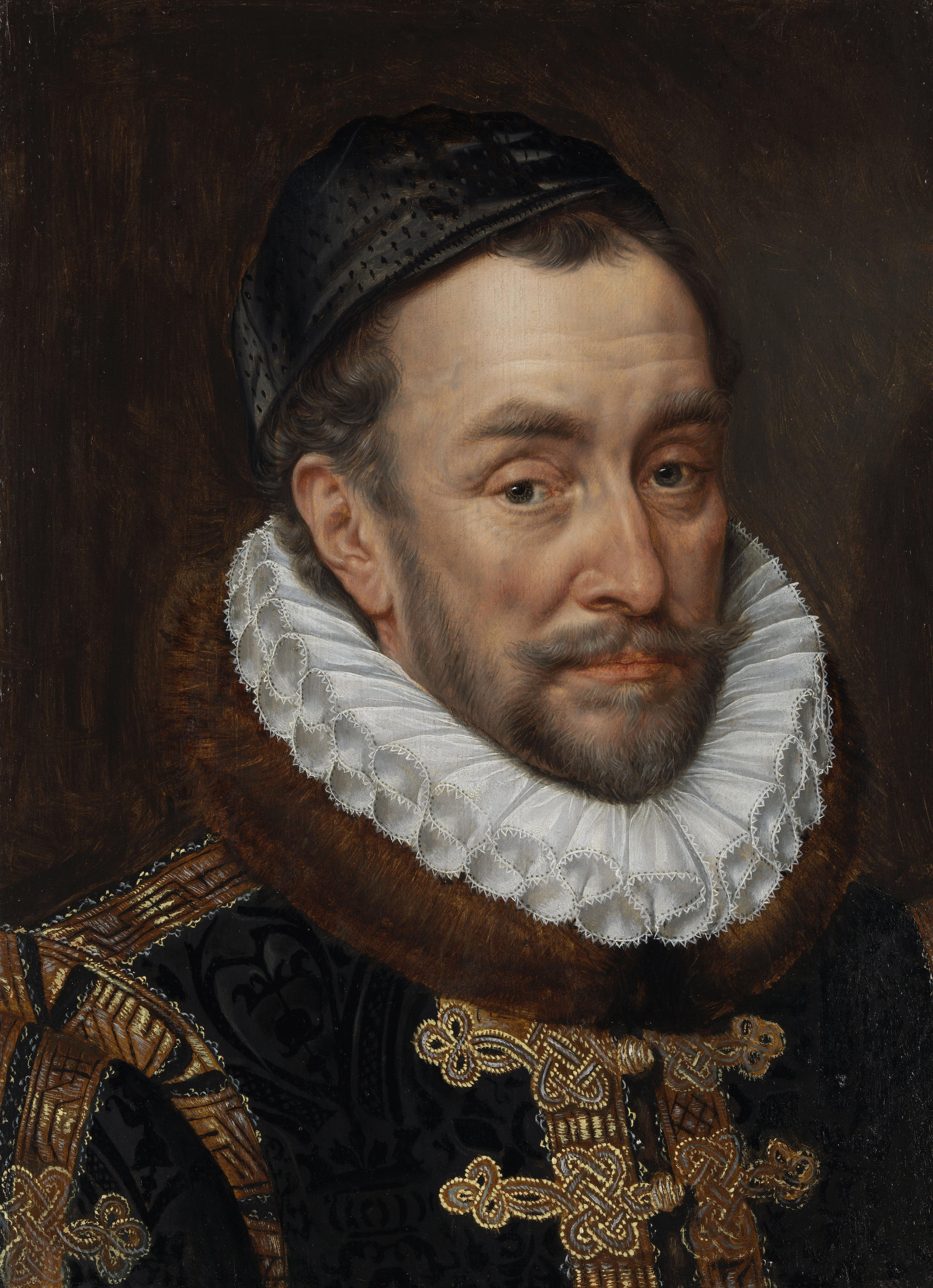
William I, leader of the Dutch Revolt, by Adriaen Thomasz. Key

=== Terminology ===
The word Duytschen in the first stanza, generally translated into English as "Dutch", "native" or "Germanic". Its modern Dutch cognate is the exonym "Duits" ('German'), here it most probably means 'Germanic'. In this context it refers to William's ancestral House of Nassau within the lands of the Holy Roman Empire, while simultaneously seeking to position William as a leader with a connection to the Low Countries. This stood in sharp contrast to the king of Spain, Philip II, who was commonly portrayed as a foreign ruler. By extension William implicitly compared himself to the well-liked Charles V (Philip's father) who, unlike his son, was born in the Low Countries, was initially surrounded by a Flemish court, and possessed at least a working knowledge of Dutch. Explicitly highlighting his Germanic roots, along with emphasizing his ancestral House of Nassau, was furthermore a calculated effort to rally German princes to fund his mercenary armies. In 1570, William was financially ruined and exiled; he desperately needed to appeal to the Protestant German principalities for military and financial backing.

The first stanza furthermore speaks of William as the 'Prince of Orange'; at eleven years old, he inherited the sovereign Principality of Orange, located in what is now Southern France, thereby founding the House of Orange-Nassau. This title highlights the complex debate surrounding his true identity, especially given his francophone upbringing at the court in Brussels. When the Capture of Brielle by the Watergeuzen in 1572 sparked widespread support for the revolt, it led to William being appointed Stadtholder of Holland and Zeeland, in the absence of the king. From this moment on, his dynasty went on to lead the Netherlands almost continuously—first as chosen Stadtholders and later as monarchs—only interrupted during the Stadtholderless periods (1650–1672 and 1702–1747) and the French Period (1794 tot 1814). Today, the current King Willem-Alexander, stands as the latest descendant of this line, representing the historical continuity of both William's dynasty and the anthem's wording in his name.

== Performance ==
The "Wilhelmus" appears throughout Dutch history in numerous accounts and written sources since its inception, reflecting its evolution from a 16th-century song of revolt to its current status as national anthem.

=== 16th century ===
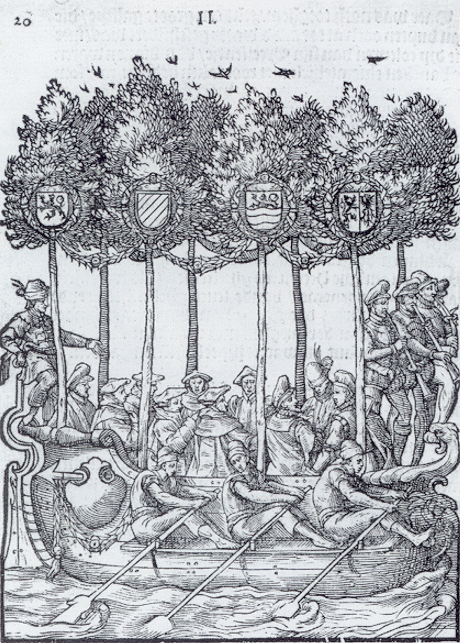
Woodcut of city musicians playing the Wilhelmus during the Entry of William of Orange into Brussels (1577)

The "Wilhelmus" was widely used during the Dutch Revolt and the Dutch Republic as political and military signal; the song is first attested in 1573, when it was sung by a soldier during the siege of Haarlem, and played mockingly by Spanish musicians during the siege of Alkmaar in 1573. It has been claimed that during the torture of Balthasar Gérard (the assassin of William of Orange) in 1584, the song was sung by the guards who sought to overpower Gérard's screams when boiling pigs' fat was poured over him. It was played at William of Orange's triumphal entry into Brussels in 1577, for Maurice of Nassau at Breda in 1590, and on the carillon after the liberation of Groningen in 1594.

=== 17th century ===
While the "Wilhelmus" retained its role as a military signal in the Eighty Years' War on land, for example after the relief of Wesel in 1629, it was also used at sea before naval engagements by the Dutch East India Company (VOC) in colonial wars, and traveled to distant destinations. In July 1655, during the Great Ambon War in the Moluccas, a trumpeter blared the "beloved tune" under cover of darkness to startle the defending Makassarese and Moluccan forces after VOC troops scaled a strategic cliff, signalling at the same time the fleet to launch its assault. It was also being played by the English during the joined Dutch-English Battle off Hormuz in 1625 against the Portuguese, and at a banquet for Michiel de Ruyter in Sardinia in 1675.

Throughout the "Rampjaar" (Disaster Year) of 1672, when the Dutch Republic faced simultaneous invasions from France, England, and the German bishoprics of Münster and Cologne, the "Wilhelmus" was widely embraced by mobs in the streets to pressure republican regents into appointing William III of Orange as stadtholder, while the Münster forces under Bernhard von Galen ordered their trumpeters to play the anthem to trick the Dutch garrison into expecting allied reinforcements. This tactic was reversed on 30 December 1672 during the liberation of Coevorden, where invading Dutch cavalry blared the "Wilhelmus" upon breaching the gates to induce panic among the occupying Münster troops.

The use of the "Wilhelmus" was not limited to warfare or formal occasions, but could also mark moments of good fortune. Dutch explorer Johan Nieuhof described in his journal in 1656 how, during Jan van Riebeeck's command at the Dutch Cape Colony, a trumpeter played the tune "Wilhelmus van Nassouwen" when Van Riebeeck visited a stranded whale in Table Bay, a find that was initially seen as economically valuable.

During this period, a notable distinction emerged between the song's functional and domestic uses. While soldiers and sailors utilized the melody as a brisk, functional signal, the poet Adriaen Valerius recorded a much slower, more solemn version in his 1626 work "Nederlantsche Gedenck-clanck". Intended for singing with lute accompaniment in a domestic or devotional setting, Valerius's arrangement transformed the spirited martial tune into a stately hymn.

=== 18th century ===
In the 18th century the "Wilhelmus" evolved into a popular melody associated with Orangist celebrations, such as the entry of William IV in Leeuwarden in 1734 and (after the Second Stadtholderless Period) in 1747. During this era, the tempo was significantly accelerated, earning the song the nickname Prinsenmars ("Princes' March") and causing the tune to be performed predominantly as an instrumental piece.

Abroad, the popularity of the dance-like ''Wilhelmus'' did not go unnoticed. Johann Mattheson wrote in 1749 how "blissfully it was sung, danced, blown, and played on the carillons everywhere." At the age of 10, Wolfgang Amadeus Mozart composed seven variations of the song while he visited The Hague in 1766, when his father, Leopold Mozart, noted in his diary "that the Wilhelmus was sung, blown, and piped by everyone in Holland". Its widespread use suggests its role was broader than that of a mere dynastic anthem and has been described as showing features of a national anthem before the modern concept of national anthems had fully developed.

However, the "Wilhelmus" became highly polarizing during the late 18th century. After the republican Patriotten were defeated in 1787, and the authority of the Orangist stadholders had been restored, the church bells of Schoonhoven reportedly played the "Wilhelmus" continuously in honour of William V. Yet, following the outbreak of the Batavian Revolution—inspired by the French Revolution—the song was banned. The tune, burdened by its association with the name "Princes' March" and the House of Orange Nassau, was rejected as a symbol of the monarchy and the ancien régime.

=== 19th century ===
First recording of the "Wilhelmus"

As the French period came to an end, and the Sovereign Principality of the United Netherlands was founded in 1813, shortly before it was defined by the Congress of Vienna, the "Wilhelmus" was no longer an obvious choice for a national anthem. The song had been discredited during the French Period as it was associated with Orangism and anti-republicanism. Moreover, the melody was used in many anti-papal and satirical contrafacts, which damaged its reputation as a unifying song. The newly installed prince, William Frederick (the future King William I), son of William V, sought to represent the entire nation and decided to break with the song. Despite this, the "Wilhelmus" was played in Leeuwarden in 1813 to celebrate the return of the prince.

A competition was organised for a new anthem, and the winning entry was "Wien Neêrlands Bloed", written by Hendrik Tollens and composed by Johann Wilhelm Wilms. It was officially adopted in 1817, and although it gained a short-lived popularity during the Belgian Revolution in 1830, it never fully displaced the "Wilhelmus" and later became increasingly controversial, because of the second line, "Free from foreign stain". Meanwhile, the "Wilhelmus" regained popularity in a new musical form; the republication of the Valerius melody in 1871 and Eduard Kremser's romantic arrangement of 1877 helped reintroduce a more solemn version of the song, which was taught in schools and reduced the problem of multiple competing versions.

By the late nineteenth century, "Wien Neêrlands Bloed" was increasingly criticised, including by the Tachtigers. Problems arose around the wording of the song after the inauguration of Queen Wilhelmina in 1898, when Voor vorst en vaderland ("for king and fatherland") had to be adapted to Voor vorstin en vaderland ("for queen and fatherland"), disturbing the metre. At Wilhelmina's request, the "Wilhelmus" was played at her inauguration instead of the official national anthem. It was also increasingly played at other official occasions in the Netherlands, in the Dutch colonial empire and abroad, partly because of the royal preference, which led to confusion over the status of the two songs.

=== 20th century ===
Vocal rendition of the "Wilhelmus" in 1920

A "Wilhelmus" edition for harmony and fanfare bands was issued in 1928 following an instruction by the Minister of Defence, arranged by Coenraad Lodewijk Walther Boer and titled Nederlandsch Volkslied ("Dutch Anthem"). Partly at Wilhelmina's suggestion, the "Wilhelmus" replaced "Wien Neêrlands Bloed" as the official Dutch anthem on 10 May 1932.

The "Wilhelmus" itself received some protest over its historical association with the Orangists and Protestants, but these objections largely faded during the German occupation of the Netherlands in the Second World War. After early demonstrations against the German occupation in June 1940, at which crowds spontaneously sang the "Wilhelmus", the German authorities banned public references to the Dutch royal family and other royal symbols. It was then taken up by all factions of the Dutch resistance, even socialists who had previously taken an anti-monarchist stance. The pro-German National Socialist Movement (NSB), who had sung the "Wilhelmus" at their meetings before the occupation, replaced it with "Alle Man van Neerlands Stam" ("All Men of Dutch Origin"). The sixth stanza also gained particular resonance during the war because of the line de tirannie verdrijven ("to drive away tyranny"), which could now be read as referring to the Nazi occupation.

The anthem also acquired symbolic force in the Dutch East Indies: after the Japanese conquest in March 1942, NIROM broadcasts reportedly continued to end with the "Wilhelmus" for several days, after which three employees of the station were executed by the Japanese authorities.

=== Current usage ===
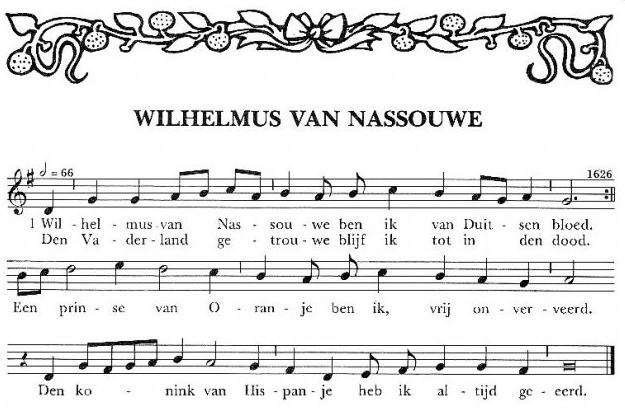
First stanza of the "Wilhelmus"

The "Wilhelmus" is played at official ceremonies, including the reception of foreign heads of state and other formal occasions, Remembrance of the Dead, Liberation Day, King's Day, Inauguration of a Dutch king or queen, and during national sporting events or international sporting events involving winning athletes representing the Netherlands, such as the FIFA World Cup, the UEFA European Championship, the Olympic Games, and the Dutch Grand Prix. The 1st stanza is always played, sometimes followed by the 6th stanza, rather than the entire song, which would result in about 15 minutes of music. (Each of the 15 stanzas lasts 56 seconds, and the last stanza has a ritenuto.)

The "Wilhelmus" is also used in Flemish nationalist gatherings as a symbol of cultural unity with the Netherlands. Yearly rallies like the "IJzerbedevaart" close with singing the 6th stanza, after which the Flemish national anthem "De Vlaamse Leeuw" is sung.

== Lyrics ==
The "Wilhelmus"
Choir accompanied by an organ sings the first and sixth stanza

The "Wilhelmus", as it was printed in the geuzenliedboek (lit. "Beggars' songbook") in 1581, used the following text as an introduction to the song:

Een nieuw Christelick Liedt gemaect ter eeren des Doorluchtichsten Heeren, Heere Wilhelm Prince van Oraengien, Grave van Nassou, Patris Patriae, mijnen Genaedigen Forsten ende Heeren. Waer van deerste Capitael letteren van elck veers syner Genaedigen Forstens name metbrengen. Na de wijse van Chartres.

Translation:

A new Christian song made in the honour of the most noble lord, lord William Prince of Orange, count of Nassau, Pater Patriae (Father of the Nation), my merciful prince and lord. [A song] of which the first capital letter of each stanza form the name of his merciful prince. To the melody of Chartres.

Original Dutch (1568)
WILLEM VAN NASSOV

Wilhelmus van Nassouwe
Ben ick van Duytschen Bloedt,
Den Vaderland ghetrouwe
Blijf ick tot inden doet;
Een Prince van Orangien
Ben ick vry onverveert.
Den Coninck van Hispangien.
Heb ick altijt gheeert.

In Godes vrees te leven
Heb ick altijt betracht,
Daerom ben ick verdreven
Om Land, om Luyd ghebracht:
Maer Godt sal my regeren
Als een goet Instrument,
Dat ick sal wederkeeren
In mijnen Regiment.

Lijdt U, mijn Ondersaten,
Die oprecht zijn van aert,
Godt sal u niet verlaten
Al zijt ghy nu beswaert:
Die vroom begheert te leven,
Bidt Godt nacht ende dach.
Dat Hy my cracht wil gheven
Dat ick u helpen mach.

Lijf ende goed al te samen
Heb ick u niet verschoont,
Mijn Broeders, hooch van Namen,
Hebbent u oock vertoont:
Graef Adolff is ghebleven,
In Vrieslandt in den Slach,
Sijn siel int eewich leven
Verwacht den jonghsten dach.

Edel en Hooch gheboren
Van Keyserlicken stam:
Een Vorst des Rijcks vercoren,
Als een vroom Christen-man,
Voor Godes Woort ghepreesen,
Heb ick vrij onversaecht,
Als een helt zonder vreesen
Mijn edel bloet gewaecht.

Mijn schilt ende betrouwen
Zijt ghy, O Godt, mijn Heer.
Op U soo wil ick bouwen,
Verlaet my nimmermeer;
Dat ick doch vroom mag blijven
U dienaer t'aller stond
Die tyranny verdrijven,
Die my mijn hert doorwondt.

Val al die my beswaren,
End mijn vervolghers zijn,
Mijn Godt wilt doch bewaren
Den trouwen dienaer dijn:
Dat sy my niet verasschen
In haeren boosen moet,
Haer handen niet en wasschen
In mijn onschuldich bloet.

Als David moeste vluchten
Voor Saul den tyran:
Soo heb ick moeten suchten
Met menich edelman:
Maer Godt heeft hem verheven,
Verlost uit alder noot,
Een Coninckrijck ghegheven
In Israël, seer groot.

Na tsuer sal ick ontfanghen
Van Godt, mijn Heer, dat soet,
Daer na so doet verlanghen
Mijn vorstelick ghemoet,
Dat is, dat ick mag sterven
Met eeren, in dat velt,
Een eeuwich rijk verwerven
Als een ghetrouwe helt.

Niets doet my meer erbarmen
In mijnen wederspoet,
Dan dat men siet verarmen
Des Conincks landen goet,
Dat ud de Spaengiaerts crencken,
O edel Neerlandt soet,
Als ick daeraen ghedencke,
Mijn edel hert dat bloet.

Als een Prins opgheseten
Met mijnes heyres cracht,
Van den tyran vermeten
Heb ick den slach verwacht,
Die, by Maestricht begraven,
Bevreesde mijn ghewelt;
Mijn ruyters sach men draven
Seer moedich door dat velt.

Soo het den wil des Heeren
Op die tijt had gheweest,
Had ick geern willen keeren
Van u dit swaer tempeest:
Maer de Heer van hier boven
Die alle dinck regeert,
Die men altijt moet loven,
En heeftet niet begeert.

Seer christlick was ghedreven
Mijn princelick ghemoet,
Stantvastich is ghebleven
Mijn hert in teghenspoet,
Den Heer heb ick ghebeden
Van mijnes herten gront,
Dat Hy mijn saeck wil reden,
Mijn onschult doen oircont.

Oorlof mijn arme schapen,
Die zijt in grooten noot.
U Herder sal niet slapen,
Al zijt ghy nu verstroit:
Tot Godt wilt u begheven,
Sijn heylsaem woort neemt aen,
Als vrome Christen leven,
Tsal hier haest zijn ghedaen.

Voor Godt wil ick belijden
End sijner grooter macht,
Dat ick tot gheenen tijden
Den Coninck heb veracht:
Dan dat ick Godt den Heere,
Der hoochster Majesteyt,
Heb moeten obedieren,
In der gherechticheyt.

Contemporary Dutch
WILLEM VAN NAZZOV

Wilhelmus van Nassouwe
ben ik, van Duitsen bloed,
den vaderland getrouwe
blijf ik tot in den dood.
Een Prinse van Oranje
ben ik, vrij onverveerd,
den Koning van Hispanje
heb ik altijd geëerd.

In Godes vrees te leven
heb ik altijd betracht,
daarom ben ik verdreven,
om land, om luid gebracht.
Maar God zal mij regeren
als een goed instrument,
dat ik zal wederkeren
in mijnen regiment.

Lijdt u, mijn onderzaten
die oprecht zijt van aard,
God zal u niet verlaten,
al zijt gij nu bezwaard.
Die vroom begeert te leven,
bidt God nacht ende dag,
dat Hij mij kracht wil geven,
dat ik u helpen mag.

Lijf en goed al te samen
heb ik u niet verschoond,
mijn broeders hoog van namen
hebben 't u ook vertoond:
Graaf Adolf is gebleven
in Friesland in de slag,
zijn ziel in 't eeuwig leven
verwacht de jongste dag.

Edel en hooggeboren,
van keizerlijke stam,
een vorst des rijks verkoren,
als een vroom christenman,
voor Godes woord geprezen,
heb ik, vrij onversaagd,
als een held zonder vreze
mijn edel bloed gewaagd.

Mijn schild ende betrouwen
zijt Gij, o God mijn Heer,
op U zo wil ik bouwen,
verlaat mij nimmermeer.
Dat ik doch vroom mag blijven,
uw dienaar t'aller stond,
de tirannie verdrijven
die mij mijn hart doorwondt.

Van al die mij bezwaren
en mijn vervolgers zijn,
mijn God, wil doch bewaren
de trouwe dienaar dijn,
dat zij mij niet verrassen
in hunne boze moed,
hun handen niet en wassen
in mijn onschuldig bloed.

Als David moeste vluchten
voor Sauel den tiran,
zo heb ik moeten zuchten
als menig edelman.
Maar God heeft hem verheven,
verlost uit alder nood,
een koninkrijk gegeven
in Israël zeer groot.

Na 't zuur zal ik ontvangen
van God, mijn Heer, het zoet,
daarnaar zo doet verlangen
mijn vorstelijk gemoed:
dat is, dat ik mag sterven
met ere in dat veld,
een eeuwig rijk verwerven
als een getrouwe held.

Niets doet mij meer erbarmen
in mijne wederspoed
dan dat men ziet verarmen
des Konings landen goed.
Dat u de Spanjaards krenken,
o edel Neerland zoet,
als ik daaraan gedenke,
mijn edel hart dat bloedt.

Als een prins opgezeten
met mijner heireskracht,
van de tiran vermeten
heb ik de slag verwacht,
die, bij Maastricht begraven,
bevreesden mijn geweld;
mijn ruiters zag men draven
zeer moedig door dat veld.

Zo het de wil des Heren
op die tijd was geweest,
had ik geern willen keren
van u dit zwaar tempeest.
Maar de Heer van hierboven,
die alle ding regeert,
die men altijd moet loven,
Hij heeft het niet begeerd.

Zeer christlijk was gedreven
mijn prinselijk gemoed,
standvastig is gebleven
mijn hart in tegenspoed.
De Heer heb ik gebeden
uit mijnes harten grond,
dat Hij mijn zaak wil redden,
mijn onschuld maken kond.

Oorlof, mijn arme schapen
die zijt in grote nood,
uw herder zal niet slapen,
al zijt gij nu verstrooid.
Tot God wilt u begeven,
zijn heilzaam woord neemt aan,
als vrome christen leven,—
't zal hier haast zijn gedaan.

Voor God wil ik belijden
en zijne grote macht,
dat ik tot gene tijden
de Koning heb veracht,
dan dat ik God de Here,
de hoogste Majesteit,
heb moeten obediëren
in de gerechtigheid.

IPA transcription (Note: See Help:IPA/Dutch and Dutch phonology.)

[ʋɪɫ.ˈɦɛɫ.mʏs̠ vɑn nɑ.ˈs̠ɑu̯.ə]
[bɛn ɪk vɑn ˈdœy̑t.s̠ən blut]
[dɛn ˈvaː.dər.ˌlɑnt ɣə.ˈtrɑu̯.ə]
[blɛi̯v ɪk tɔt ɪn dɛn doːt]
[ən ˈprɪn.s̠ə vɑn ˌoː.ˈrɑn.jə]
[bɛn ɪk frɛi̯ ˌɔɱ.vər.ˈveːrt]
[dɛn ˈkoː.nɪŋ vɑn ɦɪ.ˈs̠pɑn.jə]
[ɦɛp ɪk ˈɑɫ.tɛi̯t ɣə.ˈeːrt]

[ɪn ˈɣɔ.dəs̠ vreːs̠ tə ˈleː.vən]
[ɦɛp ɪk ˈɑɫ.tɛi̯t bə.ˈtrɑxt]
[daːr.ˈɔm bɛn ɪk vər.ˈdreː.vən]
[ɔm lɑnt ɔm lœy̑t ɣə.ˈbrɑxt]
[maːr ɣɔt z̠ɑɫ mɛi̯ rə.ˈɣeː.rən]
[ɑɫs̠ eːn ɣut ˌɪn.s̠try.ˈmɛnt]
[dɑt ɪk z̠ɑɫ ˌʋeː.dər.ˈkeː.rən]
[ɪn ˈmɛi̯.nən ˌreː.ʒi.ˈmɛnt]

[lɛi̯t y mɛi̯n ˌɔn.dər.ˈz̠aː.tən]
[di ɔ.ˈprɛxt z̠ɛi̯t vɑn aːrt]
[ɣɔt z̠ɑɫ y nit vər.ˈlaː.tən]
[ɑɫ z̠ɛi̯t ɣɛi̯ nʏ bə.ˈz̠ʋaːrt]
[di vroːm bə.ˈɣeːrt tə ˈleː.vən]
[bɪt ɣɔt nɑxt ˈɛn.də dɑx]
[dɑt ɦɛi̯ mɛi̯ krɑxt ʋɪɫ ˈɣeː.vən]
[dɑt ɪk y ˈɦɛɫ.pən mɑx]

[lɛi̯v ən ɣut ɑɫ tə ˈs̠aː.mən]
[ɦɛp ɪk y nit vər.ˈs̠xoːnt]
[mɛi̯n ˈbru.dərs̠ ɦoːx vɑn ˈnaː.mən]
[ˈɦɛ.bən t‿y oːk vər.ˈtoːnt]
[ɣraːv ˈaː.dɔɫf ɪs̠ ɣə.ˈbleː.vən]
[ɪn ˈfris̠.lɑnt ɪn də s̠lɑx]
[z̠ɛi̯n z̠iɫ ɪn t‿ˈeːu̯.əx ˈleː.vən]
[vər.ˈʋɑxt də ˈjɔŋ.s̠tə dɑx]

[ˈeː.dəɫ ən ˌɦoː.ɣə.ˈboː.rən]
[vɑn ˈkɛi̯.z̠ər.lə.kə s̠tɑm]
[ən vɔrs̠t dɛs̠ rɛi̯ks̠ vər.ˈkɔ.rən]
[ɑɫs̠ ən vroːm ˈkrɪs̠.tən.mɑn]
[voːr ˈɣɔ.dəs̠ ʋoːrt ɣə.ˈpreː.z̠ən]
[ɦɛp ɪk vrɛi̯ ˌɔɱ.vər.ˈs̠aːxt]
[ɑɫs̠ ən ɦɛɫt ˈz̠ɔn.dər ˈvreː.z̠ə]
[mɛi̯n ˈeː.dəɫ blut ɣə.ˈʋaːxt]

[mɛi̯n s̠xɪɫt ˈɛn.də bə.ˈtrɑu̯.ən]
[ˈz̠ɛi̯t ɣɛi̯ oː ɣɔt mɛi̯n ɦeːr]
[ɔp y z̠oː ʋɪɫ ɪk ˈbɑu̯.ən]
[vər.ˈlaːt mɛi̯ ˌnɪ.mər.ˈmeːr]
[dɑt ɪk dɔx froːm mɑɣ ˈblɛi̯.vən]
[yu̯ ˈdi.naːr ˈt‿ɑ.lər s̠tɔnt]
[də ˌti.rɑ.ˈni vər.ˈdrɛi̯.vən]
[di mɛi̯ mɛi̯n ɦɑrt ˈdoːr.ʋɔnt]

[vɑn ɑɫ di mɛi̯ bə.ˈz̠ʋaː.rən]
[ɛn mɛi̯n vər.ˈvɔɫ.gərs̠ z̠ɛi̯n]
[mɛi̯n ɣɔt ʋɪɫ dɔx bə.ˈʋaː.rən]
[də ˈtrɑu̯.ə ˈdi.naːr dɛi̯n]
[dɑt z̠ɛi̯ mɛi̯ nit və.ˈrɑ.s̠ən]
[ɪn ˈɦʏ.nə ˈboː.z̠ə mut]
[ˈɦʏn ˈɦɑn.dən nit ɛn ˈʋɑ.s̠ən]
[ɪn mɛi̯n ˌɔn.ˈs̠xʏɫ.dəx blut]

[ɑɫs̠ ˈdaː.vɪt ˈmu.s̠tə ˈvlʏx.tən]
[voːr ˈs̠ɑu̯.əɫ dɛn ti.ˈrɑn]
[z̠oː ɦɛp ɪk ˈmu.tən ˈz̠ʏx.tən]
[ɑɫs̠ ˈmeː.nəx ˈeː.dəɫ.ˌmɑn]
[maːr ɣɔt ɦeːft ɦɛm vər.ˈɦeː.vən]
[vər.ˈlɔs̠t œy̑t ˈɑɫ.dər noːt]
[ən ˈkoː.nɪŋ.ˌkrɛi̯k ɣə.ˈɣeː.vən]
[ɪn ˈɪs̠.raː.ˌɛɫ z̠eːr ɣroːt]

[naː‿t z̠yːr z̠ɑɫ ɪk ɔnt.ˈfɑŋ.ən]
[vɑn ɣɔt mɛi̯n ɦeːr ɦɛt z̠ut]
[ˈdaːr.ˌnaːr z̠oː dut vər.ˈlɑŋ.ən]
[mɛi̯n ˈvɔr.s̠tə.lək ɣə.ˈmut]
[dɑt ɪs̠ dɑt ɪk mɑx ˈs̠tɛr.vən]
[mɛt ˈeː.rə ɪn dɑt vɛɫt]
[ən ˈeːu̯.əx rɛi̯k vər.ˈʋɛr.vən]
[ɑɫs̠ ən ɣə.ˈtrɑu̯.ə ɦɛɫt]

[nits̠ dut mɛi̯ meːr ɛr.ˈbɑr.mən]
[ɪn ˈmɛi̯.nə ˈʋeː.dər.ˌs̠put]
[dɑn dɑt mɛn z̠it vər.ˈɑr.mən]
[dɛs̠ ˈkoː.nɪŋs̠ ˈlɑn.dən ɣut]
[dɑt y də ˈs̠pɑn.jaːrts̠ ˈkrɛŋ.kən]
[oː ˈeː.dəɫ ˈneːr.ˌlɑnt z̠ut]
[ɑɫs̠ ɪk ˈdaːr.ˌaːn ɣə.ˈdɛŋ.kə]
[mɛi̯n ˈeː.dəɫ ɦɑrt dɑt blut]

[ɑɫs̠ ən prɪns̠ ˈɔp.ɣə.ˌz̠eː.tən]
[mɛt ˈmɛi̯.nər ˈɦɛi̯.rəs̠.ˌkrɑxt]
[vɑn də ti.ˈrɑn vər.ˈmeː.tən]
[ɦɛp ɪk də s̠lɑx vər.ˈʋɑxt]
[di bɛi̯ maː.ˈs̠trɪxt bə.ˈɣraː.vən]
[bə.ˈvreːz̠.dən mɛi̯n ɣə.ˈʋɛɫt]
[mɛi̯n ˈrœy̑.tərs̠ z̠ɑx mɛn ˈdraː.vən]
[z̠eːr ˈmu.dəɣ doːr dɑt vɛɫt]

[z̠oː ɦɛt də ʋɪɫ dɛs̠ ˈɦeː.rən]
[ɔp di tɛi̯t ʋɑs̠ ɣə.ˈʋeːs̠t]
[ɦɑt ɪk ɣeːrn ˈʋɪ.lən ˈkeː.rən]
[vɑn y dɪt z̠ʋaːr tɛm.ˈpeːs̠t]
[maːr də ɦeːr vɑn ˌɦiːr.ˈboː.vən]
[di ˈɑ.lə dɪŋ rə.ˈɣeːrt]
[di mɛn ˈɑɫ.tɛi̯t mut ˈloː.vən]
[ɦɛi̯ ɦeːft ɦɛt nit bə.ˈɣeːrt]

[z̠eːr ˈkrɪs̠t.lək ʋɑs̠ ɣə.ˈdreː.vən]
[mɛi̯n ˈprɪn.s̠ə.lək ɣə.ˈmut]
[ˌs̠tɑnd.ˈvɑs̠.təx ɪs̠ ɣə.ˈbleː.vən]
[mɛi̯n ɦɑrt ɪn ˈteː.ɣən.ˌs̠put]
[də ɦeːr ɦɛp ɪk ɣə.ˈbeː.dən]
[œy̑t ˈmɛi̯.nəs̠ ˈɦɑr.tən ˈɣrɔnt]
[dɑt ɦɛi̯ mɛi̯n z̠aːk ʋɪɫ ˈrɛ.dən]
[mɛi̯n ˈɔn.s̠xʏɫt ˈmaː.kən kɔnt]

[ˈoːr.lɔf mɛi̯n ˈɑr.mə ˈs̠xaː.pən]
[di z̠ɛi̯t ɪn ˈɣroː.tə noːt]
[yu̯ ˈɦɛr.dər z̠ɑɫ nit ˈs̠laː.pən]
[ɑɫ z̠ɛi̯t ɣɛi̯ ny vər.ˈs̠troːi̯t]
[tɔt ɣɔt ʋɪɫt y bə.ˈɣeː.vən]
[z̠ɛi̯n ˈɦɛi̯ɫ.z̠aːm ʋoːrt neːmt aːn]
[ɑɫs̠ ˈvroː.mə ˈkrɪs̠.tən ˈleː.vən]
[t‿z̠ɑɫ ɦiːr ɦaːs̠t z̠ɛi̯n ɣə.ˈdaːn]

[voːr ɣɔt ʋɪɫ ɪk bə.ˈlɛi̯.dən]
[ɛn ˈz̠ɛi̯.nə ˈɣroː.tə mɑxt]
[dɑt ɪk tɔt ˈɣeː.nə ˈtɛi̯.dən]
[də ˈkoː.nɪŋ ɦɛb vər.ˈɑxt]
[dɑn dɑt ɪk ɣɔd də ˈɦeː.rə]
[də ˈɦoːx.s̠tə maː.jəs̠.ˈtɛi̯t]
[ɦɛp ˈmu.tən ˌoː.bə.di.ˈeː.rən
[ɪn də ɣə.ˈrɛx.təx.ɦɛi̯t]

English translation
WILLIAM OF NASSAU

William of Nassau, scion
Of a Dutch and ancient line,
I dedicate undying
Faith to this land of mine.
A prince I am, undaunted,
Of Orange, ever free,
To the king of Spain I've granted
A lifelong loyalty.

I've ever tried to live in
The fear of God's command
And therefore I've been driven
From people, home, and land,
But God, I trust, will rate me
His willing instrument
And one day reinstate me
Into my government.

Let no despair betray you,
My subjects true and good.
The Lord will surely stay you
Though now you are pursued.
He who would live devoutly
Must pray God day and night
To throw His power about me
As champion of your right.

Life and my all for others,
I sacrificed, for you!
And my illustrious brothers
Proved their devotion too.
Count Adolf, more's the pity,
Fell in the Frisian fray,
And in the eternal city
Awaits the judgement day.

I, nobly born, descended
From an imperial stock.
An empire's prince, defended
(Braving the battle's shock
Heroically and fearless
As pious Christian ought)
With my life's blood the peerless
Gospel of God our Lord.

A shield and my reliance,
O God, Thou ever wert.
I'll trust unto Thy guidance.
O leave me not ungirt.
That I may stay a pious
Servant of Thine for aye
And drive the plagues that try us
And tyranny away.

My God, I pray thee, save me
From all who do pursue
And threaten to enslave me,
Thy trusted servant true.
O Father, do not sanction
Their wicked, foul design,
Don't let them wash their hands in
This guiltless blood of mine.

O David, thou soughtest shelter
From King Saul's tyranny.
Even so I fled this welter
And many a lord with me.
But God the Lord did save him
From exile and its hell
And, in His mercy, gave him
A realm in Israel.

Fear not 't will rain sans ceasing
The clouds are bound to part.
I bide that sight so pleasing
Unto my princely heart,
Which is that I with honour
Encounter death in war,
And meet in heaven my Donor,
His faithful warrior.

Nothing so moves my pity
As seeing through these lands,
Field, village, town and city
Pillaged by roving hands.
O that the Spaniards rape thee,
My Netherlands so sweet,
The thought of that does grip me
Causing my heart to bleed.

Astride on steed of mettle
I've waited with my host
The tyrant's call to battle,
Who durst not do his boast.
For, near Maastricht ensconced,
He feared the force I wield.
My horsemen saw one bounce it
Bravely across the field.

Surely, if God had willed it,
When that fierce tempest blew,
My power would have stilled it,
Or turned its blast from you.
But He who dwells in heaven,
Whence all our blessings flow,
For which aye praise be given,
Did not desire it so.

Steadfast my heart remaineth
In my adversity
My princely courage straineth
All nerves to live and be.
I've prayed the Lord my Master
With fervid heart and tense
To save me from disaster
And prove my innocence.

Alas! my flock. To sever
Is hard on us. Farewell.
Your Shepherd wakes, wherever
Dispersed you may dwell,
Pray God that He may ease you.
His gospel be your cure.
Walk in the steps of Jesu
This life will not endure.

Unto the Lord His power
I do confession make
That ne'er at any hour
Ill of the king I spake.
But unto God, the greatest
Of Majesties I owe
Obedience first and latest,
For Justice wills it so.

== Adaptations ==
=== Arrangements ===
The melody of the "Wilhelmus" has undergone in several transformations. The earliest versions were based on the French satirical song "O la folle entreprise du prince de Condé" from 1568, which had a relatively brisk tempo. In the 17th century, a stylistic divergence emerged: while it remained a rapid instrumental signal for military use, Adrianus Valerius published a slowed, solemn arrangement in his "Nederlandtsche Gedenck-clanck" (1626). Intended for domestic devotional singing, which transformed the martial tune into a stately hymn. Other contemporary adaptations include the variations for recorder by the blind carillon-player Jacob van Eyck in his Der Fluyten Lust-hof.

In the 18th century, the melody was significantly accelerated and assimilated into the "Prinsenmars", a livelier march tune which no longer aligned the lyrics with the rhythm, leading the "Wilhelmus" to be performed predominantly as an instrumental piece. It was this lively, dance-like version that Wolfgang Amadeus Mozart used as the basis for his seven piano variations (KV 25) in 1766. It was not until the late 19th century that the solemn character of the anthem was restored; Eduard Kremser's Romantic arrangement, based on the earlier Valerius version, helped establish the slower, dignified form that became the official national anthem of the Netherlands.

The "Wilhelmus" came with the Dutch East India Company to the Dutch East Indies. It was first attested in a Malay translation in 1883, when it was played on a gamelan and sung in 'their native' language during the colonial exhibition in Amsterdam.

=== Contrafacta ===
The "Wilhelmus", itself a contrafactum, was frequently used for subsequent contrafacta. During the Dutch Republic such contrafacta appeared in religious, political and satirical contexts. They could affirm the song's Orangist associations, but also be used polemically against political and religious opponents, and could also turn against Orange and its supporters.

The song Wenn alle treue werden sung to the tune of "Wilhelmus"

Abroad, the melody was used in the Swedish folk song "Ack, Göta konungarike" ("Alas, Gothic Kingdom"), written in 1626, which deals with the liberation struggle of Sweden under Gustav Vasa. The grand ducal anthem of Luxembourg, "De Wilhelmus", derives also its melody from the Dutch het "Wilhelmus". The song was introduced during the Personal union of the Netherlands and Luxembourg. It had lyrics written to it in 1919. The German song Wenn alle untreu werden, used since 1923 the melody of the "Wilhelmus". After World War I, the song became popular among German nationalists, including the SS.

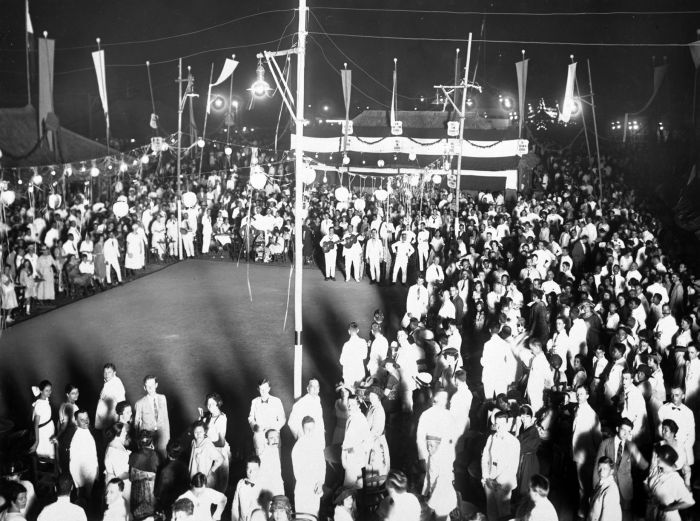
Het Wilhelmus sung during Koningsdag at the Pasar Gambir in Batavia (1922).

In the Dutch East Indies, the "Wilhelmus" has been found in an Mentawaian contrafactum (one of the local languages spoken in what is now Indonesia), created in the early 20th century:

Mentawai

Pateangkat bachata
Gogoi kinenegan
Ait poeioetoekat mata
Radja Bolanda en
Rimata Wilhelmina
Sibakat sita ne
Makate leuw bachania
Ka sakalangan te

English Translation

O, how cheerful is our heart
On this day
The birthday
Of the Queen of Holland
Our Queen Wilhelmina
Who is our head
Who also loves
The Mentawaians

In later accounts, resentment grew against Dutch colonial rule in Indonesia, and the repetitive exposure to the "Wilhelmus" and its positive adaptations. As early as 1928, Indonesian Nationalists chose "Indonesia Raya" as their national anthem. Indonesian writer Pramoedya Ananta Toer mentions in one of his books that his father refused to sing the "Wilhelmus", a practice that became known as Wilhelmusrelletjes ("little Wilhelmus riots"). Political prisoners who refused to sing the Wilhelmus were transferred to harsh conditions in Boven-Digoel concentration camp, which gave birth to the contrafactum "Het Digoel Wilhelmus":

Dutch

Wilhelmus van Nassauwe
Zing ik omdat ik moet,
Den vaderland getrouwe
Dat dronk mijn broeders bloed.
De knechten van Oranje
Lieten mij ongedeerd,
De rechter zei, 'k verban je
Opdat je ginds krepeert.

In Blanda's vrees te leven
Heb 'k niet genoeg betracht,
Daarom ben ik verdreven
En word ik hier gebracht.
De heerschers, die regeeren,
Kozen als instrument
In dienst der suikerheeren [...]

English Translation

Wilhelmus van Nassauwe
I sing because I must
Loyal to the homeland
That drank my brothers' blood
The servants of Orange
Left me unharmed
The judge said, I exile you
So that you suffer there.

To live in fear of (the) Dutch
I did not sufficiently obey
That's why I was exiled
And I was taken here
The rulers, who govern
Chosen as instrument
In service of the sugar kings [...]

This Indonesian contrafactum repurposed the melody of the "Wilhelmus"—the soundtrack to Dutch liberation from foreign tyranny, a role it had recently reprised during the German occupation in World War II—to challenge the Dutch themselves as a foreign authority, transforming the anthem into a weapon of resistance against the very power it was designed to celebrate.
