= Wenn =

Wenn or WENN may refer to:

- WENN (AM), a radio station (1320 AM) licensed to Birmingham, Alabama, United States
- Remember WENN, a television series that aired from 1996 to 1998 on American Movie Classics
- World Entertainment News Network, an entertainment news wire service based in London, England
- Former callsign of WERC-FM, a radio station (105.5 FM) licensed to Hoover, Alabama, United States
- Former callsign of WACT, a radio station (1420 AM) licensed to Tuscaloosa, Alabama, United States
- St Wenn, village and parish in the Restormel district of mid-Cornwall, United Kingdom
- Stuart Wenn, an Australian rules football field umpire in the Australian Football League

In German-language music:

- Wenn du da bist
- Wenn alle untreu werden
- Wenn Der Letzte Schatten Fällt, album by L'Âme Immortelle
- Wenn der Himmel brennt

== See also ==
- Wenns, municipality in the Imst district of Austria
