= We Gather Together (disambiguation) =

"We Gather Together" is a 16th-century Christian hymn.

We Gather Together may also refer to:

- "We Gather Together" (Knots Landing), a 1984 television episode
- "We Gather Together" (Party of Five), a 1999 television episode
- "We Gather Together" (Roseanne), a 1989 television episode
- "We Gather Together" (Thirtysomething), a 1987 television episode
- We Gather Together, an album by the Ray Charles Singers
