= Merck toch hoe sterck =

17th century Dutch war song composed by Adriaen Valerius

English: Notice just how strong
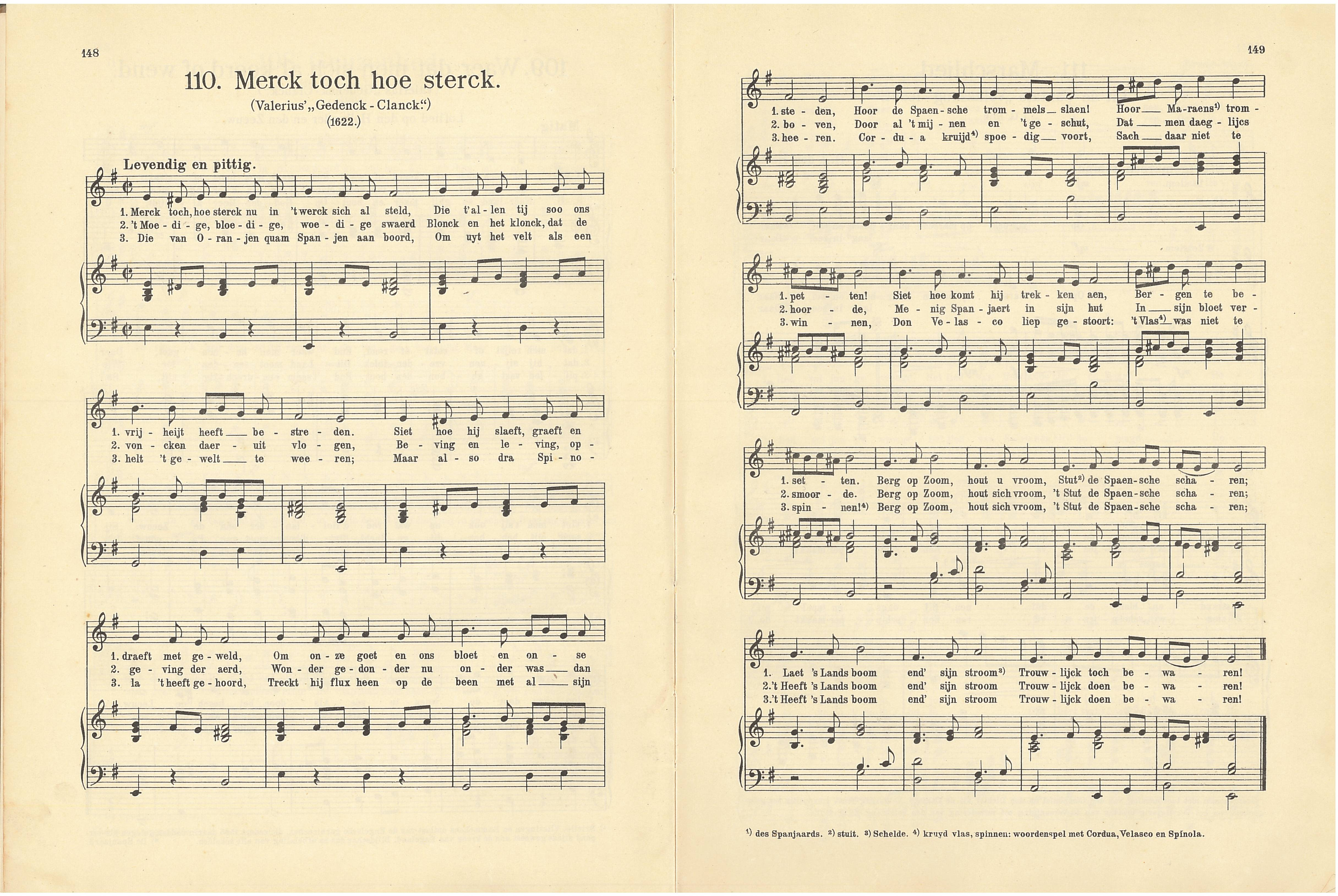
- City anthem of Bergen op Zoom
- Lyrics: Adriaen Valerius, 1622-25
- Music: English lute song, 1606

Audio sample
- Merck toch hoe sterck: file; help

"Merck toch hoe sterck" ("Notice just how strong") is a Dutch war song and sea shanty written between 1622 and 1625 by Adriaen Valerius (who adapted the "Wilhelmus", the national anthem of the Netherlands). The music is based on an Elizabethan lute song written by Thomas Campion and John Dowland in 1606 (What if a Day or a Month). It was adopted as the anthem for Bergen op Zoom.

== Lyrics ==
Merck, toch hoe sterck, Nu int werck, sich al steld!
Die’t allen ty, Soo ons vryheyt heeft bestreden:
Siet hoe hy slaeft, graeft, en draeft met geweld!
Om onse goet, En ons bloet, En onse steden:

Hoor de Spaensche trommels slaen!
Hoor Maraens trompetten!
Siet hoe komt hy trecken aen!
Bergen te besetten.

Berg op Zoom, Hout u vroom,
Stut de Spaensche scharen;
Laet’s Lands boom, End’ syn stroom,
Trouw'lyck toch bewaren.

’tMoedige, bloedige, woedige, swaerd
Blonck, en het klonck, dat de voncken daer uyt vlogen.
Beving, en leving, opgeving der aerd,
Wonder, gedonder, Nu onder was, nu boven,
Door al’t mijnen en’t geschut
Dat men daeg'lycx hoorde;
Menig Spanjaert in zyn hut
In syn bloet versmoorde.
Berg op Zoom, Hout sich vroom
’tStut de Spaensche scharen;
’tHeeft ’sLands boom, En syn stroom
Trouw'lyck doen bewaren.

Die van Oranjen, quam Spanjen aen boord,
Om uyt het velt, als een Helt, ’tgewelt te weeren:
Maer also dra, Spinola ’tneeft gehoord,
Treckt hy flocx heen, op de been met al zyn Heeren.
Cordua kruyd spoedig voort,
Sach daer niet te winnen,
Don Velasco liep gestoort,
’tVlas was niet te spinnen.
Berg op Zoom,Hout sich vroom
’tStut de Spaensche scharen;
’tHeeft ’sLands boom, En zyn stroom
Trouw'lyck doen bewaren.

Translation:

Notice how strongly he puts himself to work
He who has ceaselessly fought against our freedom
See how he slaves away, digs and marches with force
For our possessions and our blood and our cities.

Hear the Spanish drums beat!
Hear the Maranish trumpets!
See how he marches forth
to occupy Bergen.

(Chorus)
Berg op Zoom stay strong,
Stem the Spanish hordes;
Let our land soil and its streams
be loyally guarded!

The courageous, bloody, wrathful sword
It shone and it clanged such that the sparks flew from it.
Quaking and shaking, upheaval of earth,
Wonder and thunder, what was below is now above;

Through all the mines and the gunnery,
That one could hear all day,
Many a Spaniard in his cabin
choked on his own blood.

(Chorus)

He of Orange came to oppose the Spanish,
From the field he repelled their violence as a hero;
And as soon as Spinola heard it,
He beat a fast retreat with all his lords.

Cordua soon crawled forth,
He failed to win there
Don Velasco was disturbed
There was nothing he could do

(Chorus)
