= Ack, Göta konungarike =

17th-century Swedish folk song

"Ack, Göta konungarike" ("Oh, the Kingdom of Göta") is a Swedish folk song, first appearing in the historical record in 1626. It is a song of praise to Gustav Vasa and tells the story of how Sweden broke free from Danish rule under the Kalmar Union and renounced Catholicism. It features prominently on Jan Johansson’s 1969 album Musik genom fyra sekler (Music Through Four Centuries). It has also been recorded by the Hootenanny Singers. The melody is the same as that of the Dutch national anthem, Wilhelmus, which was originally written in the 1580s in tribute to the Dutch freedom fighter William of Nassau, who himself liberated his country from Spanish rule and Catholicism. The melody had also appeared even earlier as a battle song during the Huguenot Wars in France. It is likely that the lyrics were adapted in Sweden to refer to Gustav Vasa as the local equivalent of a freedom fighter.
