= Ina Boudier-Bakker =

Dutch writer

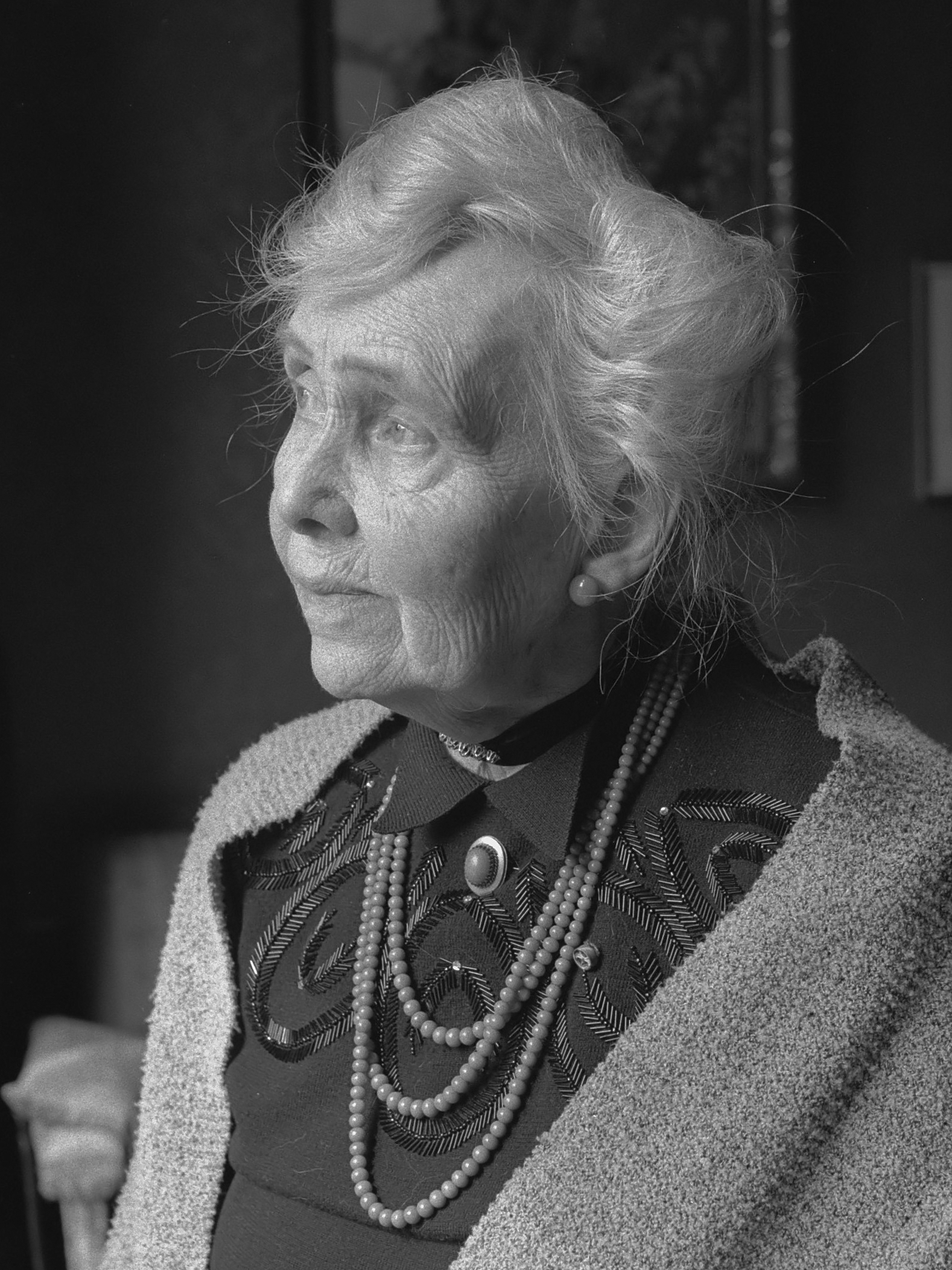
- Boudier-Bakker in 1960
- Born: 15 April 1875; Amsterdam, Netherlands
- Died: 26 December 1966 (aged 91); Utrecht, Netherlands
- Occupation: writer
- Writing career
- Genre: novels

Klaziena "Ina" Boudier-Bakker (Dutch: [klaːˈzinaː ˈʔinaː buˌdiːr ˈbɑkər]; 15 April 1875 – 26 December 1966) was a Dutch novelist. Her most famous work is De klop op de deur (The knock on the door), written in 1930.

== Biography ==
Klaziena Bakker was born on 15 April 1875 in Amsterdam, Netherlands. She was the eldest child of Frederik Bakker and Aleida Emilia Holm. She had two brothers who were both called Rudolf and who both died in childhood.

At age 27, Bakker married Henry Boudier, director of the PTT. Because of his work they moved regularly – they lived for example in Utrecht, Vianen, Aerdenhout and Groningen. In 1929 they returned to Utrecht.

In 1902 she wrote her debut, the novella Machten (Powers), but she really captured her place among the great Dutch authors with her novel Armoede (Poverty), which she wrote in Utrecht between 1907 and 1909. Also in Utrecht, she wrote her best known book, De klop op de deur (The knock on the door), in 1930. This was adapted for television in 1970. During World War II she made a poem about every act of terrorism; shortly after the war, she recited these poems. After the war Boudier-Bakker's life was influenced by the illness of her husband and herself and by her husband's death in 1952. Unabashed, she wrote several more books, among which Finale (1957) that became a grand success. In 1963 Boudier-Bakker's received the Tollensprijs for her full oeuvre.

At the age of 91, Boudier-Bakker died on 26 December 1966 in Utrecht, Netherlands.

== Work ==
Her oeuvre is often classified as "salon realism" or "the female novel". This latter type was introduced by the critic Menno ter Braak for books published during the last days of naturalism, which were usually written by female authors. In these books the most pronounced naturalistic features were so weakened that what remained was a simple, but realistic story concerning the fortunes of a family. Herein much attention was paid to extensive detailed descriptions and psychological digressions. Ina Boudier-Bakker was considered a master in this genre, and earned her nickname "Queen of the Dutch women's novel",.

Although she was very widely read, the appreciation of the audience was not shared by critics. Regarding De Klop op de Deur (The Knock on the Door) De Gids (The Guide, a Dutch cultural and literary magazine) published jokingly the shortest review: "Do not open!". Menno ter Braak put himself strongly against "the cozy living room of the psychological novel". In 1935 he further damaged Ina Boudier-Bakker's reputation by accusing her of plagiarism in her novel Vrouw Jacob. Currently, there is not much appreciation for her work – a contemporary literary historian qualified it as "just as abundant as uniform".

== Bibliography ==
- "Najaar", Nederland (1899) June (debut)
- "Avond", Van eigen bodem (enclosed sheet of Elsevier's Geïllustreerd Maandschrift (Elsevier's Illustrated Monthly)) (1899) August
- Oom Sam's misrekening (under the pseudonym I. B.) (series Voor den coupé) (Bruna, 1899)
- Van Amsterdam naar Londen (under the pseudonym I. B.) (series Voor den coupé) (Bruna, 1900)
- Machten (novellas) (1902)
- Het beloofde land (novel) (1903)
- Verleden. Drama in three acts (1903)
- Wat komen zal (novel) (1904)
- Kinderen (novellas, among others"Inkt" and "Pa's kinderen") (1905)
- Grenzen (novel) (1907)
- Zorgen (novellas) (1907)
- Het hoogste recht. Play in four acts (1907)
- Armoede (novel) (1909)
- Een dorre plant (1909)
- Bloesem (novellas) (1912)
- Novellen voor de jeugd (1913)
- De ongeweten dingen (novellas) (1915)
- Het spiegeltje (novel) (1917)
- Aan den overkant (novel) (1920)
- De moderne vrouw en haar tekort (brochure) (1921)
- In de engte (novellas) (1922)
- Blijde geboorte. A bundle of Christmas Stories (1923)
- De straat (novel) (1924)
- De moeders (novella) (1925)
- Dans (novella) (1926)
- Springvloed. Play in three acts with a prologue (1926)
- Twee voeten (novel) (1928)
- Tooverlantaarn (novellas) (1928/29)
- De klop op de deur. Amsterdam family novel (1930), also on DBNL
- De verschijningen der menschenziel in het sprookje (1932)
- Het kind in den strijd met leugen en vrees (1932)
- Saraï (1933)
- Vrouw Jacob (novel) (1935)
- Paul (1936)
- Ester. Play (1938)
- Aan den grooten weg (1939)
- Uren met Andersen (1940)
- Dierentuin (1941)
- Geeft Acht! Verses from the war years 1940–45 (1945)
- Goud uit stro. Amsterdam family novel of the years 1830–31 (1950)
- Heiligdom van 't hart (1951)
- De wekker (1952)
- Vier grote Oranjes. A character sketch (1954)
- Kleine kruisvaart (1955)
- Altijd elders (1956)
- Finale (1957)
- De eeuwige andere (1959)
- Momenten (1961)
- Honger (1962)
- Boeket uit het werk van Ina Boudier-Bakker (anthology) (1965)
- Uit de kartonnen doos (1967)
- Met de tanden op elkaar. Dagboeknotities '40–'45, ed. Hans Edinga (1975); new edition: Zo doods en stil en donker. Oorlogsdagboek 1940–1945, ed. Rémon van Gemeren (2013)
