= Wien Neêrlands Bloed =

Former national anthem of the Netherlands

Wien Neêrlands bloed
English: Those in whom Dutch blood
- Former national anthem of Netherlands
- Lyrics: Hendrik Tollens
- Music: Johann Wilhelm Wilms
- Adopted: 1815
- Relinquished: 1932

Audio sample
- Wien Neêrlands bloed (instrumental): file; help

Wien Neêrlands bloed (Those in whom Dutch blood) was the national anthem of the Netherlands between 1815 and 1932.

== History ==
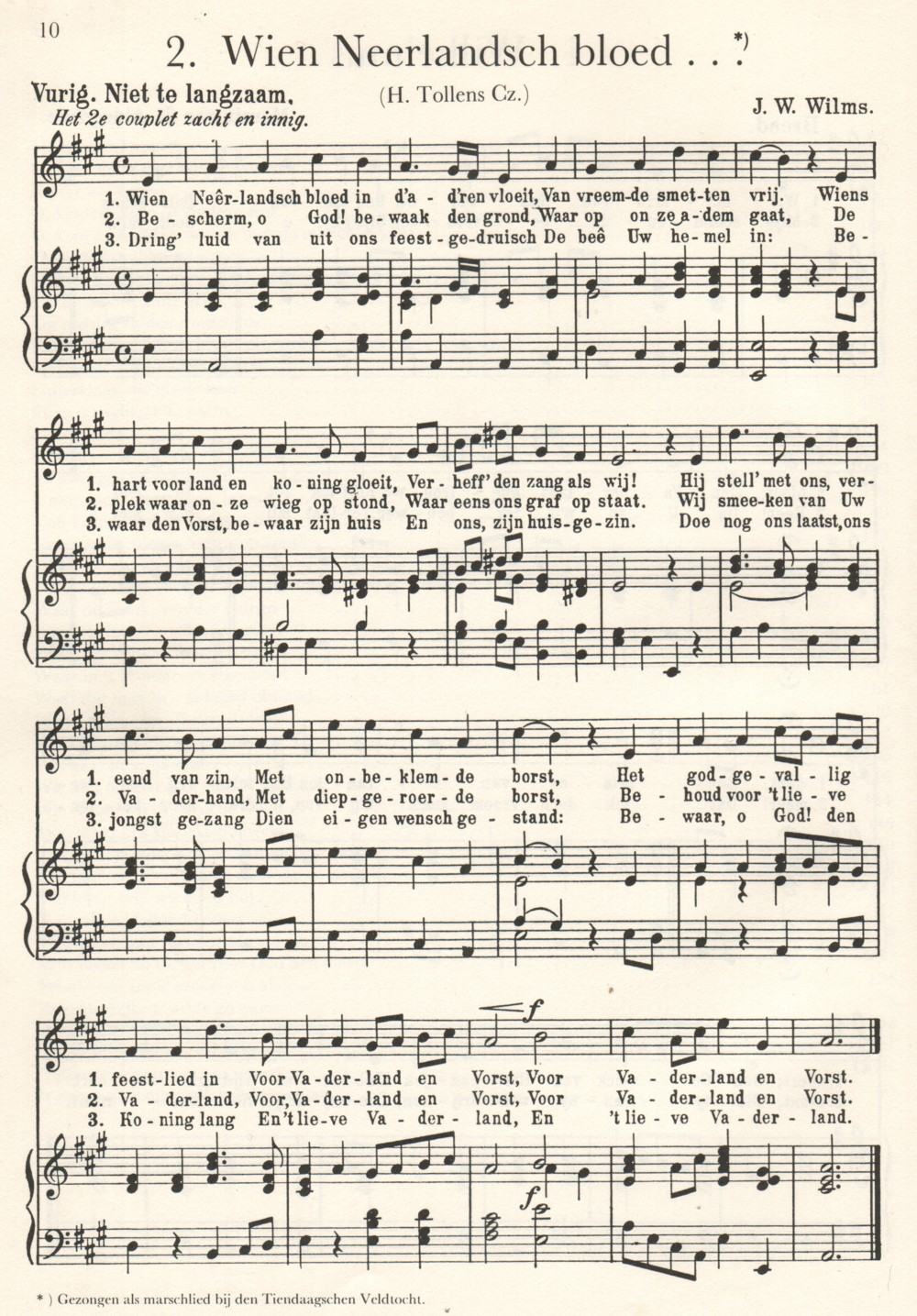
Wien Neêrlands Bloed

At the foundation of the Kingdom of the Netherlands in 1815, it was decided that a national anthem was needed. The song "Het Wilhelmus" – which is the national anthem today – was already well known in the time of the Dutch Republic. At that time, however, it was more of a party or faction hymn than a national one, being associated with and glorifying the House of Orange – which in the politics of the 17th and 18th century Netherlands had enthusiastic supporters but also bitter foes. In particular, the Wilhelmus was unpopular with the anti-Orangist Patriot party, which dominated the country (under French tutelage) for a considerable time.

Following the fall of Napoleon, the new prince of the Netherlands, William Frederick of Orange, believed his family's factional song was no longer suitable for the times. William Frederick had also gained sovereignty over the Southern Netherlands in 1814, completing his family's three-century quest to unite the Low Countries. This was made official when the north was united with the south in 1815 to form the United Kingdom of the Netherlands, with William Frederick styling himself as King William I. The song expressed William the Silent's desire to be rewarded with a "realm" as a reward for having fought Philip II of Spain much like David had been rewarded with the throne of Israel for fighting against Saul. Having united the "realm" referenced in the song, William wanted a new hymn that would show his intent to stand above factions. A new anthem would also better appeal to his overwhelmingly Catholic southern subjects, while the Wilhelmus might be interpreted as expressing Calvinist sentiments.

A competition was accordingly organized by Admiral Jan Hendrik van Kinsbergen which was won by the Dutch poet Hendrik Tollens (1780–1856) with his poem Wien Neerlandsch bloed ..., which, after some failed attempts by less gifted composers, was set to music by Johann Wilhelm Wilms (1772–1847), a Dutch-German expatriate living in Amsterdam.

There were two versions: the original, and a changed version created for the reign of Queen Wilhelmina. The latter modernized the language, adapted the text to the fact there was now a queen instead of a king and also replaced the controversial second line van vreemde smetten vrij ("free from foreign taint"), which was increasingly seen as racist in the colonial era.

Despite the adoption of the new anthem, Het Wilhelmus remained popular and was played at Wilhelmina's inauguration in 1898.

Wien Neêrlands bloed was officially replaced by Het Wilhelmus on 10 May 1932, although it remained in use by the Royal Netherlands Navy and Army until 1939. The replacement came in time for the silver jubilee of Wilhelmina's inauguration; indeed, it was partly at the queen's suggestion. However, it also had much to do with growing dislike of the "new" 1815 anthem. By this time, it had become even more controversial than the Wilhelmus had been, with Socialists refusing to sing it.

== Lyrics ==
=== Original version ===
Wien Neerlandsch bloed in de aders vloeit,
Van vreemde smetten vrij,
Wiens hart voor land en koning gloeit,
Verheff' den zang als wij:
Hij stell' met ons, vereend van zin,
Met onbeklemde borst,
Het godgevallig feestlied in
Voor vaderland en vorst.

De Godheid, op haar hemeltroon,
Bezongen en vereerd,
Houdt gunstig ook naar onzen toon
Het heilig oor gekeerd:
Zij geeft het eerst, na 't zalig koor,
Dat hooger snaren spant,
Het rond en hartig lied gehoor
Voor vorst en vaderland.

Stort uit dan, broeders, eens van zin,
Dien hoogverhoorden kreet;
Hij telt bij God een deugd te min,
Die land en vorst vergeet;
Hij gloeit voor mensch en broeder niet
In de onbewogen borst,
Die koel blijft bij gebed en lied
Voor vaderland en vorst.

Ons klopt het hart, ons zwelt het bloed,
Bij 't rijzen van dien toon:
Geen ander klinkt ons vol gemoed,
Ons kloppend hart zoo schoon:
Hier smelt het eerst, het dierst belang
Van allen staat en stand
Tot één gevoel in d'eigen zang
Voor vorst en vaderland.

Bescherm, o God! bewaak den grond,
Waarop onze adem gaat;
De plek, waar onze wieg op stond,
Waar eens ons graf op staat.
Wij smeeken van uw vaderhand,
Met diep geroerde borst,
Behoud voor 't lieve vaderland,
Voor vaderland en vorst.

Bescherm hem, God! bewaak zijn troon,
Op duurzaam regt gebouwd;
Blink' altoos in ons oog zijn kroon
Nog meer door deugd dan goud!
Steun Gij den scepter, dien hij torscht,
Bestier hem in zijn hand;
Beziel, o God! bewaar den vorst,
Den vorst en 't vaderland.

Van hier, van hier wat wenschen smeedt
Voor een van beide alleen:
Voor ons gevoel, in lief en leed,
Zijn land en koning één.
Verhoor, o God! zijn aanroep niet,
Wie ooit hen scheiden dorst,
Maar hoor het één, het eigen lied
Voor vaderland en vorst.

Dring' luid, van uit ons feestgedruisch,
Die beê uw hemel in:
Bewaar den vorst, bewaar zijn huis
En ons, zijn huisgezin.
Doe nog ons laatst, ons jongst gezang
Dien eigen wensch gestand:
Bewaar, o God! den koning lang
En 't lieve vaderland.

Volkslied, Hendrik Tollens

Translation:

Whoever has Dutch blood flowing in their veins,
Free of foreign blemishes;
Whose heart glows for king and country,
Rejoice in song as we do!
He sings with us, united in purpose,
At the top of his voice
This festive song, pleasing to God,
For fatherland and king (2x)

The divinity on her heavenly throne
Serenaded and honoured
Favourably disposed to our sound
Keeps the holy ear turned:
She sings first-rate, in conjunction with the heavenly choir
Operating on a higher plain
This full and hearty song
For King and fatherland (2x)

Pour out therefore, brethren, one in spirit,
the far high heard cry;
He to God has a virtue less,
Who forgets sovereign and country;
He burns not for man and brother
In his unmoved chest,
Who remains cool to prayer and song
For Fatherland and prince.

Our heart beats, swells our blood,
When this hymn is raised:
No other sound fills our minds,
Our beating heart with such beauty:
Here melts the firstmost and dearest worth
Of common wealth and weal
Into a single feeling by common song
For prince and Fatherland.

Protect, O God! guard the ground,
Upon we breath;
The place where our cradle stood,
Where yet our grave will stand.
We beg your father's hand,
Stirred deep in chest,
Conservation for the dear fatherland,
For Fatherland and prince.

Protect him, God! guard his throne;
Built on perpetual right;
May his crown ever dazzle our eye
Even more by virtue than gold!
Support the sceptre, which he bears,
Guide it in his hand;
Inspire, O God! Preserve the prince,
The prince and Fatherland.

Away! Away! Who forges plans
for one of them alone:
We feel, in weal and woe,
that country and king are one.
O God! Do not hear upon the call
of him who dares to separate them,
But listen to our common song
For Fatherland and prince.

May loudly, from our festive roar
This supplication enter your heaven
Preserve the monarch, preserve his House
And us, his family
Grant our wish by this very song
Preserve, oh Lord, for ever the King
And the dear fatherland (2x)

=== The changed version ===
Wien Neêrlandsch bloed door d'ad'ren vloeit,
Wien 't hart klopt fier en vrij,
Wie voor zijn volk van liefde gloeit,
Verheff' den zang als wij!
Hij roem' met allen, welgezind,
Den onverbreekb'ren band,
Die Neêrland en Oranje bindt:
Vorstin en Vaderland. (2x)

Bescherm, o God! bewaak den grond,
Waarop onze adem gaat,
De plek waar onze wieg op stond,
Wellicht ons sterfuur slaat.
Wij smeken van Uw Vaderhand,
Met blijden kinderzin,
Behoud voor 't lieve Vaderland,
Voor land en Koningin! (2x)

Dring' luid, van uit ons feestgedruisch
De beê Uw' hemel in:
„Blijv' met ons oud Oranjehuis
„Het volk steeds één gezin!”
Vorstin en Prins prijze onze zang,
En 't klinke aan allen kant:
„Bewaar het vorstlijk stamhuis lang
„En 't lieve Vaderland!” (2x)

Neêrlands Volkslied as modified by J. W. van Dalfsen

Translation:

Whoever has Dutch blood flowing in their veins,
Whose heart beats proud and free,
Who glows with love for his nation,
Rejoice in song as we do!
He praises with everyone, well-affected,
The indissoluble link
That binds the Netherlands to Orange,
To Queen and country (2x)

Protect, oh Lord, protect the ground
Whereupon we breathe
This place which held our cradle
Where perhaps our dying-hour will come
We beseech of Your father hand
With joyful childlike mind
Protection for the beloved fatherland
For Queen and country (2x)

Pervade loudly, from within our festive roar
This prayer unto heaven
Watch over our ancient House of Orange
The nation for ever one family
Queen and Prince praise our song
And sound it all around
Protect the Royal Dynasty for ever
And the beloved fatherland (2x)

=== Official versions ===
The national anthem had two official versions. The original version which was in use from 1815 to 1898 was written to honor a king. The second version which was in use from 1898 to 1932 was rewritten and used to honor Queen Wilhelmina.

==== Version used from 1815 to 1898 ====
Wien Neêrlands bloed in d'aders vloeit
Van vreemde smetten vrij
Wiens hart voor land en koning gloeit
Verheff' de zang als wij:
Hij zet met ons, vereend van zin
Met onbeklemde borst
Het godgevallig feestlied in
Voor vaderland en vorst (2x)

De Godheid, op haar hemeltroon
Bezongen en vereerd
Houdt gunstig ook naar onze toon
Het heilig oor gekeerd:
Zij geeft het eerst, na 't zalig koor
Dat hoger snaren spant
Het rond en hartig lied gehoor
Voor vorst en vaderland (2x)

Dring' luid, vanuit ons feestgedruis
Die beê den hemel in:
Bewaar de vorst, bewaar zijn huis
En ons, zijn huisgezin
Doe nog ons laatst, ons jongst gezang
Die eigen wens gestand:
Bewaar, o God den koning lang
En 't lieve vaderland (2x)

Translation:

Whoever has Dutch blood flowing in their veins,
Free of foreign blemishes;
Whose heart glows for king and country,
Rejoice in song as we do!
He sings with us, united in purpose,
At the top of his voice
This festive song, pleasing to God,
For fatherland and king (2x)

The divinity on her heavenly throne
Serenaded and honoured
Favourably disposed to our sound
Keeps the holy ear turned:
She sings first-rate, in conjunction with the heavenly choir
Operating on a higher plain
This full and hearty song
For King and fatherland (2x)

Pervade loudly, from within our festive roar
This prayer unto heaven
Protect the monarch, protect his House
And us, his family
Redeem your promise with the very same wish in our latest song
Protect, oh Lord, for ever the King
And the beloved fatherland (2x)

==== Version used from 1898 to 1932 ====
Wien Neêrlands bloed in de aadren vloeit
Wien 't hart klopt fier en vrij
Wie voor zijn volk van liefde gloeit
Verheff' de zang als wij:
Hij roem' met allen, welgezind
Den onverbreekb'ren band
Die Neerland en Oranje bindt
Vorstin en vaderland (2x)

Bescherm, o God, bewaakt den grond
Waarop onze adem gaat
De plek waar onze wieg op stond
Wellicht ons sterfuur slaat
Wij smeken van Uw vaderhand
Met blijden kinderzin
Behoud voor 't lieve vaderland
Voor land en koningin (2x)

Dring' luid, vanuit ons feestgedruis
De beê den hemel in:
Blijf met ons oud Oranjehuis
Het volk steeds één gezin
Vorstin en prins prijze ons gezang
En 't klinke aan allen kant:
Bewaar het vorstelijk stamhuis lang
En 't lieve vaderland (2x)

Translation:

Whoever has Dutch blood flowing in their veins,
Whose heart beats proud and free,
Who glows with love for his nation,
Rejoice in song as we do!
He praises with everyone, well-affected,
The indissoluble link
That binds the Netherlands to Orange,
To Queen and country (2x)

Protect, oh Lord, protect the ground
Whereupon we breathe
This place which held our cradle
Where perhaps our dying-hour will come
We beseech of Your father hand
With joyful childlike mind
Protection for the beloved fatherland
For Queen and country (2x)

Pervade loudly, from within our festive roar
This prayer unto heaven
Watch over our ancient House of Orange
The nation for ever one family
Queen and Prince praise our song
And sound it all around
Protect the Royal Dynasty for ever
And the beloved fatherland (2x)
