= Witzhelden =

Coordinates: 51°07′N 7°07′E

The coat of arms (Wappen) of the town of Witzhelden in North Rhine-Westphalia.

Witzhelden is a small town located in the district of Leichlingen near the cities of Düsseldorf, Solingen, and Cologne in the state of North Rhine-Westphalia in Germany.

== History ==
Witzhelden is part of the Rheinisch-Bergische Kreis a larger district that forms the western part of the Bergisches Land, where the hills of the Sauerland descend into the Rhine valley. From the Medieval era to the Napoleonic Wars (1100–1805), the Bergisches Land was the territory of the County (Grafschaft) and Duchy (Herzogtum) of Berg. Starting in 1816, the Rhineland provinces became districts of Prussia.

In 1150, a nobleman named Hemmersbach donated his estate to a Cistercian monastery at Hemmerod on the Mosel River. Pope Lucius III confirmed this transfer with a bull dated 11 October 1184 when the village, first mentioned, was known as Witseleden meaning the "home of Vito, or Wittrich". In 1235, the Cologne church records reference the town's "Church of Henricus" By 1560, the town was predominantly Lutheran.

== Notable residents ==
- Johann Wilhelm Wilms (1772–1847), German-Dutch composer
- Otto Adams (1887–1966), trade unionist, member of parliament
- Carl Hesselmann (1830–1902), noted teacher.
- Torsten Jansen (born 1976), athlete, Handball World Champion 2007, European Handball Champion 2004, Olympic Silver Medal 2004
