= Adrianus Valerius =

Dutch poet and composer

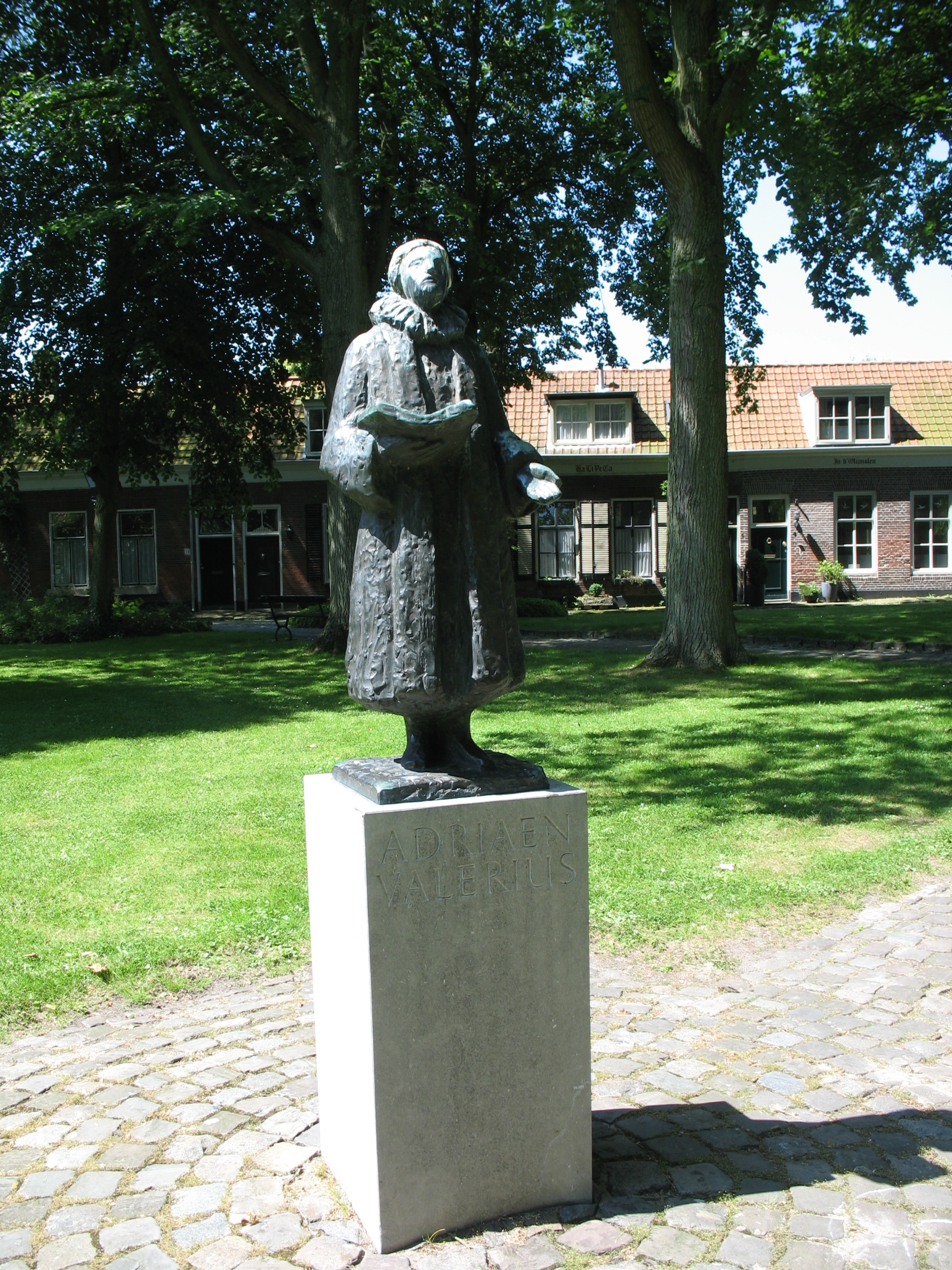
- (Valerius' statue in Veere)
- Born: c. 1575; Middelburg, County of Zeeland
- Died: 27 January 1625; Veere, Dutch Republic
- Known for: Poetry, music
- Notable work: Neder-landtsche gedenck-clanck (1626), containing: "Wilt heden nu treden" "Het Wilhelmus"(melody adapted) "Merck toch hoe sterck"

Adrianus Valerius, also known as Adriaen Valerius, (c. 1575 – 1625) was a Dutch poet and composer, known mostly for his poems dealing with peasant and burgher life and those dealing with the Dutch War of Independence, assembled in his great work Neder-landtsche gedenck-clanck.

== Life ==
Valerius was born about 1575 in Middelburg to an ethnic French notary, François Valéry. His father had a somewhat prosperous career as a notary and customs official and in 1592 obtained a position as Court Scribe to Pieter van Reigersbergh, the burgemeester (mayor) of the city of Veere in the province of Zeeland.

Six years later, Adriaen Valerius was named the Toll and Customs Controller for Veere, starting a prosperous career as both a burgher and a patrician of his city. Having married the burgemeester's daughter in 1605, he advanced to Tax Collections and later was appointed to the City Council.

== Work and influence ==
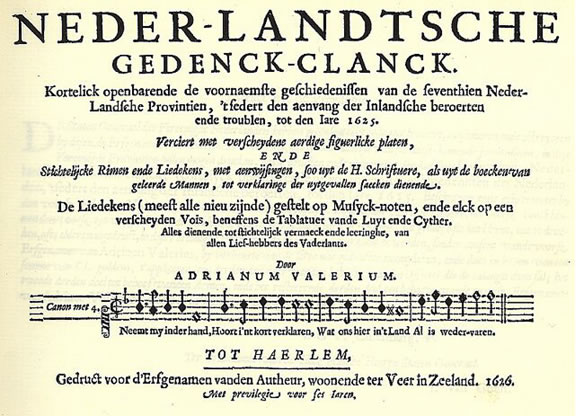
Adriaen Valerius, Neder-landtsche gedenck-clanck, published in Haarlem in 1626

A poet of not inconsiderable talent, Valerius worked on the great Zeelander compendium Zeeusche Nachtegael with a number of other poet-colleagues. The work would be published in 1623. His primary individual opus, on the other hand, is the collection of folk poems and melodies on the Dutch Wars (1555–1625) Neder-landtsche gedenck-clanck, which he had collected and edited for thirty years until his death in 1625. The posthumous collection, published by his son François in 1631, gained instant popularity. The work, steeped in Protestant moralization and chiliastic attitudes, was both anti-Catholic and anti-Spanish and was studied in Zeeland both at home and Church as part of familial religious edification. The collection contained 76 songs (including Wilhelmus, which became the Netherlands' national anthem), and unusually for the time the songs were printed in musical notation (many similar collections named well-known tunes to which a printed text should be sung). Musical accompaniments were to be done by four-stringed citterns and seven-stringed lutes; the accompaniments were printed in tablature.

Valerius' historical significance lies neither in his poetry's artistic expression, which was stunted and often bare, nor in the originality of his work, which is often viewed as derivative. Rather, his compendium served as a mirror on his time and mores, while the strong sense of Dutch nation and identity that permeate this collection would serve to make his work a popular favorite in the Netherlands in times of trouble (for example, during the German occupation of the Netherlands in the Second World War).

The German translation of his most familiar song Wilt heden nu treden (known in English as We Gather Together): Wir treten zum Beten or Altniederländisches Dankgebet (Old Dutch Thanksgiving Prayer), became a potent symbol of the "Throne and Altar" alliance of German civil religion until 1918. In the United States, it is popularly associated with Thanksgiving Day and is often sung at family meals and at religious services on that day, having been brought to America by Dutch settlers in New Amsterdam, now New York City.

== References and further reading ==
- Albert Clement: "Adriaen Valerius", Grove Music Online, ed. L. Macy (Accessed July 5, 2007), (subscription access)
