= Elisabeth Augustin =

German-Dutch writer (1903–2001)

Elisabeth Augustin (around 1941)

Elisabeth Augustin (13 June 1903 – 14 December 2001) was a German-Dutch writer.

The daughter of Eduard Joseph Glaser, a Roman Catholic, and Ella Cohn, a Jew, she was born Elisabeth Theresia Glaser in Friedenau, a suburb of Berlin, and grew up in Leipzig and Berlin. By the age of 20, she was writing poetry and short stories that were published in local newspapers. In 1933, she completed her first novel Der Ausgestoßene (The outcast); it was accepted for publication but was not released due to the political environment in Germany at the time. Later that year, she left for the Netherlands. Her husband, Paul Felix Augustin, had grown up there and she already spoke Dutch.

Her own Dutch translation of her first novel was published as De uitgestootene in 1935. She had published three more novels in Dutch by 1938. In 1938, her parents left Germany to join her in the Netherlands. However, after her father died in 1942, her mother was deported to the Sobibór extermination camp where she was murdered in the gas chambers.

Her later writing is strongly influenced by Judaism and the Holocaust, even though Augustin herself did not follow Jewish customs or the Jewish religion. She published the novel Labyrint (Dutch) in 1955. A German version Auswege appeared in 1988; it was to be her last novel, although she continued to produce poetry, short stories and radio plays.

In 1992, she was awarded the Jacobson award for her work.

She died in Amsterdam in 2001.

== Publication in English translation ==
- Elisabeth Augustin: The Elisabeth Augustin reader. Transl. by Robert Lyng et al.; introd. by M.H. Würzner. Krimpen aan den IJssel, Proza Press, 1978. ISBN 90-6286-561-5
