= Pieter Cornelis Boutens =

Dutch poet, classicist, and mystic (1870–1943)

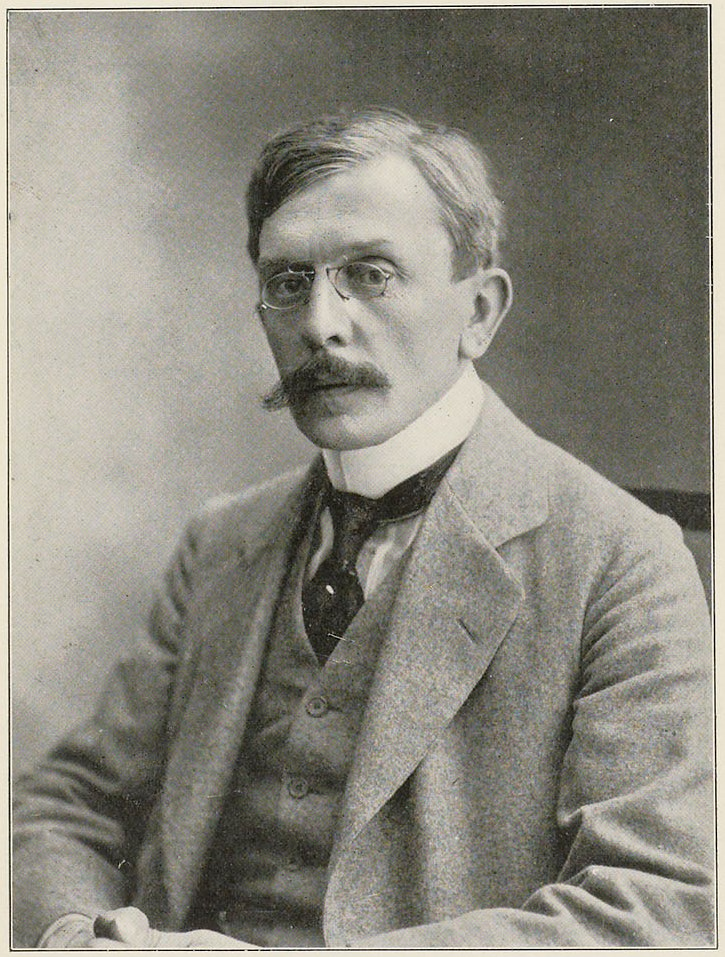
- Born: Pieter Cornelis Bouters; February 20, 1870; Middelburg
- Died: March 14, 1943 (aged 73); The Hague

Pieter Cornelis Boutens (February 20, 1870 – March 14, 1943) was a Dutch poet, classicist, and mystic.

== Biography ==
Boutens was born in Middelburg. He grew up in Zeeland in a strict, Protestant middle-class environment. After finishing the Gymnasium Middelburg, he began to study classical languages in 1890 at the University of Utrecht, and graduated in 1899 on a study of the Greek comedy writer Aristophanes.

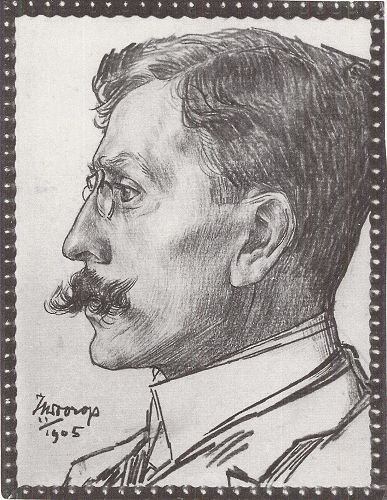
Portrait by Jan Toorop (1905)

His debut as a poet was the Utrecht Student Almanac in 1891. His early work was inspired by the verses of Herman Gorter; later sources of inspiration were Plato, Sappho and the Bible. Boutens' style became based on the idea of achieving a "higher reality". In the course of 45 years, he published some 20 volumes of poetry, but also a large number of translations of Ancient Greek (i.a. Ilias and Odyssey), Persian, French, German and English poets.

In 1894 he accepted the post of teacher of classical languages at the Noorthey boarding school for boys in Voorschoten, at the time a renowned institute for young people from aristocratic families. After a physical collapse in 1904 and a subsequent holiday in Tyrol, he settled in The Hague, where he earned his living by private tuition and the financial support of some aristocratic friends he had met at Noorthey.

Boutens became a member of the Association of Writers (founded in 1905), and became its president in 1918. In the last year of his life, during the German occupation in World War II, he also became a member of the Gleichschaltung professional artists' association, the Nederlandsche Kultuurkamer. This taint did not hinder his posthumous fame as a poet and translator: his voluminous collected works were successively published in seven volumes from 1943-1954. In the 1980s his homosexuality was disclosed. A volume of poetry about homosexual love he had published in 1919 as a work of a poet who had prematurely died, the Strofen van Andries de Hoghe turned out to be Boutens's own work.

Boutens died in 1943 in The Hague, 73 years old.

== Works ==
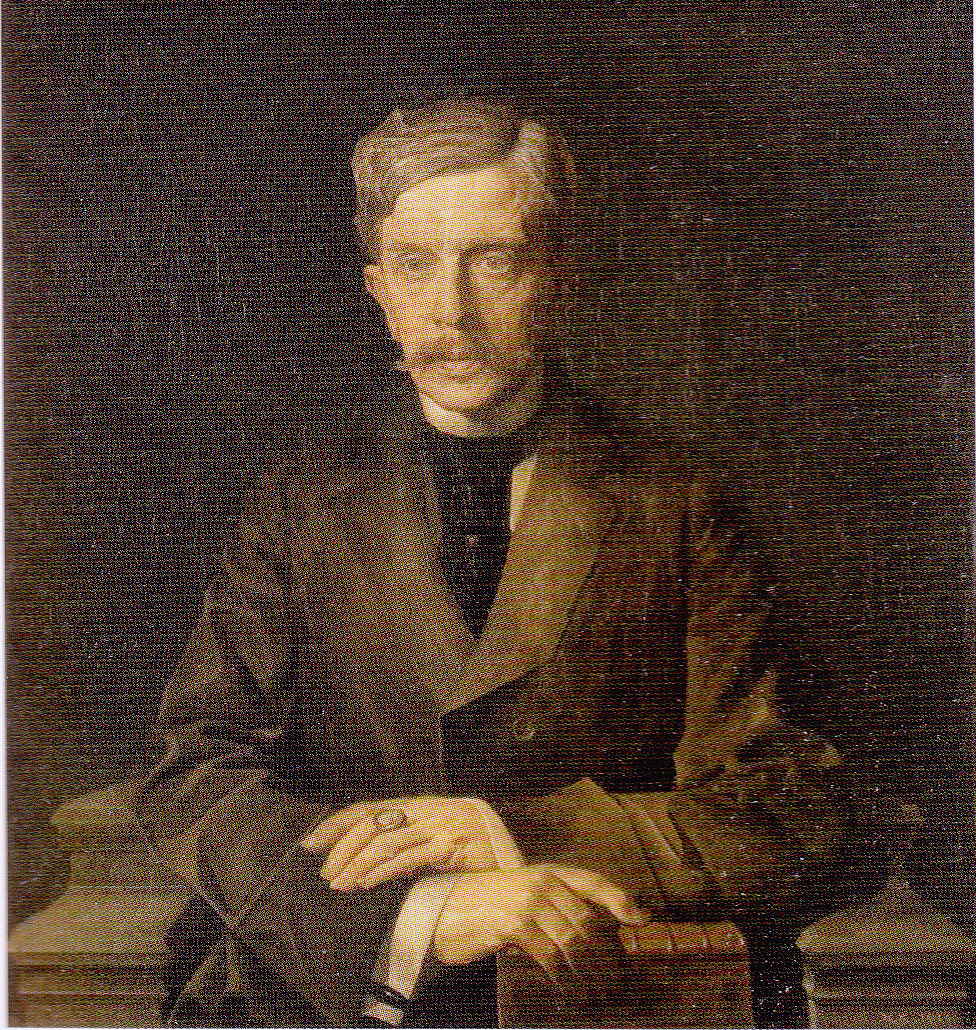
Portrait of Boutens (1914) by Willem van Konijnenburg

- 1898 - Verzen
- 1902 - Praeludiën
- 1904 - Naenia
- 1907 - Stemmen
- 1908 - Beatrijs
- 1908 - Spel van Platoons leven
- 1909 - Vergeten liedjes (Forgotten songs)
- 1910 - Alianora
- 1912 - Carmina
- 1916 - Lente-maan
- 1919 - Strophen uit de nalatenschap van Andries de Hoghe
- 1920 - Sonnetten
- 1921 - Liederen van Isoude
- 1922 - Zomerwolken (Summer Clouds)
- 1926 - De sonnetten van Louise Labé (The Sonnets of Louise Labé)
- 1930 - Oud-Perzische kwatrijnen
- 1931 - Bezonnen verzen
- 1932 - Honderd Hollandsche kwatrijnen
- 1932 - Strophen en andere verzen uit de nalatenschap van Andries de Hoghe
- 1942 - Tusschenspelen
- 1942 - Gegeven keur
- 1943-1954 - Verzameld werk (Collected works) seven volumes, published after his death

== Awards ==
- 1913 - Tollens Prize for Lifetime Achievement
- 1914 - Nieuwe Gids-prijs for Carmina
- 1925 - Award for Mastery for Zomerwolken
