= Tollens-Fonds =

Dutch literary organization

The Tollens-Fonds ("Tollens foundation)" is a Dutch organization named for poet Hendrik Tollens (1780–1856). The organization awards a notable literary prize, the Tollens Prize and till 2008 also the Jacobson Prize.

== Tollens Prize ==
The Tollens Prize (Dutch: Tollensprijs) is a quinquennial award in the Netherlands designed to provide a five prominent literary honor. The prize is awarded for a body of work that, in the opinion of the jury, had the highest literary value in the preceding five years.

The award, established by the Board of Tollensfonds in 1902, is called the Tollensprijs since 1925. It was named after the poet Hendrik Tollens (1780–1856).

=== Winners ===
- 2022 - Ellen Deckwitz
- 2015 - Hans Dorrestijn
- 2010 - Paulien Cornelisse
- 2005 - Jules Deelder
- 2000 - Heinz Hermann Polzer (Drs. P)
- 1992 - Marten Toonder
- 1988 - Koos Schuur
- 1983 - Belcampo
- 1978 - Michel van der Plas
- 1973 - Anton Koolhaas
- 1968 - F.C. Terborgh
- 1963 - Ina Boudier-Bakker
- 1958 - Maria Dermoût
- 1953 - Bertus Aafjes
- 1948 - H.W.J.M. Keuls
- 1943 - J.W.F. Werumeus Buning
- 1938 - Herman de Man
- 1933 - Arthur van Schendel
- 1928 - R. van Genderen Stort
- 1923 - Louis Couperus
- 1918 - Willem Kloos
- 1918 - Jacobus van Looy
- 1913 - P.C. Boutens
- 1913 - Lodewijk van Deyssel
- 1908 - Carel Scharten and Margo Scharten-Antink
- 1903 - G. van Hulzen

== Jacobson award ==
Named for Jos. Jacobson, this award is given every three years to an "elderly" writer or critic, often for their entire oeuvre.

=== Winners ===
- 2008 - Carel Peeters
- 2002 - S. Dresden
- 1992 - Elisabeth Augustin
- 1990 - Jan de Hartog
- 1985 - Han G. Hoekstra
- 1985 - Eric van der Steen
- 1980 - Henriëtte van Eyk
- 1980 - Jeanne van Schaik-Willing
- 1975 - Annie Solomons
- 1975 - J. C. van Schagen
- 1970 - Willem Brandt
- 1965 - Elisabeth Zernike
- 1960 - Marie Schmitz
- 1955 - Kees van Bruggen
- 1950 - J. van Oudshoorn
- 1945 - Frans Bastiaanse
- 1940 - G. van Hulzen
- 1940 - J. K. Rensburg
- 1935 - Maurits Wagenvoort
- 1930 - F. Smit Kleine
- 1925 - Nine van der Schaaf
