= Johann Wilhelm Wilms =

Dutch-German composer (1772–1847)

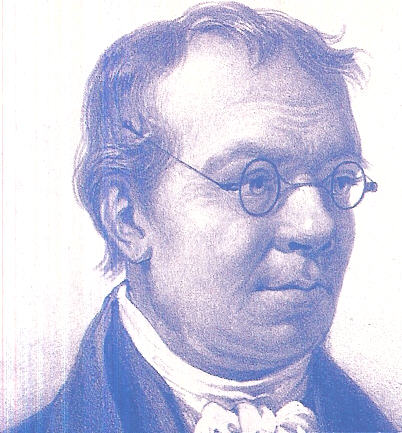
Johann Wilhelm Wilms (1772-1847)

Johann Wilhelm Wilms (March 30, 1772 (baptized) – July 19, 1847) was a Dutch-German composer, best known for setting the poem Wien Neêrlands Bloed to music, which served as the Dutch national anthem from 1817 to 1932.

== Biography ==
Wilms was born in Witzhelden, a small town near Solingen. After receiving lessons from his father and oldest brother in piano and composition, Wilms studied flute on his own. He moved to Amsterdam in 1791 where he played the flute in two orchestras and was soloist in Mozart and Beethoven piano concertos, giving them their Dutch premieres. Here, he also received further instruction in musical theory from the Saxony-born composer Georg Casper Hodermann (1740-1802).

Around 1793, his first composition was published, a sonata for keyboard (harpsichord or possibly fortepiano), which is lost. Three years later, Wilms was one of the six founders of the society Eruditio Musica, which organised concerts at which he was active as pianist and composer.

He taught piano at the Koninklijk Nederlandsch Instituut voor Wetenschappen (the precursor of the present Royal Netherlands Academy of Arts and Sciences) after it was founded by the first King of Holland, Louis Napoleon. He soon became a valued member of his adoptive nation's musical community, interviewing applicants for church organist positions, judged composition competitions and wrote for the Allgemeine musikalische Zeitung, a publication he once used as a soapbox to complain about the lack of performance of music by contemporary Dutch composers like himself.

He received many commissions from wealthy Amsterdam music lovers. His work also became known outside Amsterdam, with his fourth symphony being premiered in Leipzig. However, Wilms could not live from composing alone and also had to remain active as a performing musician and music teacher. However, in December 1805 he married Nicoletta Theodora Versteegh, the daughter of a wealthy art collector, which improved his financial situation as well.

As the events of the French Revolution affected the Netherlands, Wilms wrote several patriotic hymns. However, following the fall of Napoleon and the return of the House of Orange to power, Wilms in 1816 won the open competition for the new Dutch anthem with Wien Neêrlands Bloed (with lyrics by Hendrik Tollens). It became the official Dutch national anthem from 1817 to 1932. At the same contest, he also won the prize for a "cheerful anthem" with "Wij leven vrij, wij leven blij" to lyrics by J. Brand van Cabauw. These awards led to an increase in commissions by churches and other organisations. In 1820, he won a composition competition of the Ghent Society of Fine Artswith his sixth symphony in D minor, Op. 58. This was also his last major orchestral work to be published.

His wife died in the summer of 1821, a few weeks after a miscarriage. The following year, he lost a two-and-a-half-year-old daughter. He then largely withdrew from public musical life and became organist of the Mennonite congregation "Het Lam" in Amsterdam in 1823. From then on, he mainly composed works for occasions, such as an annual cantata for the philanthropic Maatschappij tot Nut van 't Algemeen.

After 1823, he restricted himself to composing and publishing piano variations and songs (with a patriotic character at the time of the Belgian revolution of 1830). His works were performed less and less, and in 1841 he resigned as a member of the Amsterdam Maatschappij tot Bevordering der Toonkunst, of which he had been co-founder in 1829.

From 1845, he gradually lost his eyesight and had to be replaced as organist more often by one of his pupils. He died in Amsterdam in 1847.

== Legacy ==
In 2003, the International Johann Wilhelm Wilms Society (German: Johann Wilhelm Wilms Gesellschaft) was established in Bonn.

== Recordings ==
A sonata by Wilms was recorded in the early nineteenth century on a cylinder for an automatic organ (present in the current Geelvinck Pianola Museum in Amsterdam).

Wilms' Symphony No. 6 in D minor and Symphony No. 7 in C minor, were recorded in 2003 by Concerto Köln for Deutsche Grammophon on period instruments.

In 2006, Netherlands Radio Chamber Orchestra conducted by Anthony Halstead made a 2 CD recording of Wilms' Symphonies No. 3-6 alongside his Variations on "Wilhelmus Van Nassauwe" for Challenge Classics.

The German label cpo started a recording project of Wilms' works in 2009 with the Symphonies No. 1 and No. 4 and the Overture in D major. They were played by NDR Radiophilharmonie conducted by Howard Griffiths. However, until 2024 it was the only recording of Wilms' orchestral works on cpo.

Kölner Akademie led by Michael Alexander Willens with Ronald Brautigam, piano, recorded all 5 piano concertos by Wilms on period instruments. The 2 CDs were released in 2022 by BIS. Earlier in 2007, Kölner Akademie made a recording of Wilms' Symphony No. 3, Piano Concerto No. 2 and Flute Concerto for German label Ars Produktion.

In 2024, cpo released a recording of Symphony No. 6, the overtures in E flat major and F minor, and the Concert Overtures in E major and E flat major, played by Munich Radio Orchestra under the baton of Ivan Repušić.

The piano quartets in C major and F major were also recorded in 2019 by Valentin Klavierquartett for cpo. Later in 2023, a period instrument recording was made by G.A.P. Ensemble for Brilliant Classics, which also includes Wilms' piano trio.

== Selected list of works ==
=== Symphonies ===
Wilms wrote seven symphonies. His symphony in F major (No. 2) was lost and the others sank into obscurity after his death. The chronology of the five early symphonies is not clear even to experts. The seventh symphony was long assumed to be lost, but its first performance took place in Brussels in 2002)

- Symphony No. 1 in C major, Op. 9 (c. 1806)
- Symphony No. 2 in F major, Op. 10 (c. 1808, lost)
- Symphony No. 3 in E♭ major, Op. 14 (c. 1808)
- Symphony No. 4 in C minor, Op. 23 (c. 1812)
- Symphony No. 5 in D major, Op. 52 (c. 1817)
- Symphony No. 6 in D minor, Op. 58 (c. 1823)
- Symphony No. 7 in C minor (c. 1836)

=== Overtures ===
- Overture L'éloge des arts, Op. 45 (1814)
- Tragic Overture (1814)
- Overture for winds (1817)
- Ouverture à grand orchestre in E♭ major (c. 1830)(edited by B. Hagels and published in 2006)
- Ouverture à grand orchestre in F minor (c. 1830)
- Ouverture à grand orchestre in D major (c. 1830)
- Concert-Ouverture à grand orchestre in E♭ major (c. 1830)
- Overture to the 50th anniversary of the 'Maatschappij tot Nut van 't Algemeen' (1834)
- Concert-Ouverture à grand orchestre in E major (1844)

=== Piano Concertos ===
- Harpsichord Concerto in E major, Op. 3 ("Piano Concerto No. 1", 1799)
- Fortepiano Concerto in C major, Op. 12 ("Piano Concerto No. 2", 1807)
- Fortepiano Concerto in D major, Op. 26 ("Piano Concerto No. 3", 1810)
- Fortepiano Concerto F major, Op. 32 ("Piano Concerto No. 4", 1813)
- Fortepiano Concerto in E major ("Piano Concerto No. 5", 1815)
- Fortepiano Concerto in E♭ major, Op. 55 ("Piano Concerto No. 6", 1819)
- Fortepiano Concerto ("Piano Concerto No. 7", 1823)

=== Other Concertante Works ===
- Bassoon Concerto (c. 1808)
- Cello Concerto (c. 1812)
- Flute Concerto in D major, Op. 24 (c. 1813)
- Variations on Wilhelmus van Nassouwe for flute, clarinet, bassoon, violin and cello, Op. 37 (1814)
- Concertante for flute, clarinet, bassoon, violin and cello in C major (1814)
- Concertante for flute, oboe (or clarinet), bassoon and horn in F major, Op. 35, (1814)
- Concertante for clarinet in B♭, Op. 40 (1814-1815)
- Andante and Polonaise for bassoon (1814-1815)
- Variations on Wilhelmus van Nassouwe for cello and orchestra (1815)
- Variations on Wien Neêrlands bloed for flute, clarinet, oboe, bassoon, violin and cello, Op. 57 (1820)
- Cello Concerto (c. 1821)
- Variations for Fortepiano and orchestra on the Air di tanti Palpiti from Tancredi by Rossini (1822)
- Concertante for two clarinets (1827-28)

=== Chamber Music ===
- Three Violin Sonatas, Opus 21
- Piano Quartet in C major, Opus 22 (1808)
- Piano Quartet in F major, Op. 30 (1812)
- Two String Quartets (in G minor (c. 1806) and A major), Opus 25. Published in 2007.
- Flute Sonata in D, Opus 33 (1813)

=== Piano Music ===
- Sonata in D major for Piano Four-Hands, Opus 7 (1800)
- Piano Sonata in B♭ major, Opus 13 (1808)
- Sonata in C major for Piano Four-Hands, Opus 31 (1813)
- Variations on Unser alter Staatsverwalter in D major, Op. 34
- Variations on Wilhelmus van Nassauwe in D major, Op. 37
- Sonata in B♭ for Piano Four-Hands, Opus 41 (ca. 1813)
- The Battle of Waterloo, Op. 43 (1815)
- Variations on Partant pour la Syrie in F major, Op. 53
- Variations on Seit ich so viele Weiber sah in F major

=== Songs ===
- Wien Neêrlandsch bloed

== Bibliography ==
- Jan ten Bokum: "Wilms, Johann Wilhelm", in The New Grove Dictionary of Music and Musicians, ed. S. Sadie and J. Tyrrell (London: Macmillan, 2001), ISBN 1-56159-239-0.
- Barry S. Brook & Barbara B. Heyman (editors): The Symphony: 1720–1840, series C, volume 13 (New York: Garland Publishing, 1986), ISBN 0-8240-3860-6.
