= We Gather Together =

Dutch Christian hymn celebrating military victory

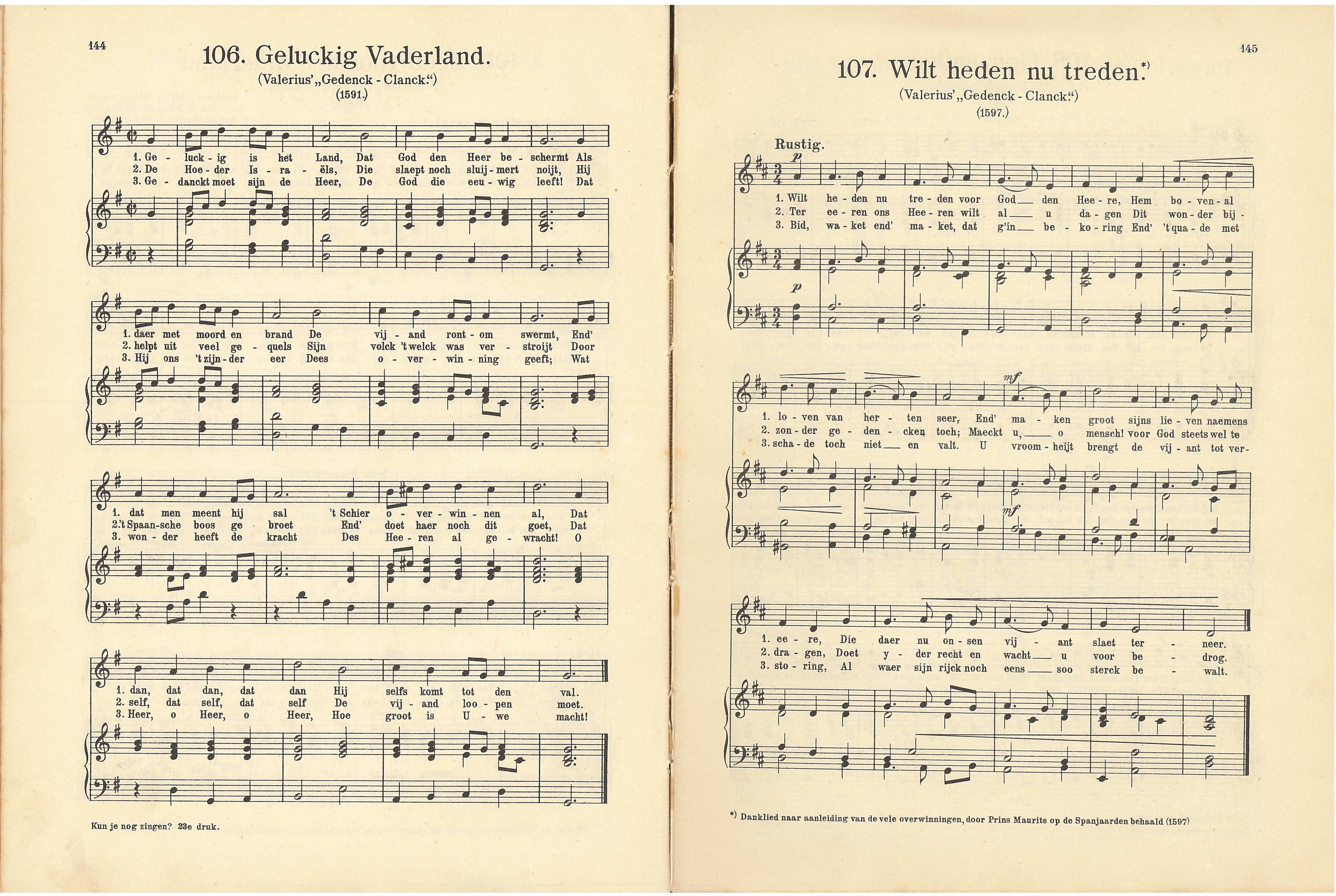
- Wilt heden nu treden, pagina 145
- Native name: Wilt heden nu treden
- Occasion: Thanksgiving
- Text: Adrianus Valerius
- Language: Dutch

"We Gather Together" is a Christian hymn of Dutch origin written in 1597 by Adrianus Valerius as "Wilt heden nu treden" to celebrate the Dutch victory over Spanish forces in the Battle of Turnhout. It was originally set to a Dutch folk tune. In the United States, it is popularly associated with Thanksgiving Day and is often sung at family meals and at religious services on that day.

== History ==
At the time the hymn was written, the Dutch were engaged in a war of national liberation against the Catholic King Philip II of Spain. "Wilt heden nu treden", "We gather together" resonated because under the Spanish King, Dutch Protestants were forbidden to gather for worship. The hymn first appeared in print in a 1626 collection of Dutch folk and patriotic songs, Neder-landtsche Gedenck-Clanck by Adriaen Valerius.

In anglophone hymnology, the tune is known as "Kremser", from Eduard Kremser's 1877 score arrangement and lyric translation of "Wilt heden nu treden" into Latin and German. The modern English text was written by Theodore Baker in 1894.

According to the Hymn Society in the United States and Canada, "We Gather Together"'s first appearance in an American hymnal was in 1903. It had retained popularity among the Dutch, and when the Dutch Reformed Church in North America decided in 1937 to abandon the policy that they had brought with them to the New World in the 17th century of singing only psalms and add hymns to the church service, "We Gather Together" was chosen as the first hymn in the first hymnal.

A different translation under the first line We Praise Thee, O God, Our Redeemer, Creator was translated by J. B. C. Cory (1882–1963).

The hymn steadily gained popularity, especially in services of Thanksgiving on such occasions as town and college centennial celebrations. According to Carl Daw, executive director of the Hymn Society, the "big break" came in 1935 when it was included in the national hymnal of the Methodist-Episcopal Church.

According to Michael Hawn, professor of sacred music at Southern Methodist University's Perkins School of Theology, "by World War I, we started to see ourselves in this hymn", and the popularity increased during World War II, when "the wicked oppressing" were understood to include Nazi Germany and Imperial Japan.

This hymn is often sung at American churches the Sunday before Thanksgiving.

This hymn was sung at the Opening of the Funeral Mass for Jacqueline Kennedy Onassis. The West Wing episode "Shibboleth" (season 2, episode 8) alluded to the hymn, and it is played in the episode's final scene (performed by the Cedarmont Kids).

The hymn is also usually sung by the Quartermaine family on the American soap opera General Hospital's annual Thanksgiving episode.

== Lyrics ==
Note that the English lyrics do not translate the Dutch. The Dutch third stanza is in the republishing 1871 only in the footnote on page 41, not in the sheet, because it was not good enough. Therefore, it is not in all lyrics.

Valerius, 1626
Dutch original

Wilt heden Nu treden Voor God den Heere;
Hem boven Al loven,, Van herten seer,,
End’ maken groot syns lieven naemens eere,
Die daer nu onsen vyand slaet ter neer.

Ter eeren,, ons Heeren,, Wilt al u dagen,
Dit wonder,, bysonder,, gedencken toch.
Maeckt u o mensch! voor God steets wel te dragen,
Doet yder recht, en wacht u voor bedrog.

D’arg-losen,, den boosen,, om yet te vinden,
Loopt driesschen, En briesschen gelyck een Leeu,
Soeckende wie hy wreedelyck verslinden,
Of geven mocht een doodelycke preeu.

Bid, waket,, End’ maket, Dat g’in bekoring,
End’ ’tquade,, Met schade,, Toch niet en valt.
U vroomheyt brengt de vyand tot verstoring,
Alwaer syn ryck noch eens soo sterck bewalt.

Theodore Baker, 1894

Verse 1:
We gather together to ask the Lord's blessing;
He chastens and hastens His will to make known.
The wicked oppressing now cease from distressing.
Sing praises to His Name; He forgets not His own.

Verse: 2
Beside us to guide us, our God with us joining,
Ordaining, maintaining His kingdom divine;
So from the beginning the fight we were winning;
Thou, Lord, were at our side, all glory be Thine!

Verse 3:
We all do extol Thee, Thou Leader triumphant,
And pray that Thou still our Defender will be.
Let Thy congregation escape tribulation;
Thy Name be ever praised! O Lord, make us free!

Paul Sjolund, 1984
additional verse added in "Festival Hymn of Thanksgiving" arrg.
Verse 4:
With voices United, our praises we offer,
To thee in thanksgiving, glad anthems we raise.
Thy strong arm will guide us,
For thou art beside us,
to Father, Son, and Spirit, forever be praised!

—

Julia Bulkley Cady (1882–1963), 1902

We praise thee, O God, our Redeemer, Creator,
In grateful devotion our tribute we bring.
We lay it before thee, we kneel and adore thee,
We bless thy holy name, glad praises we sing.

We worship thee, God of our fathers, we bless thee;
[... complete 3 stanza]

Herman Brueckner (1866–1942), 1918?
Translation of Joseph Weyl, 1877

Catholic Version:

We gather together to sing the Lord’s praises
To worship the Father through Jesus, His Son.
In this celebration
All sing with jubilation.
We are His holy people whose freedom He won.

We greet our Lord present within this assembly
To hear His good news announced clearly to all.
Our priest is presiding
In Christ we are abiding
As we invoke God’s blessing and answer His call

Jehovah's Witnesses Version

We gather to worship Jehovah, the righteous,
Who verily sitteth in Judgment severe;
The good by the evil shall not overpowered,
The Lord will prevent it, our prayer He will hear.

Amid the great conflict He ever stood by us,
[... complete 3 stanza] (There are also mixed versions with Baker)

As Sung in the Congregational Church in Connecticut in the 1950s:

Verse 3

We all do extol thee our leader in Battle And pray that thou still our defender wilt be. Let thy congregation escape tribulation. Thy name be ever praised, and thy people be free.

== Literature ==
- Valerius, Adrianus; Loman, Abraham Dirk; von Hellwald, Ferdinand Heller (1871), Oud-Nederlandsche Liederen uit den "Nederlandtschen Gedenck-clank" (in Dutch and German), Utrecht: Luis Roothaan, pp. 40–41, 72, sheet music: 12 (complete: 93)
