= Wenn alle untreu werden =

Song
- Language: German
- Written: 1814
- Composer: based on a French hunting song
- Lyricist: Max von Schenkendorf

"Wenn alle untreu werden, so bleiben wir doch treu" ("If all become unfaithful, we remain loyal") is the opening line of a famous patriotic German popular song written by Max von Schenkendorf in 1814. Schenkendorf dedicated the song to Friedrich Ludwig Jahn for the Holy Roman Empire. In older songbooks, the song is usually titled "Erneuter Schwur" ("Renewed Oath").

The melody was a slightly modified form of "Pour aller à la chasse faut être matineux", a French hunting song dating from 1724.

The title also refers to a German hymn of the same name, written by the German poet Novalis in 1799. The first two lines of this hymn are the same as in Schenkendorf's song.

== Nazi and far-right use ==
Gerhard Roßbach included the song in the activities of his German Youth Movement in which "its emphasis on loyalty in adversity and faith in Germany precisely fit Roßbach's desire to unify conservative forces behind a project of political and cultural renewal." During the Third Reich the song was used extensively by the Nazi SS, and became known as Treuelied (song of faithfulness). It sparked controversy in 2024, when it was sung at a funeral by members of the far-right Freedom Party of Austria.

== Lyrics ==
Wenn alle untreu werden, so bleiben wir doch treu,
dass immer noch auf Erden für euch ein Fähnlein sei,
Gefährten unsrer Jugend, ihr Bilder bessrer Zeit,
die uns zu Männertugend, und Liebestod geweiht.

Wollt nimmer von uns weichen, uns immer nahe sein,
treu, wie die deutschen Eichen, wie Mond und Sonnenschein!
Einst wird es wieder helle in aller Brüder Sinn,
sie kehren zu der Quelle in Lieb und Reue hin.

Es haben wohl gerungen die Helden dieser Frist,
und nun der Sieg gelungen, übt Satan neue List.
Doch wie sich auch gestalten im Leben mag die Zeit,
du sollst uns nicht veralten, o Traum der Herrlichkeit.

Ihr Sterne, seid uns Zeugen, die ruhig niederschaun,
wenn alle Brüder schweigen und falschen Götzen traun:
wir wolln das Wort nicht brechen und Buben werden gleich,
wolln predigen und sprechen von Kaiser und von Reich!

Translation:

If all become unfaithful, we remain loyal
so that there will always be a battalion for you on Earth.
Comrades of our youth, you pictures of a better time
that consecrates us to manly virtue and a death for love's sake.

Never leave us, always be close to us,
loyal like German oaks, like moon and sunshine!
Once it will again be bright in all brothers' minds,
and they will return to the source in love and regret.

This grace have the heroes well wrested,
and now, as victory is ours, Satan practices new treachery.
Yet, come what may in our life,
you, o dream of glory, shall never grow old on us.

You stars looking down calmly, be our witnesses,
when all brothers fall silent and trust in false idols:
we will never break our word, never become villains,
we will preach and speak of Kaiser and of Empire.

== Melody ==
In 1923, Walther Hensel set the lyrics to a melody borrowed from the Dutch national anthem "Wilhelmus". This melody is also used in Heino's interpretation of the song on his 1980 album Die schönsten deutschen Heimat- und Vaterlandslieder ("The Most Beautiful German Homeland and Patriotic Songs").
