= Stadtholderless Period =

In the history of the Republic of the Seven United Netherlands there were two periods when no governor was appointed by the provinces of Holland, Zeeland, Utrecht, Gelderland and Overijssel:

- First Stadtholderless period (1650–1672)
- Second Stadtholderless period (1702–1747)
