= Hendrik Tollens =

Dutch poet (1780–1856)

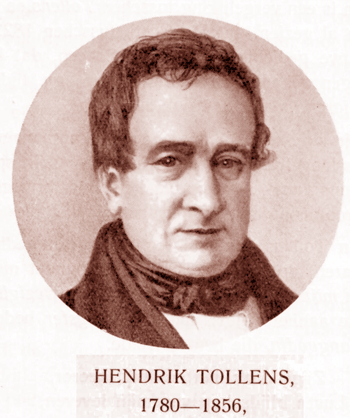
- Born: Hendricus Franciscus Caroluszoon Tollens; 24 September 1780; Rotterdam
- Died: 31 October 1856 (aged 76); Rijswijk
- Occupation: poet
- Known for: Wien Neêrlands Bloed, the national anthem of the Netherlands between 1815 and 1932

Henricus Franciscus Caroluszoon (Hendrik) Tollens (24 September 1780 – 31 October 1856) was a Dutch poet best known for Wien Neêrlands Bloed, the national anthem of the Netherlands between 1815 and 1932.

The Tollens Prize is named after him.

== Works ==
- Gedichten (1808)
- Idyllen en minnezangen (1801–1805)
- Konstanten: ein Trauerspiel
- Laatste gedichten (1848–1853)
- Nieuve gedichten (1821)
- Romanzen, balladen en legenden (1818)
- Tafereel van de overwintering der Nederlanders op Nova Zembla in de jaren 1596 en 1597 (1816)
