= List of Dutch women writers =

This is a list of women writers born in the Netherlands, or whose writings are closely associated with it.

== A ==
- Jo van Ammers-Küller (1884–1966), interwar novelist and non-fiction writer
- Threes Anna (born 1959), novelist, live performance producer and film director
- Simone Atangana Bekono (born 1991), novelist and poet

== B ==
- Maria Barnas (born 1973), novelist, poet and essayist
- Marjolein Bastin (born 1943), children's writer and illustrator
- Beatrice of Nazareth (1200–1268), prioress and author of early Dutch prose work Van seven manieren van heiliger minnen (Seven Ways of Holy Love)
- Thea Beckman (1923–2004), children's writer
- Nel Benschop (1918–2005), poet
- Carli Biessels (1936–2016), children's writer
- Anna Blaman (1905–1960), poet and novelist
- Marion Bloem (born 1952), Indo (Dutch/East Indian) novelist, non-fiction writer and documentary film producer
- Louise Sophie Blussé (1801–1896), non-fiction writer
- Anna Louisa Geertruida Bosboom-Toussaint (1812–1886), novelist
- Anneke Brassinga (born 1948), poet, prose writer and translator
- Til Brugman (1888–1958), poet, novelist and translator
- Andreas Burnier (1931–2002), poet, novelist and active feminist

== C ==
- Isabelle de Charrière (1740–1805), correspondent, novelist and playwright writing in French
- Willy Corsari (1897–1998), novelist, actress, comédienne and composer

== D ==
- Aagje Deken (1741–1804), poet and correspondent
- Maria Dermoût (1888–1962), novelist; author of The Ten Thousand Things
- Thea Doelwijt (born 1938), journalist, novelist and playwright
- Renate Dorrestein (1954–2018), journalist and novelist
- Tonke Dragt (1930–2024), children's writer and illustrator; author of De brief voor de Koning (Letter for the King)
- Jessica Durlacher (born 1961), critic, columnist and novelist

== E ==
- Anna Enquist (born 1945), poet and novelist
- Henrica van Erp (c. 1480 – 1548), abbess and author of her monastery's Chronicle

== F ==
- Anne Frank (1929–1945), author of The Diary of a Young Girl and Holocaust victim

== G ==
- Ida Gerhardt (1905–1997), poet
- Hermine de Graaf (1951–2013), fiction writer
- Els de Groen (born 1949), politician, novelist and non-fiction writer
- Wies van Groningen (née Louise Metaal) (1929–2022), Moluccan Dutch writer and story collector

== H ==
- Francisca de Haan (fl. 1998 onwards), historian of gender studies
- Hella Haasse (1918–2011), novelist with some works set in the East Indies
- Judith Herzberg (born 1934), poet and playwright
- Nienke van Hichtum (1860–1939), children's writer in West Frisian and Dutch
- Etty Hillesum (1914–1943), diarist and correspondent during the German occupation of Amsterdam
- Rozalie Hirs (born 1965), poet and composer
- Marjolijn Hof (born 1956), novelist with some works translated into English
- Xaviera Hollander (born 1943), call girl and memoirist
- Maria Aletta Hulshoff (1781–1846), feminist writer
- Cornélie Huygens (1848–1902), feminist activist and columnist

== I ==
- Marith Iedema (born 1989), journalist and documentarian

== K ==
- Marie Kessels (born 1954), poet and prose writer
- Yvonne Keuls (born 1931), Indo writer and novelist
- Yvonne Kroonenberg (born 1950), psychologist, columnist and author of works about men
- Mina Kruseman (1839–1922), feminist and non-fiction writer
- Gerdina Hendrika Kurtz (1899–1989), historical writer
- Emy Koopman (born 1985), video and print journalist, bibliotherapy researcher and scholar

== L ==
- Astrid Lampe (born 1955), poet and actress
- Katharyne Lescailje (1649–1711), poet and translator
- Noni Lichtveld (1929–2017), children's writer and illustrator based in Suriname
- Johanna Dorothea Lindenaer (1664–1737), memoirist and translator
- Tessa de Loo (born 1946), novelist
- Emilie Luzac (1748–1788), correspondent

== M ==
- Jetske Reinou van der Malen (1681–1752), poet
- Cissy van Marxveldt (1889–1948), children's writer
- Dora van der Meiden-Coolsma (1918–2001), columnist and children's writer
- Clara Meijers (1885–1964), feminist writer
- Vonne van der Meer (born 1952), fiction writer and playwright
- Doeschka Meijsing (1947–2012), novelist
- Hanny Michaelis (1922–2007), poet
- Marga Minco (1920–2023), journalist and novelist
- Marente de Moor (born 1972), novelist and columnist
- Mieke Mosmuller (born 1951), fiction and non-fiction writer in Dutch and German
- Mirjam Mous (born 1963), author of children's literature
- Marian Mudder (born 1958), columnist and non-fiction writer
- Charlotte Mutsaers (born 1942), prose writer and essayist

== N ==
- Saskia Noort (born 1967), crime-fiction writer and journalist

== P ==
- Connie Palmen (born 1955), novelist
- Marianne Philips (1886–1951), psychological novelist and politician
- Ethel Portnoy (1927–2004), essayist, columnist and fiction writer in English
- Maria Pypelinckx (1538–1608), correspondent

== Q ==
- Catharina Questiers (1631–1669), poet and playwright

== R ==
- Veronique Renard (born 1965), trans woman memoirist and non-fiction writer in English
- Astrid Roemer (1947–2026), Suriname novelist and poet living in the Netherlands
- Henriette Roland Holst (1869–1952), poet, playwright and biographer
- Hannie Rouweler (born 1951), Dutch poet
- Heleen van Royen (born 1965), novelist and columnist
- Renate Rubinstein (1929–1990), journalist, columnist and non-fiction writer
- Helga Ruebsamen (1934–2016), columnist and novelist
- Anna Rutgers van der Loeff (1910–1990), children's writer

== S ==
- Heleen Sancisi-Weerdenburg (1944–2000), historical works on Ancient Greece and Persia
- Annet Schaap (born 1965), children's literature
- Margo Scharten-Antink (1868–1957), poet and novelist
- Mineke Schipper (born 1938), novelist and non-fiction writer on women's literature
- Annie M. G. Schmidt (1911–1995), children's writer and television screenwriter
- Anna Maria van Schurman (1607–1678), German-born poet with works in Latin in defence of female education
- Anja Sicking (born 1965), fiction writer
- Hilda van Stockum (1908–2006), English-language children's writer

== T ==
- Marianne Thieme (born 1972), politician and writer on animals rights
- Petronella Johanna de Timmerman (1723–1786), poet and translator

== U ==
- Mellie Uyldert (1908–2009), astrologer and esoteric writer

== V ==
- M. Vasalis (1909–1998), poet and psychiatrist
- Cornelia van der Veer (1639–1704), poet
- Jacoba van Velde (1903–1985), novelist author of De grote zaal
- Stephanie Vetter (1884–1974), fiction writer
- Anna Visscher (1584–1651), poet and translator
- Simone van der Vlugt (born 1966), historical and young-adult novelist
- Frida Vogels (1930–2026), fiction writer
- Ida Vos (1931–2006), children's writer
- Beb Vuyk (1905–1991), Indo fiction writer

== W ==
- Lulu Wang (born 1960), Chinese-born novelist writing in Dutch
- Elly de Waard (born 1940), poet and music critic
- Maria Petronella Woesthoven (1760–1830), poet
- Betje Wolff (1738–1804), epistolary novelist of works co-authored with Aagje Deken
- Yael van der Wouden (born 1987), novelist

== Z ==
- Marie van Zeggelen (1870–1957), novelist and children's writer
- Annejet van der Zijl (born 1962), novelist and biographer
- Maria van Zuylekom (1759–1831), poet and author
- Codien Zwaardemaker-Visscher (1835–1912), writer, translator and feminist
- Aurelia Zwartte (fl. 1720s), poet

== See also ==
- List of women writers
- List of Dutch writers
