= Questiers =

Questiers is a surname. Notable people with the surname include:

- Catharina Questiers (1631–1669), Dutch poet and dramatist
- David Questiers (1623–1663), Dutch poet
