= Starink =

Starink is a surname. Notable people with the surname include:

- Brenda Starink (born 1974), Dutch backstroke swimmer
- Ed Starink (born 1952), Dutch composer, arranger, session musician and record producer
- Mike Starink (born 1970), Dutch television presenter and stage actor
