= Batavia, Dutch East Indies =

Capital of the Dutch East Indies

Batavia
- Former capital city (1619–1949)
- City Municipality of Batavia; Stadsgemeente Batavia

Other transcription(s)
  - Chinese: 勿礁維
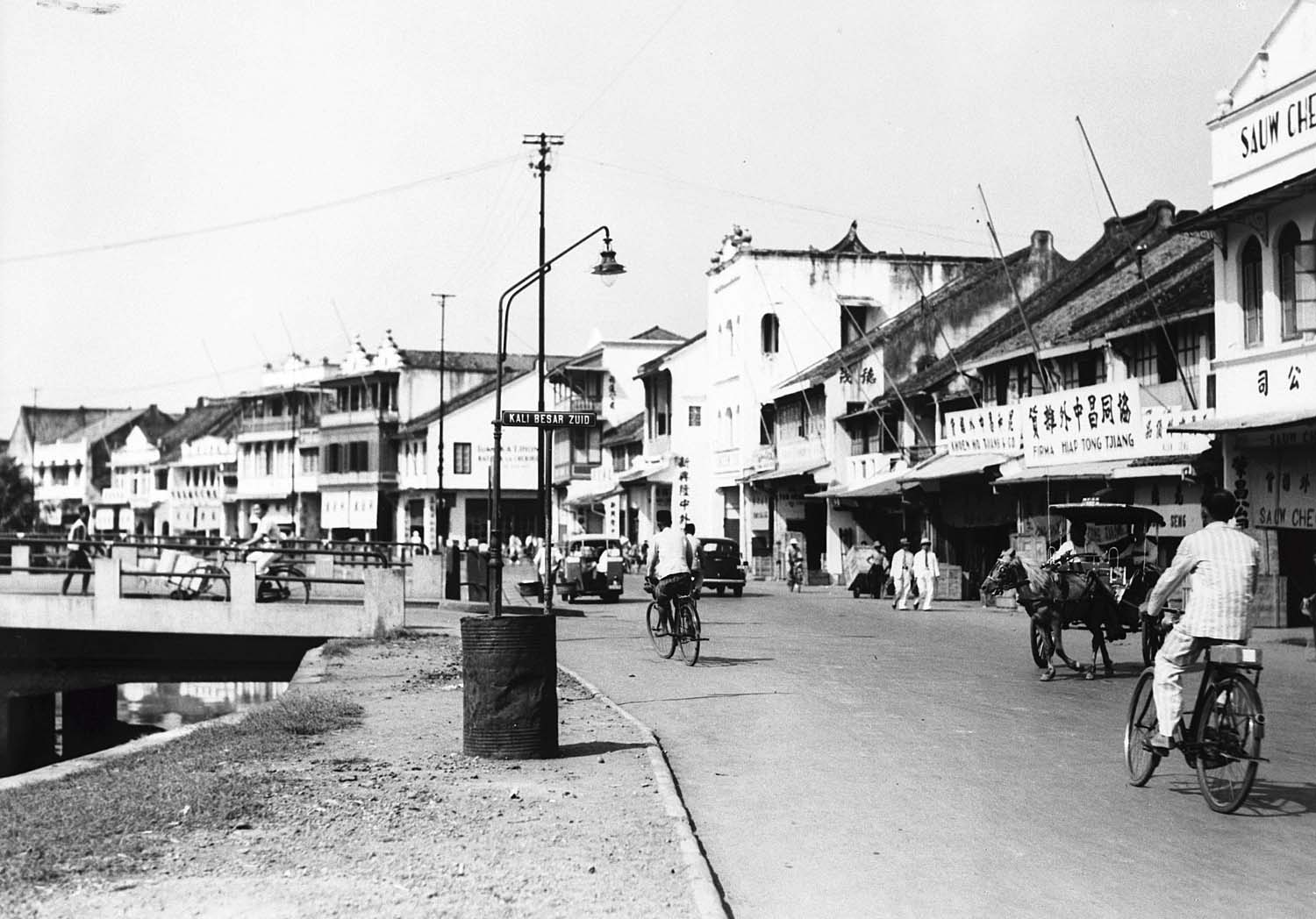
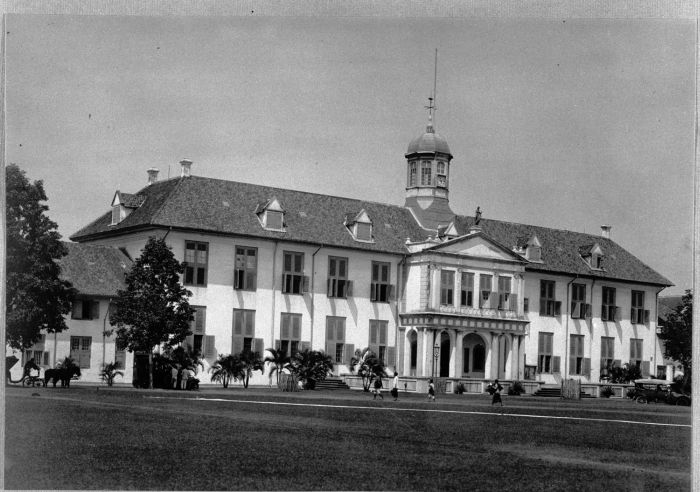
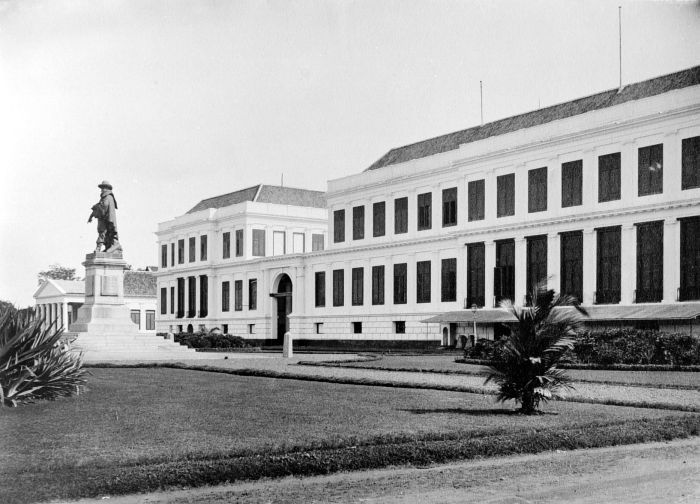
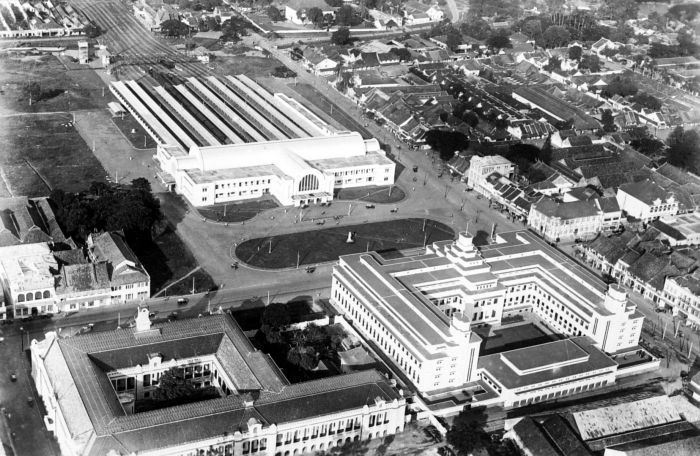
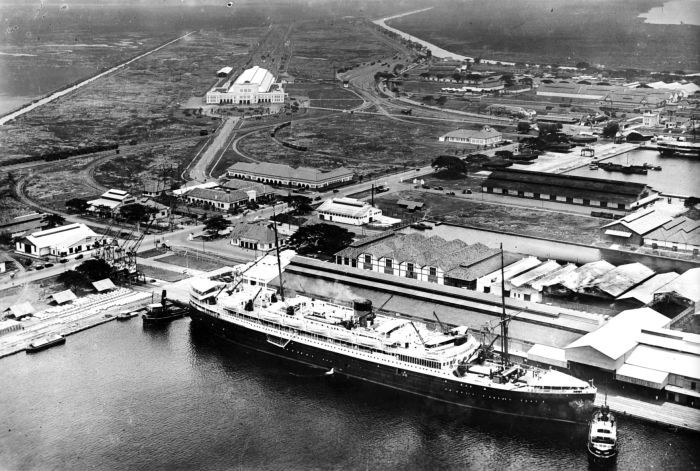
- Kali Besar in 1938 Stadhuis in Oud Batavia Statue of J.P. Coen in front of the Grote Huis building Aerial view of Batavia Zuid railway station Tandjoengpriok port

- Flag Coat of arms
- Nickname: Koningin van het Oosten "Queen of the Orient"
- Motto: Dispereert Niet (Dutch) "Do Not Despair"
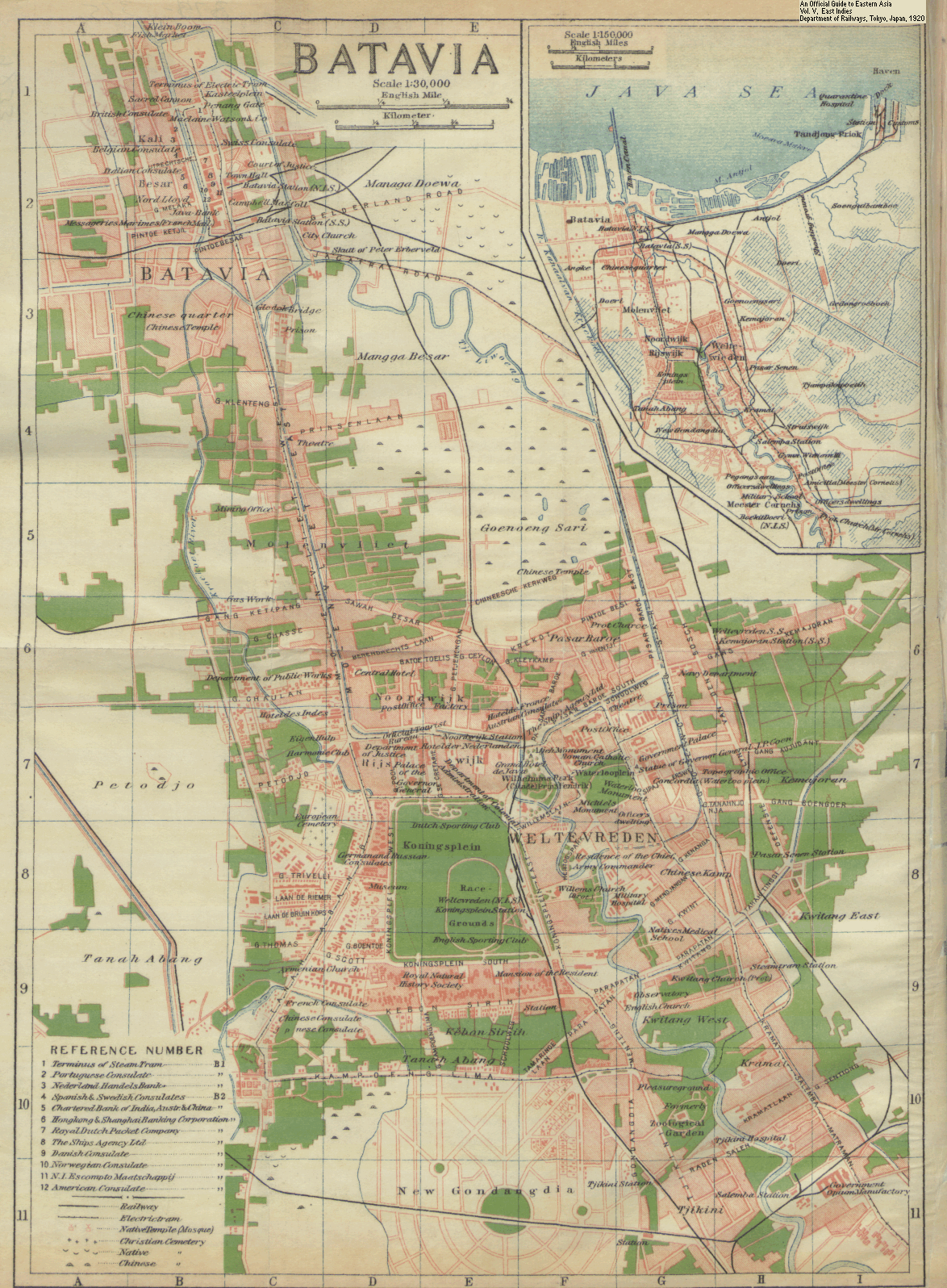
- Map of Batavia, c. 1920
- Territory: Dutch East Indies
- Governorate: West Java
- Residency: Batavia
- Conquered: 30 May 1619
- Japanese occupation; renamed to Jakarta: 1942–1945
- Dutch re-occupation: 1946–1949
- Independence: 17 August 1945

Government
  - Body: Gemeenteraad Batavia
  - Mayor: G. J. Bisschop (first); Sastromoeljono (last)

Population (1920)
  - Total: 253,800

Batavia was an imperial Dutch port city that eventually, after two centuries of Dutch occupation, became the capital of the Dutch East Indies. The area corresponds to modern Jakarta, Indonesia. Batavia can refer to the city proper or its suburbs and hinterland, the Ommelanden, which included the much larger area of the Residency of Batavia in the modern Indonesian provinces of Jakarta Banten and West Java.

The founding of Batavia by the Dutch in 1619, on the site of the ruins of Jayakarta, led to the establishment of a Dutch colony; Batavia became the center of the Dutch East India Company's trading network in Asia. Monopolies on local produce were augmented by non-indigenous cash crops. To safeguard their commercial interests, the company and the colonial administration absorbed surrounding territory.

Batavia is on the north coast of Java, in a sheltered bay, on a land of marshland and hills crisscrossed with canals. The city had two centers: Oud Batavia (the oldest part of the city) and Weltevreden (the relatively newer city), on higher ground to the south.

It was a European colonial city for about 320 years until 1942, when the Dutch East Indies was occupied by Japan during World War II. During the Japanese occupation and after Indonesian nationalists declared independence on 17 August 1945, the city was known as Jakarta. It remained internationally known by its Dutch name until Indonesia achieved full independence in 1949, when the city was renamed Djakarta, and eventually Jakarta.

== Dutch East India Company (1610–1799) ==
=== Arrival ===
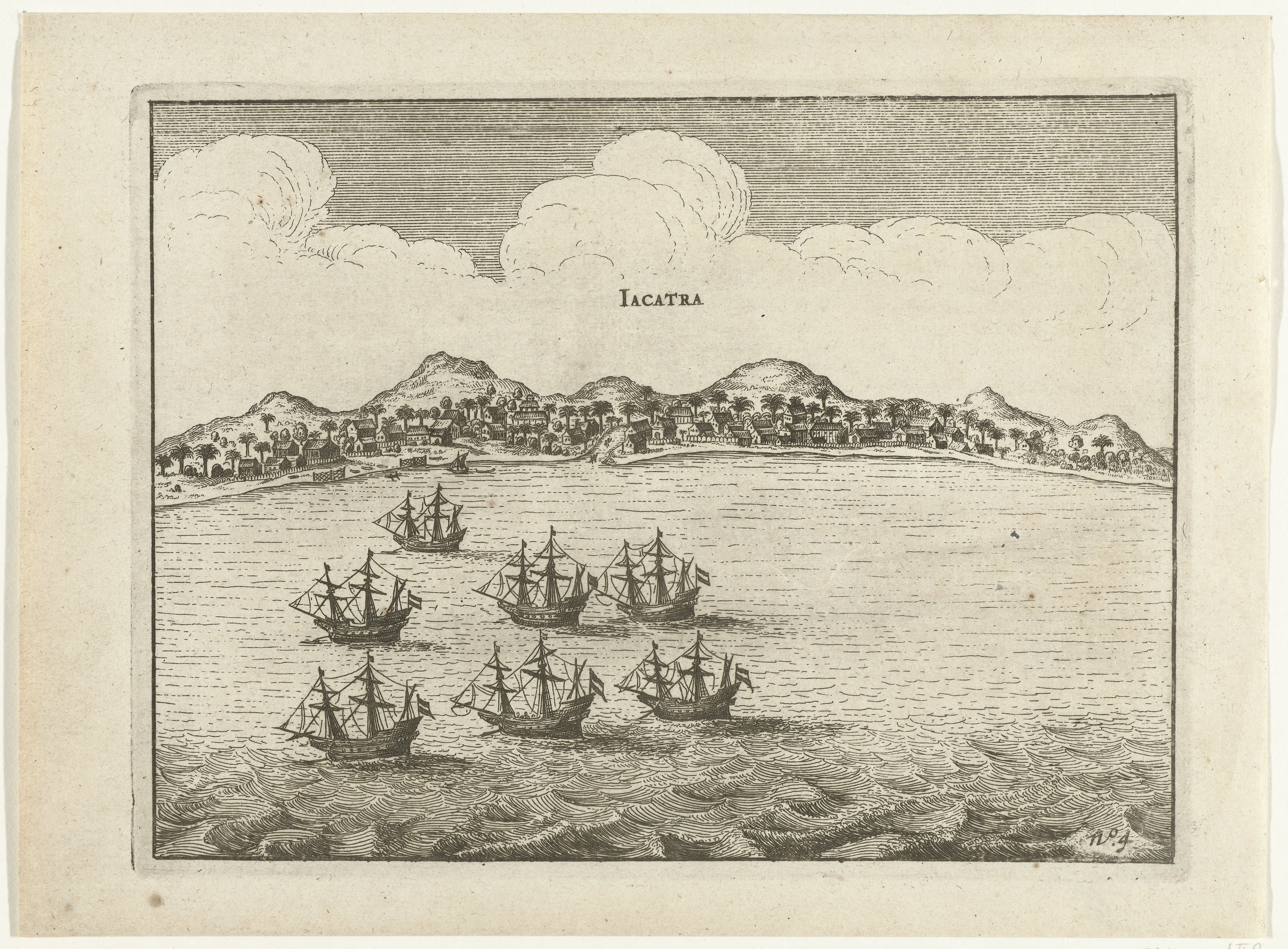
Jayakarta in 1607, around 12 years before its conquest.

Amsterdam merchants embarked on an expedition to the East Indies archipelago in 1595 under the command of Cornelis de Houtman. The English East India Company's first voyage in 1602, commanded by James Lancaster, arrived in Aceh and sailed on to Bantam. There, Lancaster was permitted to build a trading post which was the center of English trade in the East Indies archipelago until 1682.

The Dutch government granted the Dutch East India Company (VOC) a monopoly on Asian trade in 1602. A year later, the first permanent Dutch trading post in the East Indies archipelago was established in Bantam, West Java. Prince Jayawikarta gave Dutch merchants permission to build a wooden warehouse and houses on the east bank of the Ciliwung river opposite Jayakarta in 1610, and the outpost was established the following year. As Dutch power increased, Jayawikarta allowed the English to build houses on the west bank of the Ciliwung and a fort near his customs office to maintain a balance of power.

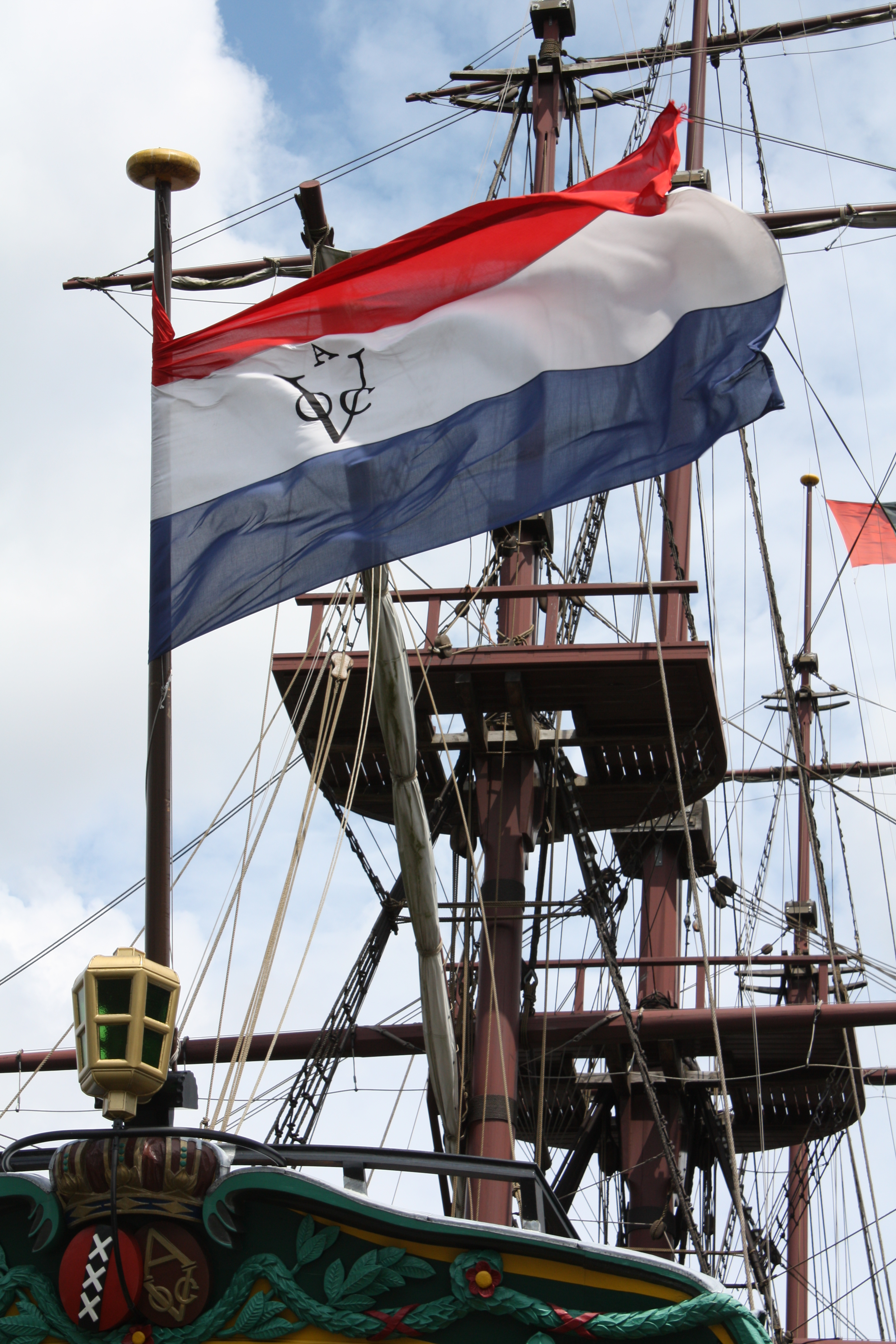
Replica of the East Indiaman Amsterdam of the Dutch East India Company/United East Indies Company (VOC)

Tensions between Prince Jayawikarta and the Dutch escalated until 1618, when Jayawikarta's soldiers besieged the Dutch fortress containing the Nassau and Mauritius warehouse. An English fleet of 15 ships arrived under Thomas Dale, former governor of the colony of Virginia. After a sea battle, newly appointed Dutch governor Jan Pieterszoon Coen escaped to the Moluccas to seek support; the Dutch had taken over the first of the Portuguese forts there in 1605. Dutch garrison commander Pieter van den Broecke and five other men were arrested during negotiations, since Jayawikarta believed that he had been deceived by the Dutch. Jayawikarta and the English then forged an alliance.

The Dutch army was on the verge of surrendering to the English when, in 1619, the Sultanate of Banten sent a group of soldiers to summon Jayawikarta. Jayawikarta's agreement with the English had not been approved by the Bantenese authorities. The conflict between Banten and Jayawikarta and the tense relationship between Banten and the English provided a new opportunity for the Dutch. Coen returned from the Moluccas with reinforcements on 28 May 1619, razing Jayakarta to the ground two days later and expelling its population. Only the Luso-Sundanese padrão remained.

Jayawikarta retreated to Tanara, in the interior of Banten, where he later died. The Dutch established a closer relationship with Banten and assumed control of the port, which became the regional Dutch center of power.

=== Founding ===
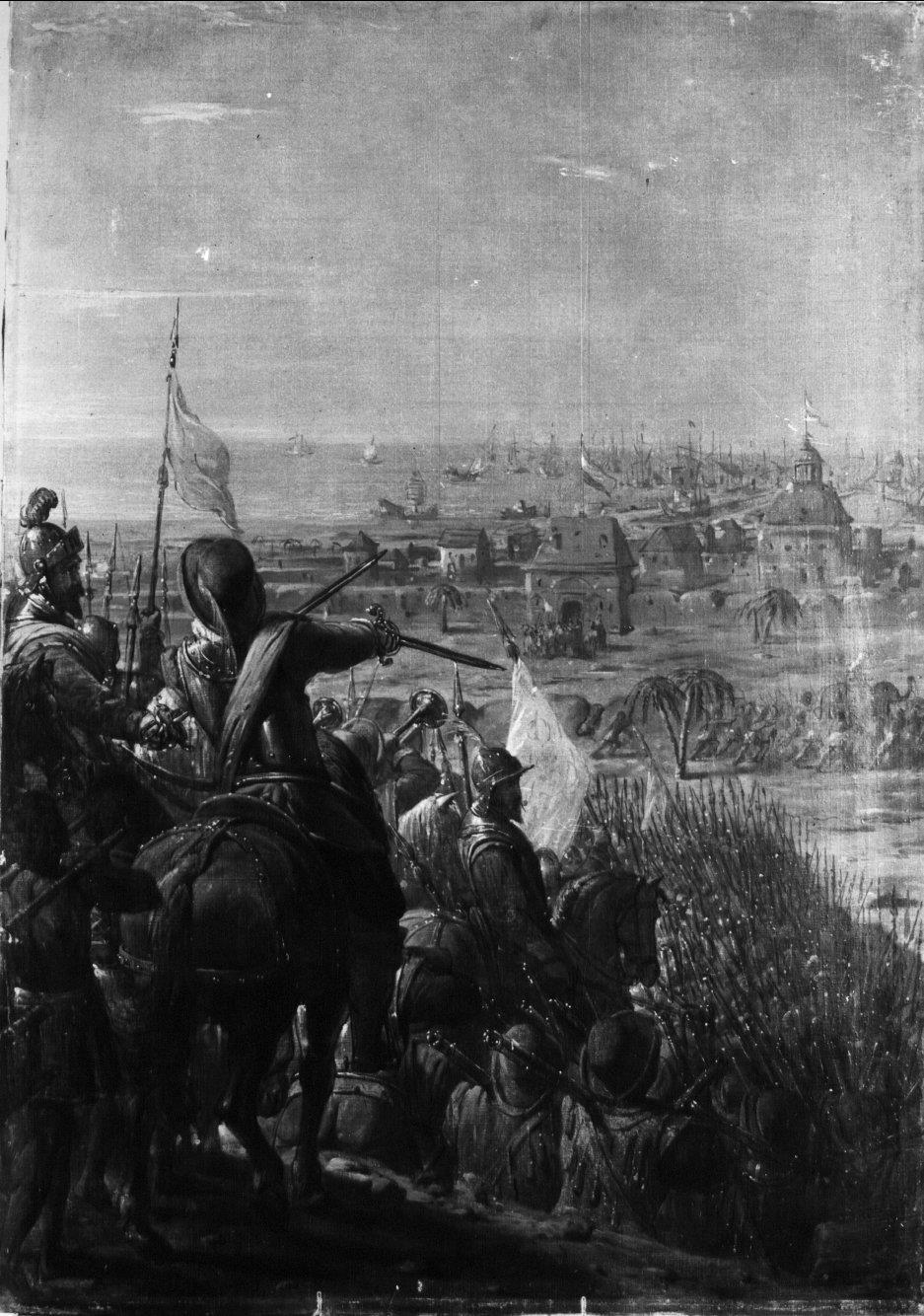
Foundation of Batavia, by Barend Wijnveld

The region which became Batavia came under Dutch control in 1619, initially as an expansion of the original Dutch fort and a new building on the ruins of the former Jayakarta. Coen decided to expand the original fort into a larger fortress on 2 July 1619, and sent plans for Batavia Castle to the Netherlands on 7 October of that year. The castle was larger than the previous one, with two northern bastions protecting it from a maritime attack. The Nassau and Mauritius warehouses were expanded with the erection of an eastern fort extension, overseen by Commander Van Raay, on 12 March 1619.

Although Coen wanted to name the new settlement Nieuw-Hoorn after Hoorn (his birthplace), he was prevented from doing so by the board of the VOC. Batavia was chosen as the new name of the fort and settlement, and a naming ceremony was held on 18 January 1621. It was named after the Batavi Germanic tribe, which inhabited the Batavian region during the Roman Empire; at the time, it was believed that the tribe was the ancestors of the Dutch people. Jayakarta was called Batavia for over 300 years.

There were three governmental administrations in the Batavia region. Initial authority was established in 1609 and became the colonial High Government, consisting of the Governor-General and the Council of the Indies. The urban (or civil) administration of the city of Batavia was established in 1620. On 24 June 1620, two company officials and three free citizens (or burghers) were appointed to the first College of Aldermen. The local rural administration, formed in 1664, became fully functional in 1682. The Javanese people were prohibited from settling in Batavia from the time of its founding in 1619.

=== Expansion ===
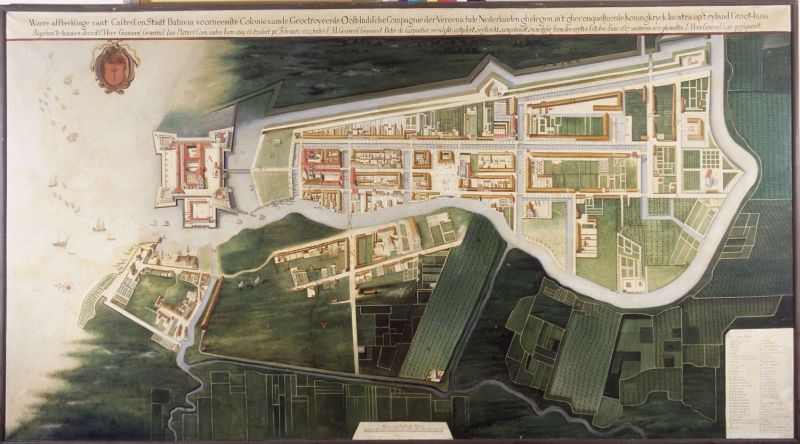
Batavia and its eastern expansion

From its founding, Batavia was planned in a well-defined layout. Three trenches were dug east of the Ciliwung River in 1619, its first Dutch-made canals. The canals were named (from south to north) Leeuwengracht, Groenegracht, and Steenhouwersgracht. The castle area begins in a former field north of Steenhouwersgracht, in which a town market was established. The first church and town hall were built c. 1622 on the east bank of the river; Batavia's first combined church and town hall (replaced during the 1630s) was at 6°07′56″S 106°48′42″E.

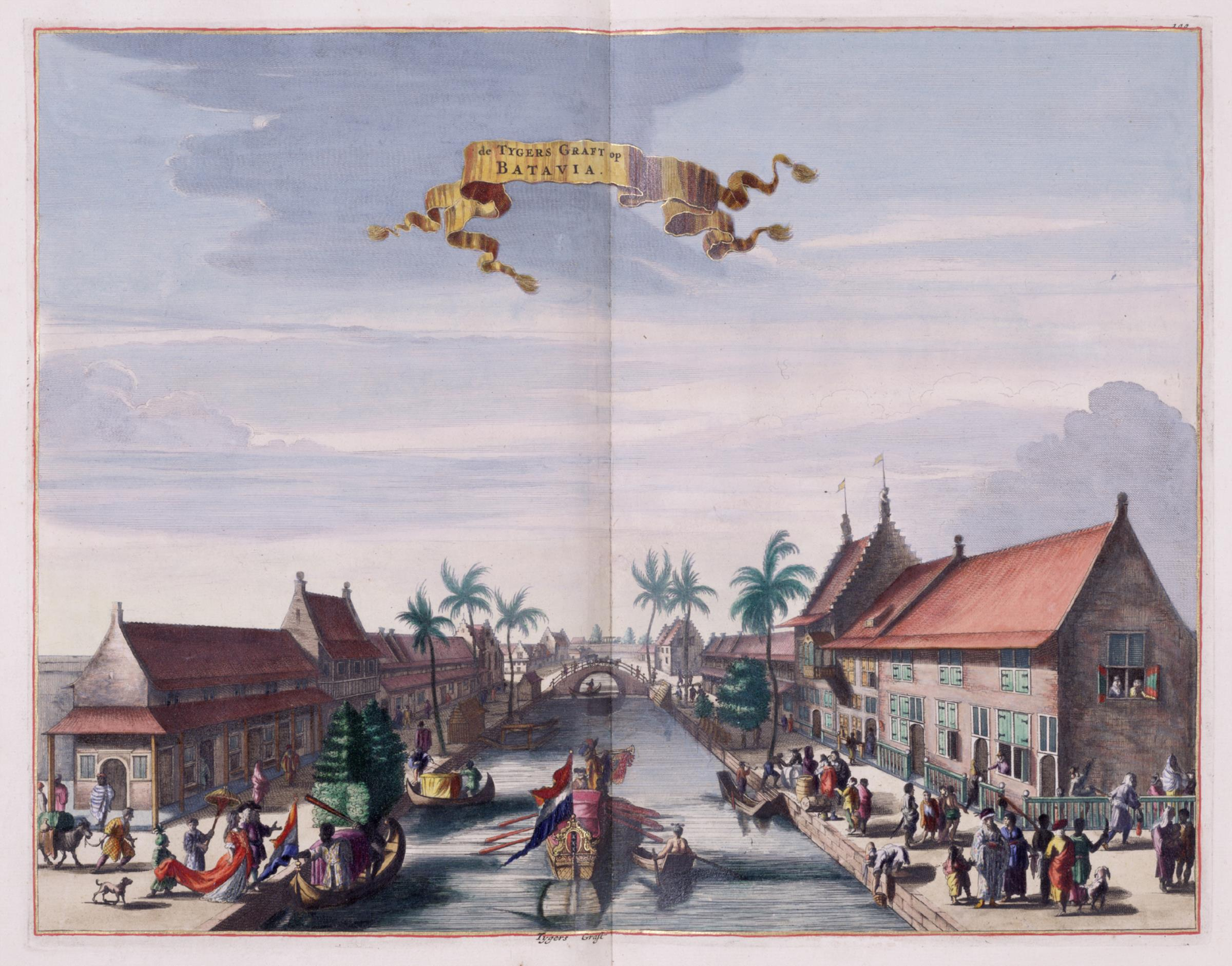
The coconut tree–lined Tijgersgracht canal

Around 1627, the three canals were connected with the Tijgersgracht canal. The new canal was lined with coconut trees; according to a contemporary observer, "Among the Grachts, the Tygersgracht is the most stately and most pleasant, both for the goodliness of its buildings, and the ornamentation of its streets, which afford a very agreeable shadow to those who pass along the street". The Prinsestraat, originally the street leading to the castle, became an urban center connecting the castle's south gate with the city hall.

Eastern Batavia was protected by a long canal which linked the castle moat and the Ciliwung riverbend, and ran at a slight angle to Tijgersgracht. The canal cost over 160,000 real, which was paid mostly by the Chinese instead of the company (who had strengthened the castle with slave and prison labor). The short-lived outer canal was redesigned several years after the 1628–1629 siege of Batavia.

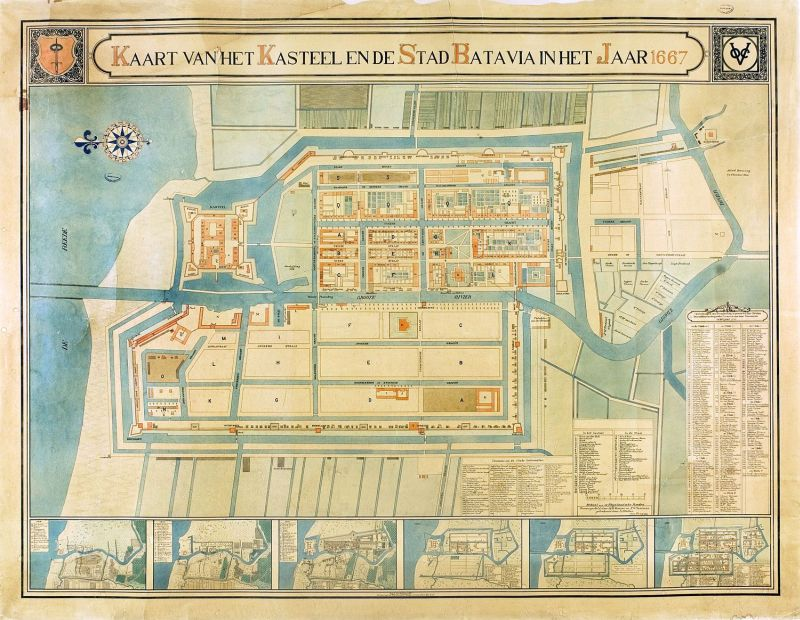
Batavia in 1667

Sultan Agung (king of the Mataram Sultanate) gained control of most of Java by defeating Surabaya in 1625. On 27 August 1628, Agung began the siege of Batavia. After heavy losses in his first attempt, he retreated and launched a second offensive the following year. This also failed; the Dutch fleet destroyed his supplies and ships in the harbors of Cirebon and Tegal. Mataram troops, starving and decimated by illness, retreated again. Agung then moved east, attacking Blitar, Panarukan and the Blambangan Kingdom in eastern Java (a vassal state of the Balinese kingdom of Gelgel).

After the siege, it was decided that Batavia needed a stronger defense system. Based on the work of Flemish mathematician and military engineer Simon Stevin, Governor-General Jacques Specx designed a moat and city wall; extensions of the wall were built west of Batavia, and the city was completely enclosed.

In 1656, due to a conflict with Banten, the Javanese were not allowed to live within the city walls and settled outside Batavia. The Chinese and the Mardijkers were the only non-Dutch settlers within the walled city. A 1659 truce with Banten enabled the city to grow, and more bamboo houses were built. Bamboo houses and livestock were banned in 1667, and the wealthy Dutch built tall houses and canals.

=== The region ===
The region was an important source of food crops and building materials. The VOC established a local government in 1664, which became fully functional in 1682. Chinese inhabitants began to cultivate sugarcane.

Large-scale cultivation negatively impacted the environment, and Batavia's northern area experienced coastal erosion. The canals required extensive maintenance, with frequent closures for dredging. Residents of the Ommelanden lived in country houses or ethnic kampungs governed by a headman.

=== 1740 massacre and opening to trade ===
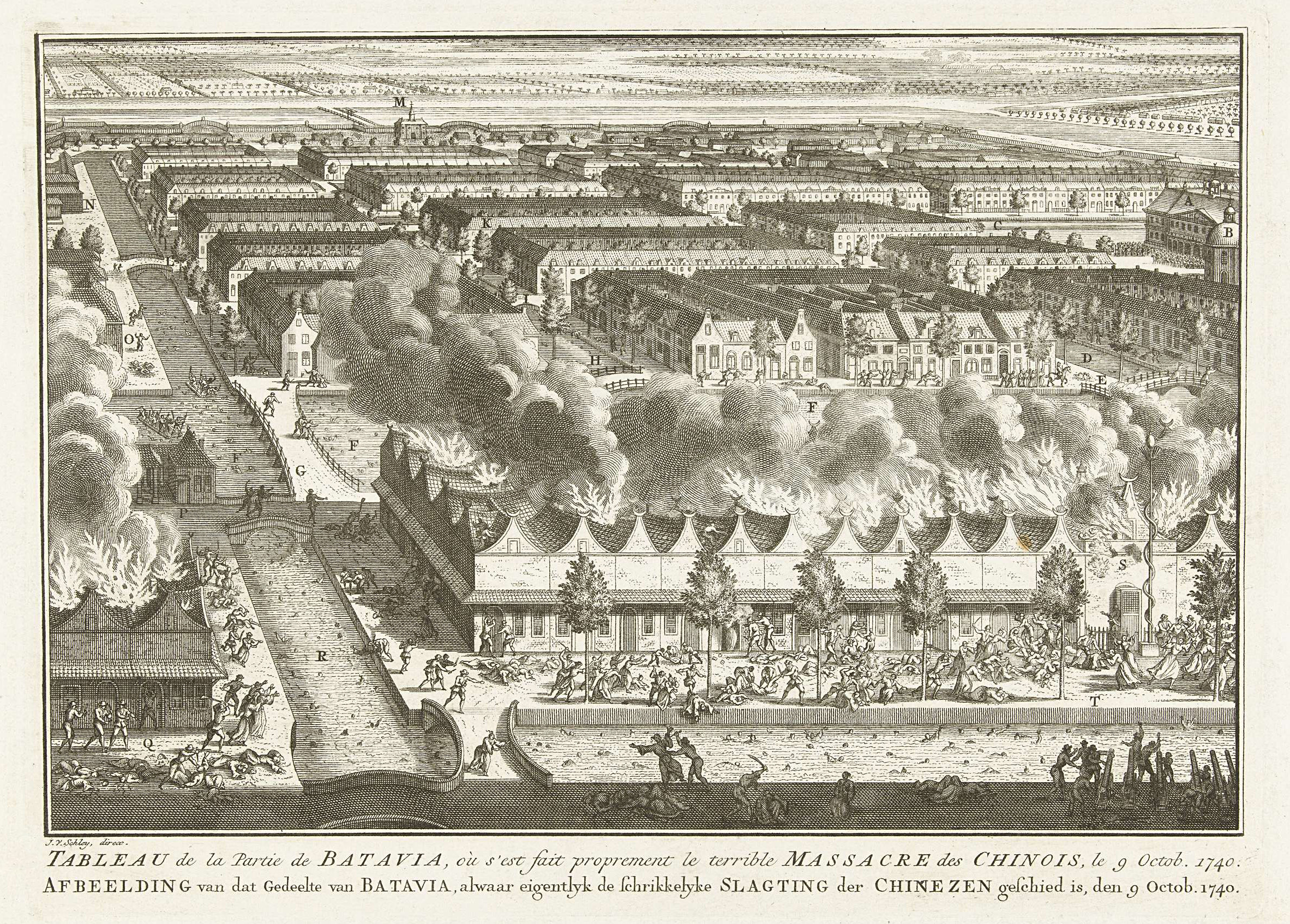
Contemporary etching of the massacre

Batavia's sugar industry declined during the 1730s, with rising unemployment and social disorder. In 1739, there were 10,574 Chinese people living in the Ommelanden. Tensions grew as the colonial government attempted to restrict Chinese immigration with deportations to Ceylon and South Africa.

The Chinese, afraid that they would be thrown overboard to drown, rioted. Ten thousand Chinese were killed from 9 to 22 October 1740. The few surviving Chinese inhabitants were moved to Glodok, outside the city walls, the following year.

In 1789, the Americans visited and were permitted through formal applications to trade.

== Dutch East Indies (1800–1949) ==
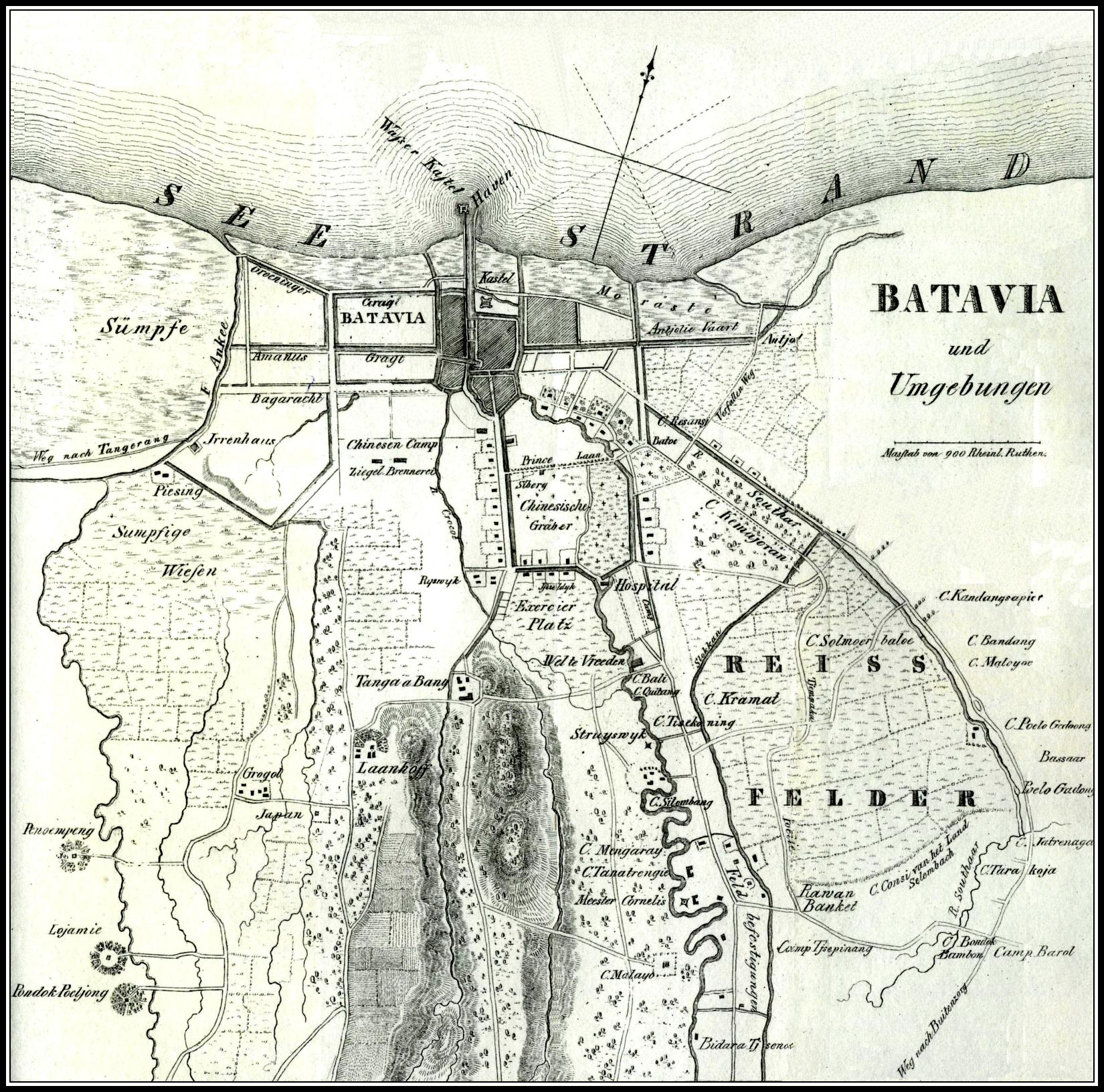
Southern expansion, 1840

After the VOC went bankrupt and was dissolved in 1800, the Batavian Republic nationalized its debts and possessions and expanded its territorial claims into a colony known as the Dutch East Indies. Batavia evolved from a regional company headquarters into the colony's capital.

=== Southward expansion ===
In 1808, Herman Willem Daendels decided to leave the dilapidated, unhealthy Old Town. A new town center was built further south, on the Weltevreden estate. Batavia became a city with two centers; Kota was the business hub with offices and warehouses of shipping and trading companies, and Weltevreden was home to the government, military, and shops. The centers were connected by the Molenvliet Canal and a road alongside the canal.

=== British rule ===
Under British rule, Daendels was replaced by Stamford Raffles. In 1811, Raffles—who was employed by the British East India Company as secretary to the governor of Malacca—decided to take over the government in Batavia. One reason was to prevent the French from stepping in completely, since Napoleon had nominated Daendels (who worked closely with the French).

In 1816, the Dutch returned to rule the region. Europeans were brought to the archipelago to establish a colony on vacant land, triggering wars in Java and Sumatra. Large numbers of troops were brought into the Dutch Indies to suppress unrest (particularly on Sumatra) and extend Dutch government influence beyond Java. However, the Dutch never conquered the entire archipelago.

The development of Weltevreden as the colony's administrative center continued, gradually shifting the center of Batavia south from Oud Batavia. A new Indies Empire style of architecture emerged; white-plastered villas with a large front porch were built, especially around the Koningsplein and at Weltevreden. This newer part of Batavia generally had a more open look than Oud Batavia's developed, canal cityscape.

=== Technological advances ===
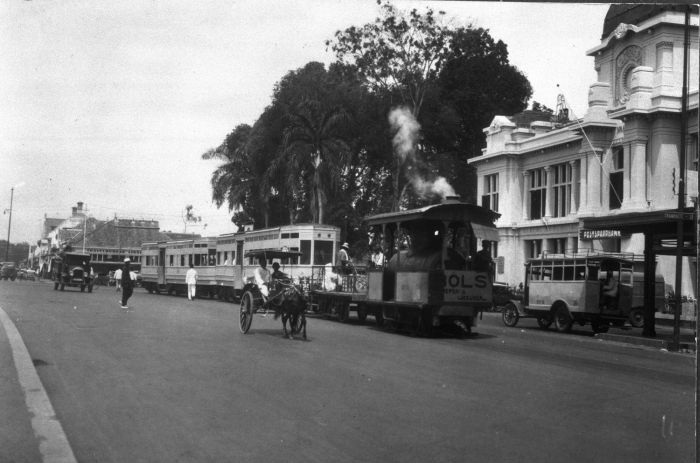
Trams in Molenvliet

Unlike the first half of the 19th century, the second half of the century was a peaceful period characterized by economic and technological expansion and a stable government. In 1856, the region's first telegraph line was installed between Batavia and Buitenzorg. In 1859, Batavia was connected to Singapore with the Dutch East Indies' first international telegraph connection. The city completed its first gasworks two years later, and its streets were lit with gas by 1862. The first trams and telephones came in 1882.

Horse-drawn tram, introduced to Batavia in 1869, were upgraded to steam power in 1882 and electricity in 1900. The city's first railway also began in 1869, and the line from Batavia to Buitenzorg was completed in 1873. The city's first ice house was built in 1870.

The 1869 opening of the Suez Canal increased the need for a new port. The port of Tanjung Priok was completed in 1885, replacing the centuries-old, inadequate Sunda Kelapa, significantly increasing trade and tourism in Batavia and the Dutch East Indies.

=== Abolition of Cultivation System ===
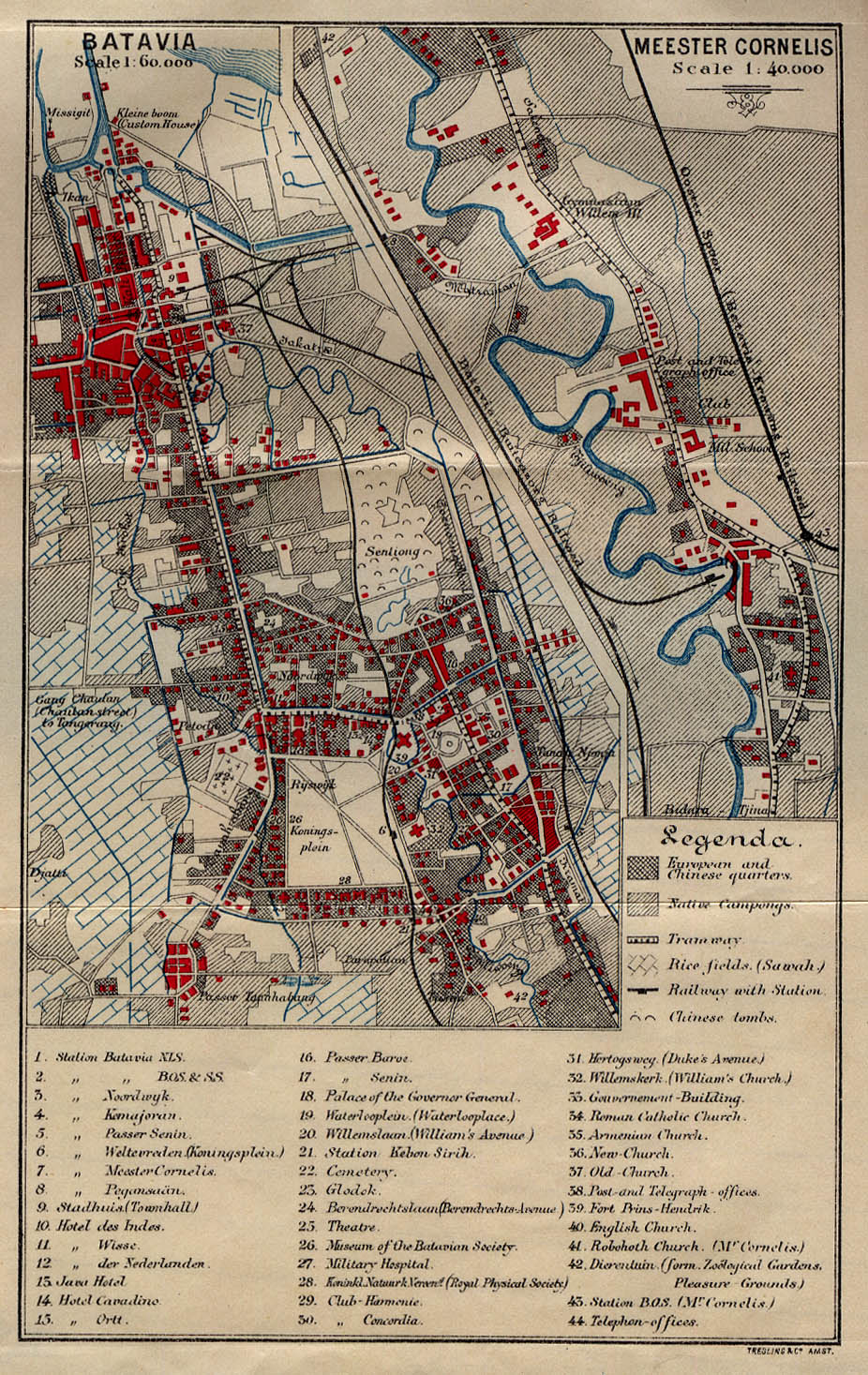
Batavia in 1897

The Cultivation System (cultuurstelsel) was a mid-19th-century Dutch government policy which required a portion of agricultural production to be export crops. Indonesian historians refer to it as tanam paksa (enforced planting).

The 1870 abolition of the Cultivation System led to the rapid development of private enterprise in the Dutch East Indies. A number of trading companies and financial institutions were established on Java, particularly in Batavia. The Old Town's deteriorating structures were replaced with offices, usually along the Ciliwung River. Private companies owned (or managed) plantations, oil fields, and mines. The island's first railway line opened in 1867, and railway stations were built in urban centers such as Batavia.

Schools, hospitals, factories, offices, trading companies, and post offices were established throughout the city. Improvements in Batavia's transportation, health, and technology encouraged more Dutch people to move to the capital, and Batavian society became increasingly Dutch. The city traded with Europe, and increased shipping led to the construction of a new harbor at Tanjung Priok between 1877 and 1883.

Foreigners were known locally as totoks, distinguishing new Chinese arrivals from the peranakans. Many totoks adopted Indonesian culture, wearing kebayas, sarongs, and summer dresses.

By the end of the 19th century, Batavia's population was 115,887 people; of these, 8,893 were Europeans, 26,817 were Chinese and 77,700 were indigenous islanders. The city's expanding commercial activity led to the immigration of large numbers of Dutch employees and rural Javanese to Batavia. The 1905 population of Batavia and its surrounding area reached 2.1 million, including 93,000 Chinese people, 14,000 Europeans, and 2,800 Arabs. This growth resulted in an increased demand for housing, and land prices soared. New houses were built close together, and kampung settlements filled spaces between the houses. Settlements, built with little regard for the region's tropical conditions, resulted in overcrowding, poor sanitation, and an absence of public amenities. Java had an outbreak of plague in 1913.

Old Batavia's abandoned moats and ramparts experienced a boom during the period, as trading companies were established along the Ciliwung. The old city soon re-established itself as a commercial center, with 20th- and 17th-century buildings adjacent to one another.

=== Dutch Ethical Policy ===
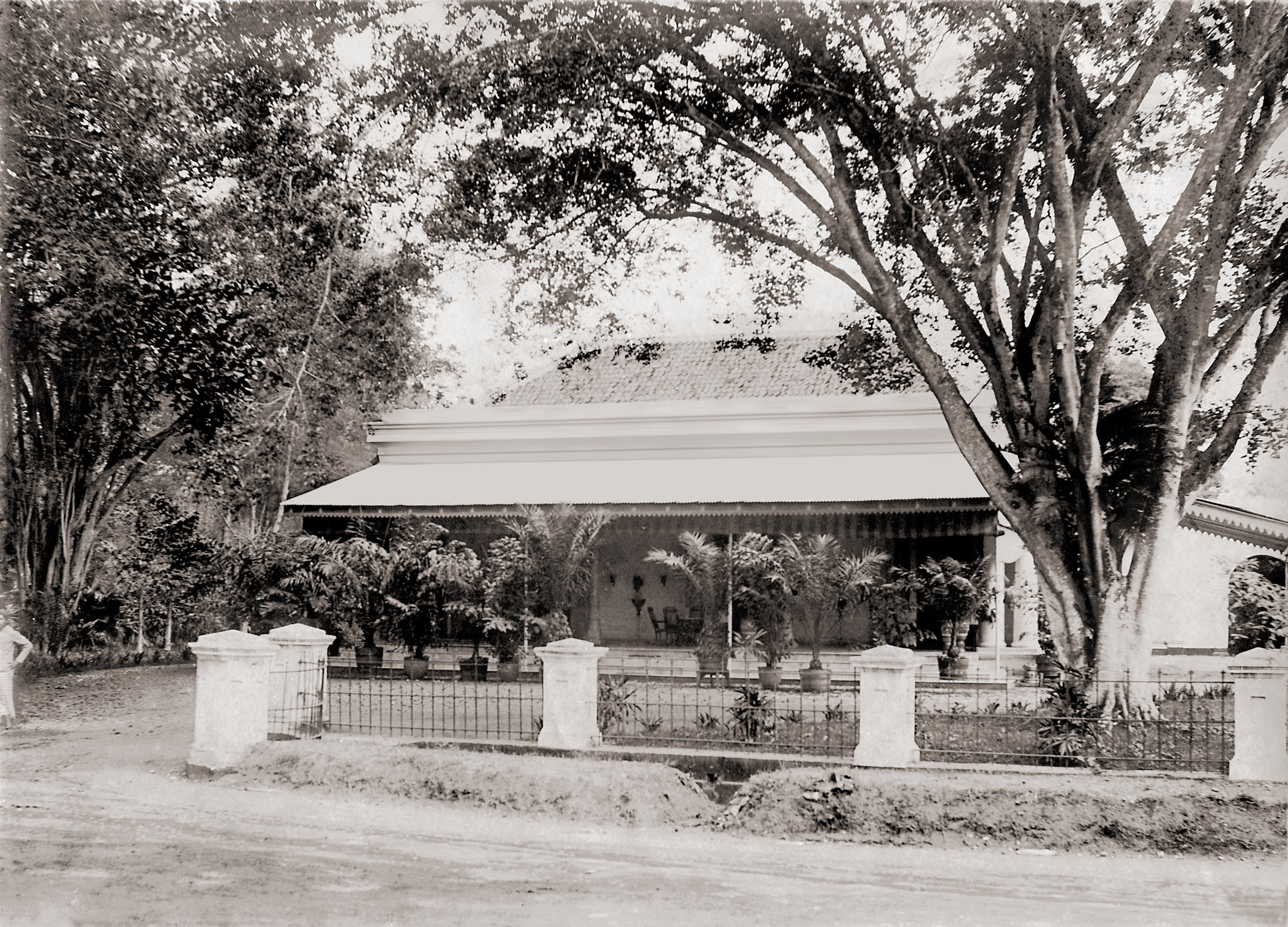
Batavia, Weltevreden, Koningsplein, Hotel der Nederlanden c. 1912

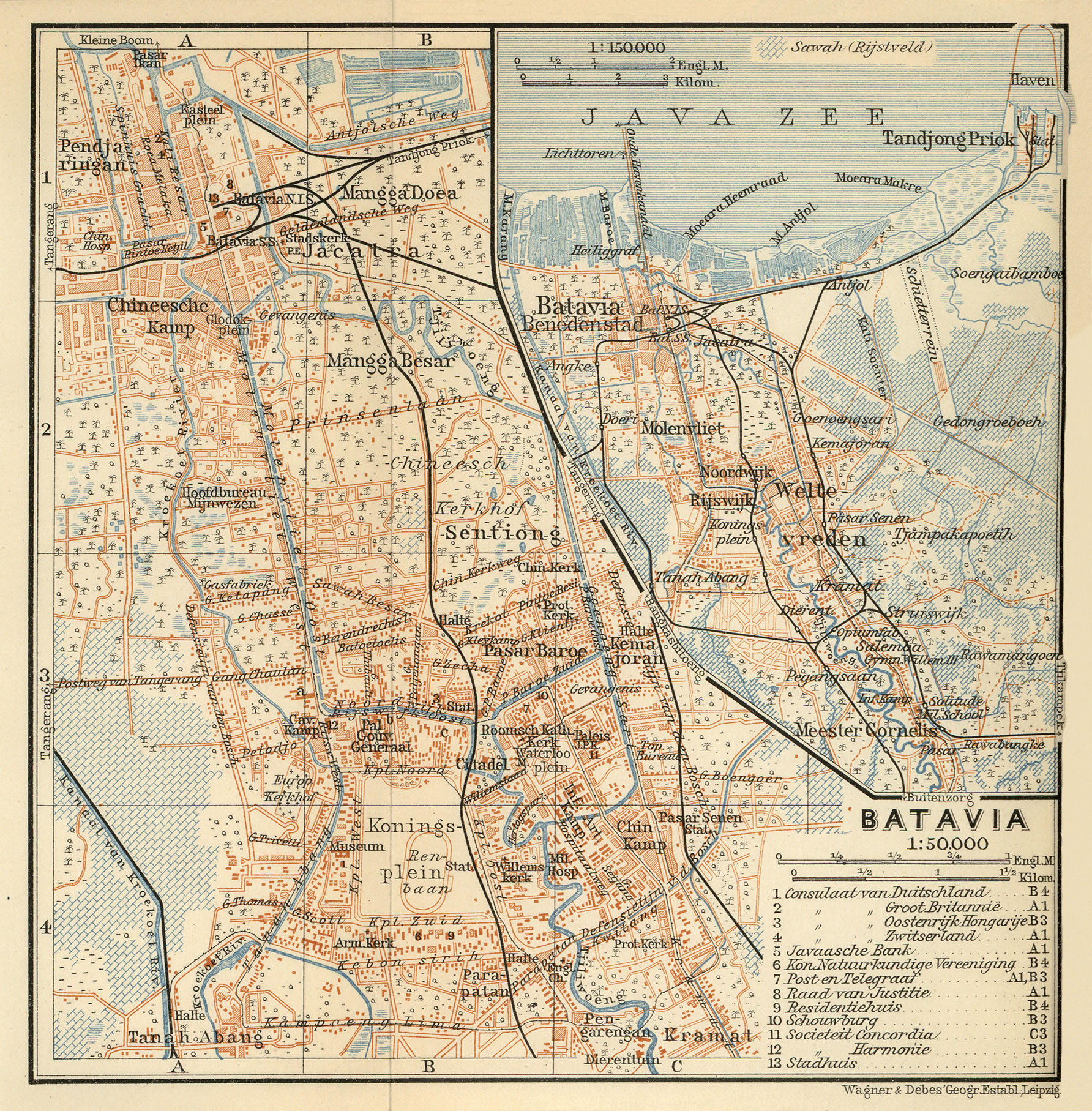
Batavia c. 1914

The Dutch Ethical Policy was introduced in 1901, expanding educational opportunities for the indigenous population of the Dutch East Indies. In 1924, a law school was founded in Batavia. The city's population in the 1930 census was 435,000.

The University of Batavia was established in 1941, and later became the University of Indonesia. In 1946, the Dutch colonial government established the Nood Universiteit (Emergency University) in Jakarta. The following year, its name was changed to Universiteit van Indonesië (UVI). After the Indonesian National Revolution the government established Universiteit Indonesia, a state university, in Jakarta in February 1950. Its name was later changed to Universitas Indonesia.

=== Independence movement ===
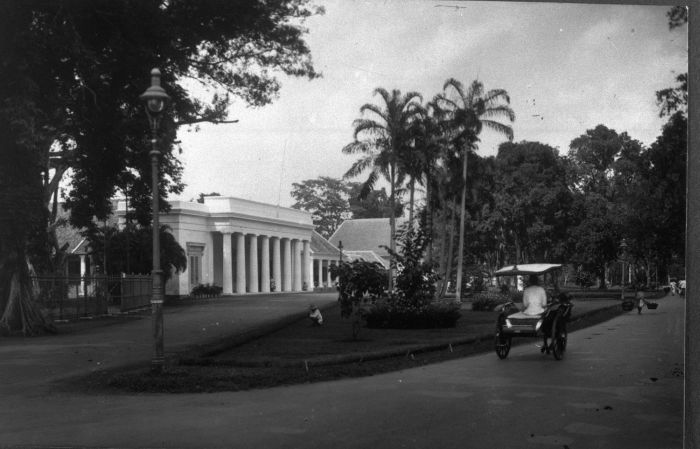
Volksraad parliament building

Volksraad member Mohammad Husni Thamrin criticized the colonial government for ignoring the kampungs and catering to the wealthy in Menteng. In 1909, Tirto Adhi Soerjo founded the Islamic Commercial Union in Batavia to support Indonesian merchants. Branches in other areas followed. In 1920, Oemar Said Tjokroaminoto and Agus Salim established a committee in Batavia to support the Ottoman Caliphate.

Spies warned the Dutch about a planned revolt in 1926, and Communist Party of Indonesia (PKI) leaders were arrested. Andries Cornelis Dirk de Graeff replaced Dirk Fock as governor-general, and uprisings in Batavia, Banten, and Priangan were quickly crushed. Armed Communists occupied the Batavia telephone exchange for one night before they were captured. The Dutch sent prisoners to Banden and to a penal colony at Boven-Digoel in West New Guinea, where many died of malaria. Sukarno and the Study Club founded the Indonesian Nationalist Association (which became the Indonesian National Party and later joined the Partai Sarekat Islam, Budi Utomo, and the Surabaya Study Club to form the Union of Indonesian Political Associations) on 4 July 1927.

A youth congress was held in Batavia in October 1928, and the groups began referring to the city as Jakarta. They demanded Indonesian independence, displayed the red-and-white flag, and sang the Indonesian national anthem written by Wage Rudolf Supratman. The Dutch banned the flag, the national anthem, and the words "Indonesia" and "Indonesian".

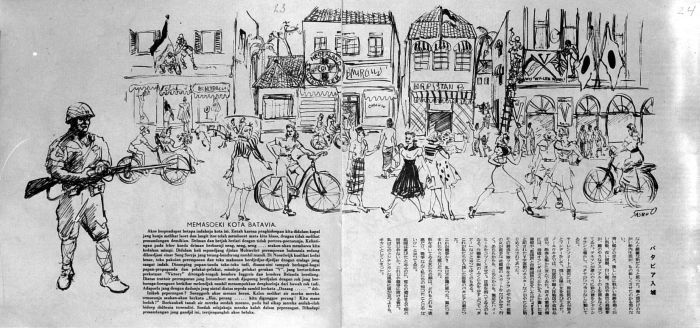
Drawing of the imagined Japanese entry into Batavia

On 5 March 1942, Batavia fell to the Japanese. The Dutch formally surrendered to the Japanese occupation forces on 9 March 1942, and the colony's government was transferred to Japan. Batavia was renamed Jakarta. The economic situation and the physical condition of Indonesian cities deteriorated during the occupation. Buildings were converted to internment camps for the Dutch.

After the Japanese defeat in 1945, the region experienced a period of transition and upheaval during the Indonesian struggle for independence. During the Japanese occupation, and when the Indonesian nationalists declared independence on 17 August 1945, the city was renamed Jakarta. In 1945, it was briefly occupied by the Allies and returned to the Dutch. The Dutch name, Batavia, remained the internationally recognized name until Indonesian independence was achieved and Jakarta proclaimed the national capital on 27 December 1949.

== Society ==
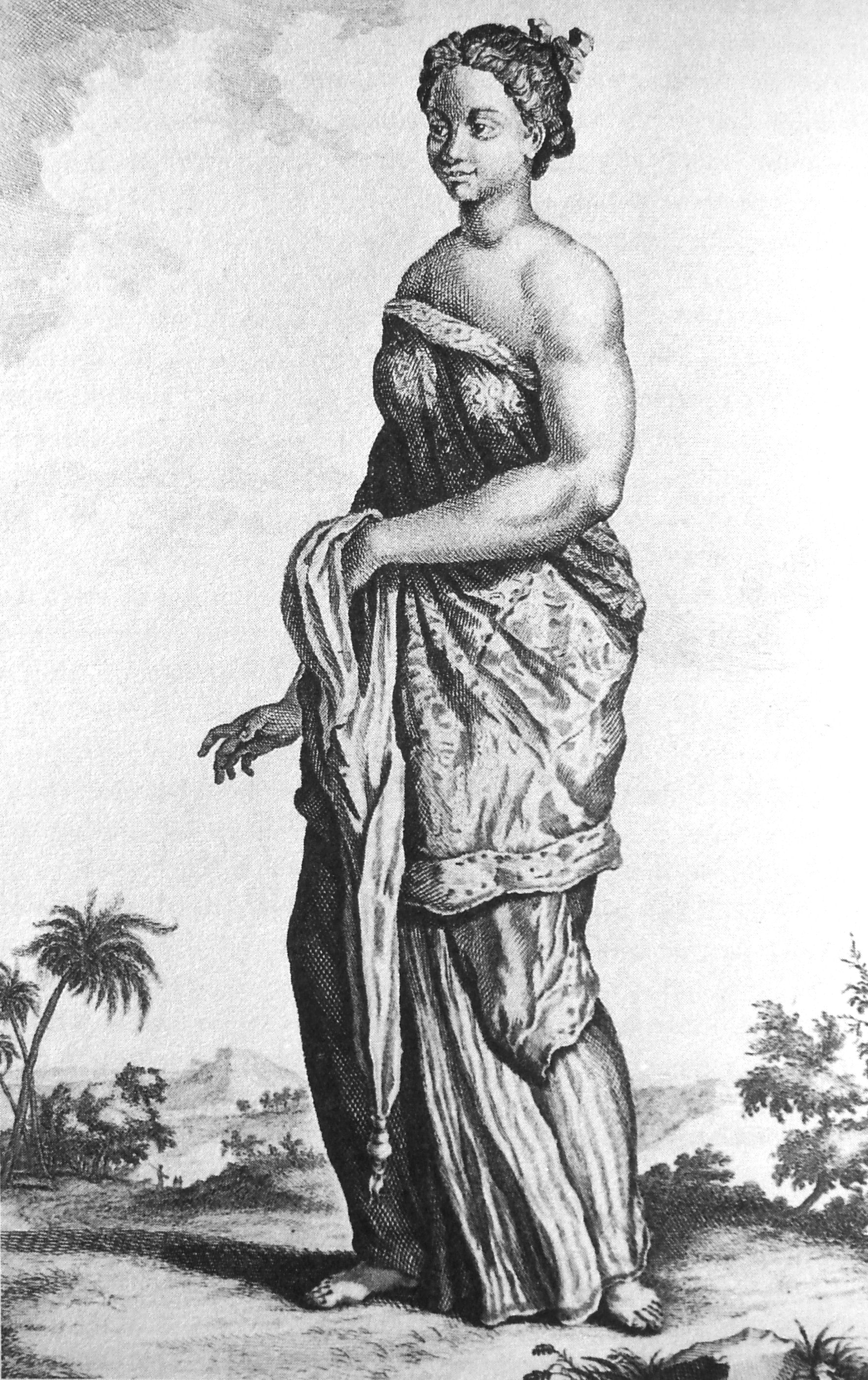
Many coolies and slaves were employed from outside Java.

Batavia, founded as the trade and administrative center of the VOC, was never intended to be a Dutch settlement. Jan Pieterszoon Coen founded Batavia for trade, with the city's inhabitants producing and supplying food. There was no migration of intact Dutch families, and there were few Dutch women in Batavia. A mixed society was formed; relationships between Dutchmen and Asian women did not usually result in marriage, and the women did not have the right to return to the Dutch Republic. This societal pattern created a group of mestizos in Batavia. Since the VOC preferred to maintain complete control of its business, a large number of slaves was employed.

Women became an important feature of Batavia's social network; they were accustomed to dealing with slaves, and spoke the same language (mostly Portuguese and Malay). Many of these women effectively became widows; their husbands left Batavia to return to the Netherlands, and their children were often removed as well.

Most of Batavia's residents were of Asian descent. Thousands of slaves were brought from India and Arakan; later, slaves were brought from Bali and Sulawesi. To avoid an uprising, a decision was made to free the Javanese people from slavery. Chinese people made up the largest group in Batavia (most being merchants and laborers), and were the most decisive group in the city's development. Other residents included Malays and Muslim and Hindu merchants from India.

Initially, these ethnic groups lived together; however, in 1688, segregation was imposed on the indigenous population. Each ethnic group was forced to live in its own village outside the city wall. Each person was tagged to identify their ethnic group; later, the identity tags were replaced with parchment.

Batavia experienced more malaria epidemics during the 18th century, as its marsh areas bred mosquitoes. The disease killed many Europeans and Batavia received the nickname "cemetery of Europeans". Wealthier European settlers moved to southern areas at higher elevations.

Within Batavia's walls, the wealthy Dutch built tall houses and canals. Commercial opportunities attracted Indonesian and Chinese immigrants, with the increasing population imposing a burden on the city. During the 18th century, over 60 percent of Batavia's population were slaves working for the VOC. Laws protected slaves against overly cruel actions by their masters; Christian slaves were freed after the death of their masters, and other slaves were allowed to own a store and earn money to buy their freedom.

Although Batavia became the political and administrative center of the Dutch East Indies and the main port in Southeast Asian trade, the city's population remained relatively small. Early-19th-century estimates of its population were smaller than that of Surabaya, although it overtook the latter by the end of the century; the 1920 census indicated a population of 306,000, compared to 192,000 for Surabaya, 158,000 for Semarang and 134,000 for Surakarta. Its population increased rapidly, exceeding half a million ten years later.

The population of the Dutch East Indies was never purely European. Of the 30,000 Dutch citizens in the Dutch East Indies in 1860, less than 5,000 were purely Dutch. Seventy percent of the population was male, since more male immigrants arrived from Europe.

Slavery existed in Batavia until its abolition in 1853. Slaves mainly lived in the back of the garden of the main house and were paid, with free food and lodging. Female slaves, known as baboe, cooked and cared for children.

Children went to school, where the teachers were locally trained. Many children did not finish school; to counter this, the school system awarded prizes to well-performing children.

When Stamford Raffles was governor of Java, he changed social interaction in Batavian society. Raffles disapproved of the relaxed Dutch dress code, where many men wore Javanese attire. Raffles and his wife, Olivia, introduced European dress (with much white, because of the tropical climate) for men and women.

When the British left Batavia in 1815, most of the native people reverted to their original Javanese attire but some new aspects persisted. Native males chosen to be the governing elite wore a European outfit on duty, but after hours they would change to sarongs and kebaya. Lower-ranked Dutchmen might wear the local style all day. Women wore sarongs and kebaya to official events, where they wore tighter-fitting robes or richly colored (or flowered) cloth—in the style of British India—and batik shawls.

== Notable people ==
- Souw Beng Kong (1580–1644), the first Kapitan Cina of Batavia.
- Untung Surapati (1660–1706), former Balinese slave from the city, imprisoned in the Stadhuis.
- Adriana Bake (1724–1787), first Indonesian-born first lady of Batavia
- Si Pitung (1866–1893), well-known 19th-century preman (bandit) from Batavia
- Mohammad Husni Thamrin (1894–1941), pre-independence Indonesian politician and nationalist
- Reinout Willem van Bemmelen (1904–1983), geologist
- Ben Bot (born 1937), diplomat and politician
- Tonke Dragt (1930–2024), writer and illustrator of children's literature
- Boudewijn de Groot (born 1944), musician
- Michel van Hulten (born 1930), politician
- Yvonne Keuls (1931-2025), writer
- Taco Kuiper (1941–2004), investigative journalist and publisher
- Carel Jan Schneider (1932–2011), foreign service diplomat and writer
- Francis Steinmetz (1914–2006), Royal Netherlands Navy officer
- Pehin Khatib Awang Abdul Latif bin Muhammad Taha, also known as Abdul Latif Taha (1771–1873), Bruneian muslim ulema
- Frans Tutuhatunewa (1923–2016), president of the Republic of South Maluku
- Henk Engelsman (1914–1979), lawyer and politician

== Works cited ==
- de Haan, F. (1922). Oud Batavia. Vol. 1. Batavia: G. Kolff & Co, Koninklijk Bataviaasch Genootschap van Kunsten en Wetenschappen.
- de Jong, J.J.P. (1998). De waaier van het fortuin: van handelscompagnie tot koloniaal imperium : de Nederlanders in Azië en de Indonesische archipel. Sdu. ISBN 9789012086431.
- Gunawan Tjahjono, ed. (1998). Architecture. Indonesian Heritage. Vol. 6. Singapore: Archipelago Press. ISBN 981-3018-30-5.
- Kaart van het Kasteel en de Stad Batavia in het Jaar 1667 [Map of the Castle and the City Batavia in year 1667] (Map) (Den Haag ed.). 50 rhijnlandsche roeden (in Dutch). Cartography by J.J. Bollee. G.B. Hooyer and J.W. Yzerman. 1919.
- Merrillees, Scott (2001). Batavia in Nineteenth Century Photographs. Singapore: Editions Didier Millet. ISBN 9789813018778.
- Mulyawan Karim, ed. (2009). Ekspedisi Ciliwung, Laporan Jurnalistik Kompas, Mata Air – Air Mata. Jakarta: PT. Kompas Media Nusantara. ISBN 978-9797094256.

Preceded by Jayakarta (Banten Sultanate)	History of Jakarta; 30 May 1619 – 27 December 1949	Succeeded by Jakarta (Republic of Indonesia)
Preceded by Amboina	Capital of the Dutch East India Company; 30 May 1619 – 1 January 1800	Succeeded by Itself as Capital of the Dutch East Indies
Preceded by Itself as Capital of the Dutch East India Company	Capital of the Dutch East Indies; 1 January 1800 – 27 December 1949	Succeeded by Jakarta as Capital of Indonesia
