= To Play or to Die =

Spelen of Sterven (To Play or to Die)
- DVD cover
- Directed by: Frank Krom
- Written by: Frank Krom; Anne van de Putte
- Story by: Anna Blaman
- Produced by: Maria Peters; Hans Pos; Dave Schram; Jose Steen
- Starring: Geert Hunaerts; Tjebbo Gerritsma
- Cinematography: Nils Post
- Edited by: Sander Vos
- Music by: Ferdinand Bakker; Kim Hayworth
- Distributed by: Shooting Star Film Distribution BV
- Release date: 1990
- Running time: 50 minutes
- Country: Netherlands
- Language: Dutch

To Play or to Die (Dutch: Spelen of Sterven) is a 1990 Dutch gay-related psychological drama film directed by Frank Krom in his directorial debut and co-written by Krom and Anne van de Putte based on a story by Anna Blaman.

== Plot ==
In this short motion picture, schoolboy Kees is intelligent, introvert and sensitive, but gets ridiculed verbally and physically at an all-boys school by classmates and teachers, especially in gym.

His awakening sexual interest goes to boys, and in particular to Charel, a beautiful athletic classmate who probably feels an undetermined interest but would never risk admitting (possibly not even to himself) having any gay or bi appreciation, least of all for a 'sissy', and thus remains unresponsive to shy Kees' overtures. When the hunk finally comes over to Kees place while his parents are away, a tragic twist is in the making as the ending shows Kees taking control by devising a plan of revenge against Charel.

== Cast ==
- Geert Hunaerts as Kees van Wouden
- Tjebbo Gerritsma as Charel
- Joost Hienen as Charel's friend
- Cock van der Lee as Charel's friend
- Mike Starink as Charel's friend
- Marc van Uchelen as Charel's friend
- Diane Lensink as Mother
- Wim Van Der Grijn as Father
- Hilde Van Mieghem as French Teacher
- Titus Muizelaar as Phys. Ed. Teacher
- Simon Gribling as Math Teacher

== Home media ==
The film was originally released on VHS in the United Kingdom in 1993 as part of a collection of three short films titled Boys on Film 2. It was released on DVD in 1999 in the United States under the English title To Play or To Die.

== Reception ==
Bruce Steele wrote in The Advocate that foreign-film lovers will be pleased "with this stylish, gripping festival favorite about a Dutch boys' school misfit and his ill-fated crush on an athletic classmate." LA Weekly noted that the film is an "intense enigmatic psychological drama where powerful bullies and sadomasochistic games are stock in trade." They also said the ending is a "difficult and painful pas de deux with surprising results."

Film critic Kevin Thomas stated this film "is a subtle, hypnotic drama in which a slight, studious youth is confronted with his true nature in devastating fashion, for he is hopelessly drawn to the class bully who also happens to be remarkably handsome." He further opined that "the psychological insight, the details and nuances, the superb acting and the exquisite sense of style that characterize this film make it a small-scale masterpiece."

Critic Adam Groves opined that "it starts off like a typical adolescent whine fest" but when Kees invites Charel over, "hoping to exact revenge, he gets far more than he bargained for; in the final reel the film takes an unexpected dive into Kees disturbed psyche, with an increasingly surreal veneer that calls into question the reality of all that came before; it all adds up to a troubling yet compelling concoction that’s harsh, intelligent and thoroughly unpredictable."

== See also ==
- Cinema of the Netherlands
- List of Dutch films
- List of LGBTQ-related films
