= Henk Engelsman =

Dutch politician

Temporary Member of the Schiedam Municipal Council
- In office 1945–1946

Member of the Schiedam Municipal Council
- In office 1946–1965
- In office 1978–1979

Member of the Provincial Council of South Holland
- In office 1956–1978

Member of the House of Representatives (Netherlands) (Tweede Kamer der Staten-Generaal)
- In office 1958–1959
- In office 1962–1967

Member of the Rijnmondraad
- In office 1965–1970

Committee member and deputy chairman of the Openbaar Lichaam Rijnmond
- In office 1965–1970

Member of the Provincial Council of South Holland
- In office 1970–1978

Personal details
- Born: Hendrik Barend Engelsman; 9 December 1914 Batavia, Dutch East Indies
- Died: 21 September 1979 (aged 64) Schiedam, The Netherlands
- Party: Partij van de Arbeid (Labour Party)
- Website: http://www.parlement.com/id/vg09ll0hhuya/h_b_henk_engelsman

Hendrik Barend (Henk) Engelsman (9 December 1914, Batavia, Dutch East Indies - 21 September 1979) was a Dutch lawyer, civil servant, social-democratic politician and director.

After World War II, he was active in the Dutch post-war political investigation (Politieke Opsporingsdienst) and was appointed as a temporary, non-party member of the Municipal Council of Schiedam in November 1945. In 1946 he was elected to the Municipal Council, as a member of the Partij van de Arbeid (Labour Party). He also worked as a lawyer, first at the Ministerie van Handel en Nijverheid (Ministry of Trade and Industry) (around 1947) and later at the Ministerie van Economische Zaken (Ministry of Economics) as Secretary and Department Head. From 1956 until 1978 he was a member of the Provincial Council of South Holland.

Engelsman was appointed to the House of Representatives (Netherlands) (Tweede Kamer der Staten-Generaal) as an interim member for the first time in October 1958. After several years, he was appointed as an interim member of the House for a second time in 1962. However, in 1963 he was directly elected for a full four-year term, until 1967. During that time, he returned to his position as principal administrator at the Ministerie van Economische Zaken. In the House he was occupied with a wide range of topics, such as the Civil Service Tribunal, local government policies, education policy(leerplicht(Compulsory Education)), wealth creation, finance, justice (such as Algemene termijnenwet, rules on brokers) and economics (pricing). In 1965, he participated in the drafting of the Wet algemeen burgerlijk pensioenfonds (General Law Civil Pension Fund).

In 1965, he swapped his Schiedam council position for the Rijnmondraad, a public body for the region at the mouth of the Rhine, where he was both a committee member and Deputy Chairman. In 1970, he assumed a new position as a legislator in the province of South Holland, where he was responsible for environmental, social and economic issues, which he would fulfill for eight years. He then returned to the Schiedam Municipal Council, where he remain for a year until his death.

Engelsman married Topy Flink in May 1944. In 1978, he became a Knight in the Order of the Netherlands Lion.
