= Jetske Reinou van der Malen =

Dutch poet (1681–1752)

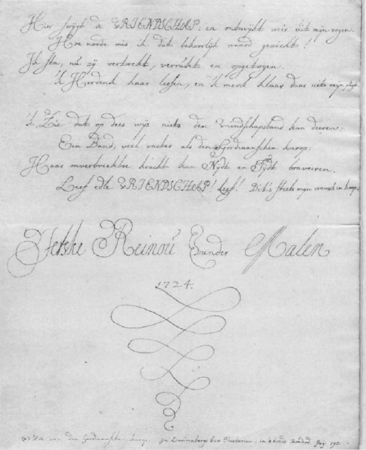
Van der Malen's signature, 1724

Jetske Reinou van der Malen (bap. 23 October 1681 – 9 March 1752) was a Dutch poet.

== Biography ==
Van der Malen was baptised on 23 October 1681 in Leeuwarden, Friesland, the Netherlands, however references works record her birth year as 1687. Her father Michael van der Malen was a lawyer at the Court of Friesland, president of the Frisian-Nassau Military Court, and alderman of Leeuwarden from 1686 to 1689. After her fathers death in 1691, her mother Rixt van der Malen (née de Horn) remarried to Johannes Hemsterhuis, professor of medicine in Franeker, in 1694.

Van der Malen published her first poem in print in 1709, a praise poem to Dutch prince and stadtholder Johan Wilhelm Friso of Orange-Nassau. Following the Peace of Utrecht (1713), the treaty which ended the War of the Spanish Succession, van der Malen wrote in her poetry about the suffering caused by war and how this made her thankful for God's mercy.

In 1728, van der Malen published her only collection of poetry, Zede-, Mengel- en Lykdichten. In this work, she wrote a praise poem to Katharyne Lescailje, who had died in 1711.

In Aurelia Zwartte's poem Stichtelijke Poëzij (1727), Zwartte referred to her contemporary and friend van der Malen as an "excellent poetess." In 1810, Dutch literary historian Jeronimo de Vries [nl] described van der Malen's poetry as possessing "a firmness and liveliness that was not found among the best Poets of her time."

Van der Malen died on 9 March 1752 in Leeuwarden, Friesland, the Netherlands.
