= Yvonne Kroonenberg =

Dutch psychologist and author (born 1950)

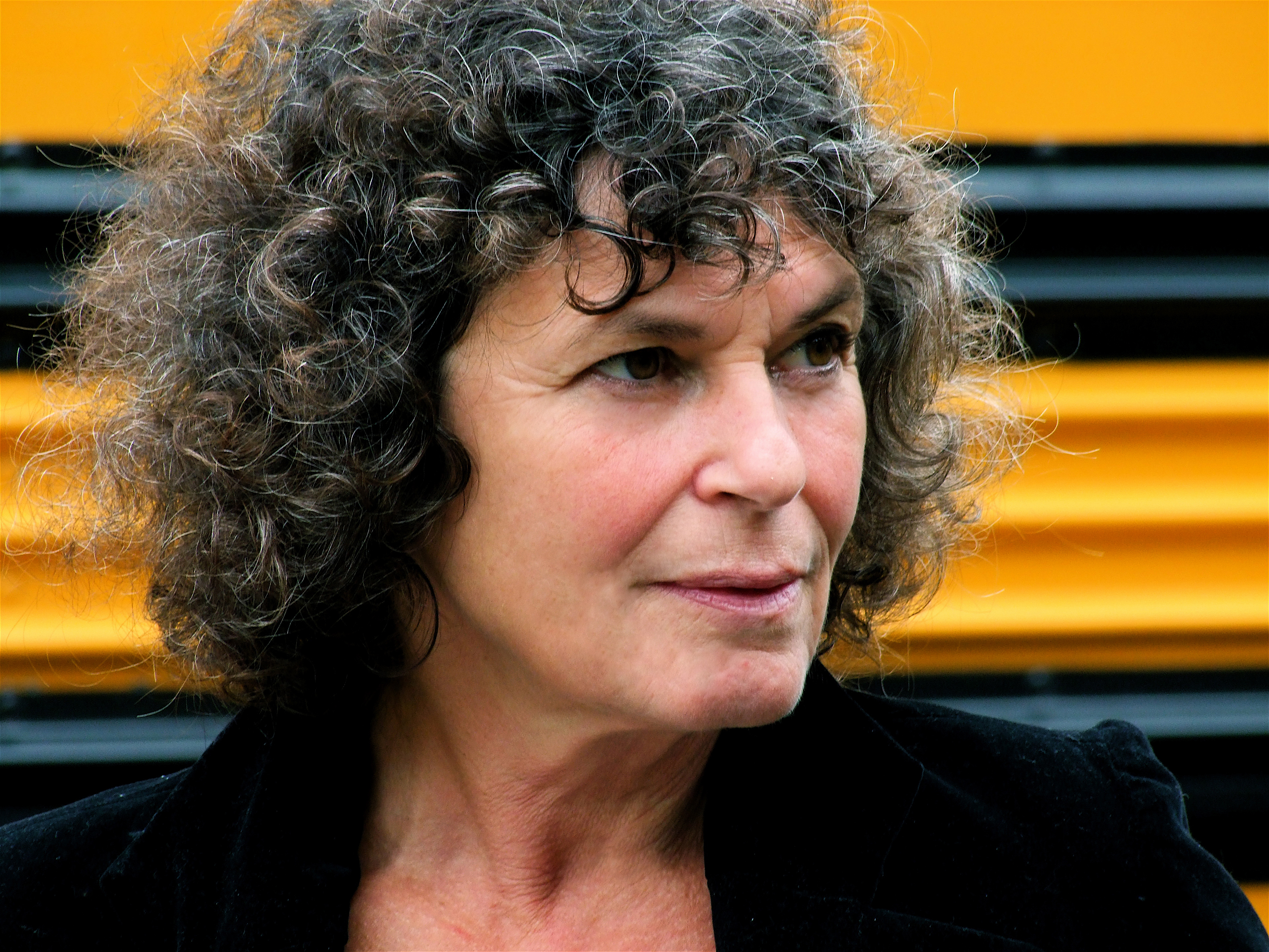
- Education: Psychology
- Writing career
- Notable work: Alles went behalve een vent

Yvonne Kroonenberg (born 31 May 1950) is a Dutch psychologist and author. Her best known book is Alles went behalve een vent ("One gets used to anything, except a guy").

== Biography ==
Alles went behalve een vent ("One gets used to anything, except a guy"), pwas ublished in 1998 (ISBN 90-254-6780-6)) and translated into German in 2001 as Man gewöhnt sich an alles, nur nicht an einen Mann (ISBN 3-492-23257-4). The book is a collection of columns highlighting idiosyncrasies of all sorts of men—equally making fun of typical reactions of women to such male behaviour. The book was a hit in the Netherlands and Flanders in the 1990s, for its unusual approach: Kroonenberg's blunt, funny depictions of typical male vs. female situations bridged the gender gap rather than exacerbated that divide.

In April 2014, Kroonenburg became the center of controversy after an interview in HP/De Tijd. In this interview she described people from the town of Assen, as well as people in Amsterdam North and people who would visit the 'Action' discount store, as inferior life forms as opposed to herself, who would be analysing the composer Mahler. In an 'apology' she put the blame on "the media", which then led to an integral audio of what she had said to be put on the internet which showed she was correctly cited.
