= Aurelia Zwartte =

Dutch poet

Aurelia Zwartte (baptised 1682) was a Dutch poet.

== Career ==
Aurelia Zwartte was baptised on 22 August 1682 in Groningen, the Netherlands. She was the daughter of Hendrik Zwartte, a secretary in Groningen and judge in Bellingwolde, and his wife Titia Verrutius van Wartinga. She married Jacobus van Aelst in the village of Mensigeweer in 1705, then remarried to Justus Johannes van Beilanus in Abcoude, Utrecht, in 1715.

When writing a response to an admirer of her her poetry, Zwartte wrote of how she was constantly burdened with household chores and therefore read while she cleaning fish and writing while sewing.

In her poem Stichtelijke Poëzij (1727), Zwartte referred to fellow Dutch writer Jetske Reinou van der Malen an "excellent poetess." She also urges her husband to Christian patience in all social adversity. The work was dedicated to Maria Louise van Hessen-Kassel, widow of Stadtholder Johan Willem Friso, and it is unknown if she continued to write poetry after 1727.

Zwartte's date of death is uncertain, recorded in some sources as 1768.
