= Mieke Mosmuller =

Dutch medical doctor, author, and novelist

Mieke Mosmuller-Crull (born 1951 in Amsterdam as Mieke Crull) is a Dutch medical doctor, author, and novelist. Since 1994, she has written a number of books in Dutch, German, English, and Danish on themes related to Rudolf Steiner's anthroposophy.

== Biography ==
Mosmuller was a student at the Barlaeus Gymnasium in Amsterdam and then began a study of medicine at the University of Amsterdam. Together with her husband Jos Mosmuller, she began a practice as a general practitioner and opened an apothecary in Sittard.

== Publications in English ==
- The Living Rudolf Steiner. Apologia. Occident Publishers, 2013.
- Seek the Light that Rises in the West. Occident Publishers, 2012.
- Wisdom is a Woman. (A Novel.) Occident Publishers, 2015.
- The art of thinking. Occident Publishers, 2016.
- Inferno. Occident Publishers, 2020.
- Singularity. Dialogues on artificial intelligence and spirituality. Occident Publishers, 2021.
- Posthumanism – About the future of mankind. Occident Publishers, 2022.
- How to Think!. Occident Publishers, 2024.

== Publications in German ==
- Suche das Licht, das im Abendlande aufgeht. Occident Verlag, Den Haag 1994, ISBN 978-90-75240-02-3.
- Der deutsche Geist. Occident Verlag, Baarle-Nassau 2000, ISBN 978-90-75240-09-2.
- Mutter eines Königs. Occident Verlag, Baarle-Nassau 2006, ISBN 978-3-00-013367-1.
- Die Weisheit ist eine Frau. Occident Verlag, Baarle-Nassau 2006, ISBN 978-3-00-018637-0.
- Der Heilige Gral. Occident Verlag, Baarle-Nassau 2007, ISBN 978-3-00-021871-2.
- Stigmata und Geist-Erkenntnis. Judith von Halle versus Rudolf Steiner. Occident Verlag, Baarle-Nassau 2008, ISBN 978-3-00-023291-6.
- Inferno. Occident Verlag, Baarle-Nassau 2008, ISBN 978-3-00-025953-1.
- Eine Klasse voller Engel. Über die Erziehungskunst. Occident Verlag, Baarle-Nassau 2009, ISBN 978-3-00-043548-5.
- Arabeske – Das Integral Ken Wilbers. Occident Verlag, Baarle-Nassau 2009, ISBN 978-3-00-028629-2.
- Himmlische Rose. Occident Verlag, Baarle-Nassau 2010, ISBN 978-3-00-032790-2.
- Das Tor zur geistigen Welt. Occident Verlag, Baarle-Nassau 2010, ISBN 978-3-00-030934-2.
- Meditation. Occident Verlag, Baarle-Nassau 2010, ISBN 978-3-00-030934-2.
- Das menschliche Mysterium. Bildekräfte, Lebenskräfte, Gestaltung des menschlichen Leibes. Occident Verlag, Baarle-Nassau 2011, ISBN 978-3-00-034035-2.
- Anschauen des Denkens. Occident Verlag, Baarle-Nassau 2011, ISBN 978-3-00-034669-9.
- Rudolf Steiner, Eine spirituelle Biographie. Occident Verlag, Baarle-Nassau 2011, ISBN 978-3-00-036201-9.
- Johannes, Dialoge über die Einweihung. Occident, Baarle-Nassau 2012.
- Begreifen des Denkens. Occident Verlag, Baarle-Nassau 2012, ISBN 978-3-00-038134-8.
- Ich mache was ich will! Freiheitsphilosophie für junge Menschen. Occident Verlag, Baarle-Nassau 2012, ISBN 978-3-00-040434-4.
- Ein Kind ist eine sichtbar gewordene Liebe. Occident Verlag, Baarle-Nassau 2013, ISBN 978-3-00-041847-1.
- Die Kategorien des Aristoteles. Die Buchstaben des Weltenwortes. Occident Verlag, Baarle-Nassau 2013, ISBN 978-3-00-043873-8.
- Anthroposophie und die Kategorien des Aristoteles. Occident Verlag, Baarle-Nassau 2014, ISBN 978-3-00-045310-6.
- Die Verwandlung des Denkens. Occident Verlag, Baarle-Nassau 2014, ISBN 978-3-00-045878-1.
- Königsweg. Occident Verlag, Baarle-Nassau 2014, ISBN 978-3-00-046854-4.
- Lebendiges Denken. Occident Verlag, Baarle-Nassau 2015, ISBN 978-3-00-048841-2.
- Philosophische Reflexionen 2014 - 2015. Occident Verlag, Baarle-Nassau 2015, ISBN 978-3-00-050262-0.
- Chartres. Ein anderer Blick auf die Kathedrale. Occident Verlag, Baarle-Nassau 2015, ISBN 978-3-00-051079-3.
- Der Himmel auf Erden. Occident Verlag, Baarle-Nassau 2015, ISBN 978-3-00-051901-7.
- Persephone - Natura. Die Überwindung der Maja. Occident Verlag, Baarle-Nassau 2016, ISBN 978-3-00-052304-5.
- Die Kunst des Denkens. Occident Verlag, Baarle-Nassau 2016, ISBN 978-3-946699-00-2.
- Adam Kadmon. Occident Verlag, Baarle-Nassau 2016, ISBN 978-3-946699-01-9.
- Vom Himmel hoch. Die Engel-Hierarchien und der Mensch. Occident Verlag, Baarle-Nassau 2016, ISBN 978-3-946699-03-3.
- Die Anthroposophische Bewegung. Occident Verlag, Baarle-Nassau 2017, ISBN 978-3-946699-04-0.
- Impressionen aus dem Tod. Occident Verlag, Baarle-Nassau 2017, ISBN 978-3-946699-05-7.
- Über die Hierarchien der Engel. Die dritte Hierarchie. Occident Verlag, Baarle-Nassau 2017, ISBN 978-3-946699-06-4.
- Der Graf von Saint Germain und die Musik. Occident Verlag, Baarle-Nassau 2018, ISBN 978-3-946699-07-1.
- Die Schöpfung aus dem Nichts. Kontemplation. Occident Verlag, Baarle-Nassau 2018, ISBN 978-3-946699-08-8.
- Über die Hierarchien der Engel. Die zweite Hierarchie. Occident Verlag, Baarle-Nassau 2018, ISBN 978-3-946699-09-5.
- Singularität. Dialog über künstliche Intelligenz und Spiritualität. Occident Verlag, Baarle-Nassau 2019, ISBN 978-3-946699-10-1.
- Alte und neue Mystik. Occident Verlag, Baarle-Nassau 2019, ISBN 978-3-946699-11-8.
- Über die Hierarchien der Engel. Die erste Hierarchie. Occident Verlag, Baarle-Nassau 2019, ISBN 978-3-946699-12-5.
- Posthumanismus. Über die Zukunft des Menschen. Occident Verlag, Baarle-Nassau 2020, ISBN 978-3-946699-13-2.
- Ethischer Individualismus versus Kommunikatives Handeln. Kritik an Habermas' Theorie. Occident Verlag, Baarle-Nassau 2020, ISBN 978-3-946699-14-9.
- Die Apokalypse. Drei Anschauungen. Occident Verlag, Baarle-Nassau 2020, ISBN 978-3-946699-16-3.
- Lotus und Lilie. Dialog zwischen einem Buddhisten und einem Christen. Occident Verlag, Baarle-Nassau 2021, ISBN 978-3-946699-15-6.
- Lerne Denken!. Occident Verlag, Baarle-Nassau 2022, ISBN 978-3-946699-17-0.
- Lerne Fühlen!. Occident Verlag, Baarle-Nassau 2022, ISBN 978-3-946699-19-4.
- Seelenkalender - mit Einführungen von Mieke Mosmuller. Occident Verlag, Baarle-Nassau 2022, ISBN 978-3-946699-18-7.
- Zarte Vertröstung - Die Erscheinung von Christus in der ätherischen Welt. Occident Verlag, Baarle-Nassau 2022, ISBN 978-3-946699-20-0
- Tun!. Occident Verlag, Baarle-Nassau 2023, ISBN 978-3-946699-22-4.
- Elementarwesen - auf geisteswissenschaftlicher Grundlage. Occident Verlag, Baarle-Nassau 2023, ISBN 978-3-946699-23-1.
- Bittersüßer Schmerz - Die Erscheinung Christi in der ätherischen Welt. Occident Verlag, Baarle-Nassau 2023, ISBN 978-3-946699-24-8.
- Freundschaft. Occident Verlag, Baarle-Nassau 2024, ISBN 978-3-946699-25-5.
