= Cornelia van der Veer =

Dutch poet

Cornelia van der Veer (born Amsterdam, 30 August 1639 - buried there 18 October 1704) was a Dutch poet. Along with Catharina Questiers and Katharyne Lescailje she was the most successful female Dutch poet of the second half of the 17th century.
