= David Questiers =

Dutch poet

David Questiers (2 February 1623 – 17 April 1663) was a Dutch poet. Questiers was born and died in Amsterdam, and was the brother of the noted poet Catharina Questiers.
