= Marith Iedema =

Dutch journalist and writer (born 1989)

Marith Anna Iedema
- Born: Marith Anna Iedema; 23 January 1989 (age 37) Groningen, Netherlands
- Years active: 2015–present
- Notable works: (S)experimenteren, Mijn lust en mijn leven

Marith Anna Iedema (Groningen, 23 January 1989) is a Dutch journalist and writer.

== Biography ==
Marith Iedema was born in Groningen, but grew up in Amsterdam. She graduated from the School of Journalism in Utrecht and started her career on the web editorial team of de Volkskrant. She left that position to fully dedicate herself to covering topics related to love, relationships, and sex. Besides her work as a journalist, she has worked as a model for more than ten years, both in the Netherlands and internationally. Iedema lives in Amsterdam with her partner and son. She is an advocate for sexual freedom and pleasure for women. In 2021, she was diagnosed with breast cancer, which significantly altered her life and became a major subject of her writing.

== Columns ==
Iedema wrote a weekly column for Nieuwe Revu from 2016 until 2020. Since 2022, she has been writing a weekly column for VROUW.

== Bibliography ==
Iedema debuted as an author with (S)experimenteren. In this book, she candidly and humorously discusses her love life and explores the ideal form of a relationship. Three years later, she published Mijn lust en mijn leven, in which she humorously and honestly discusses the impact of pregnancy and a baby on her love life.

- (S)experimenteren, Prometheus 2018
- Mijn lust en mijn leven, Prometheus 2021

== Other activities ==
- Publications for newspapers and magazines (including Algemeen Dagblad, VIVA, Grazia, Oh Magazine, Playboy, and Glamour).
- Documentary series for Linda TV (Un)usual Sex
- Educational videos for Easytoys
- Erotic podcast Charlie's Adventures
- Podcast In Search of Sexuality with Nynke Nijman
- Regular guest on Cirque Erotique radio SLAM.fm
- Active with Instagram account @marithiedema
