= Anna Blaman =

Dutch writer and poet

Johanna Petronella Vrugt
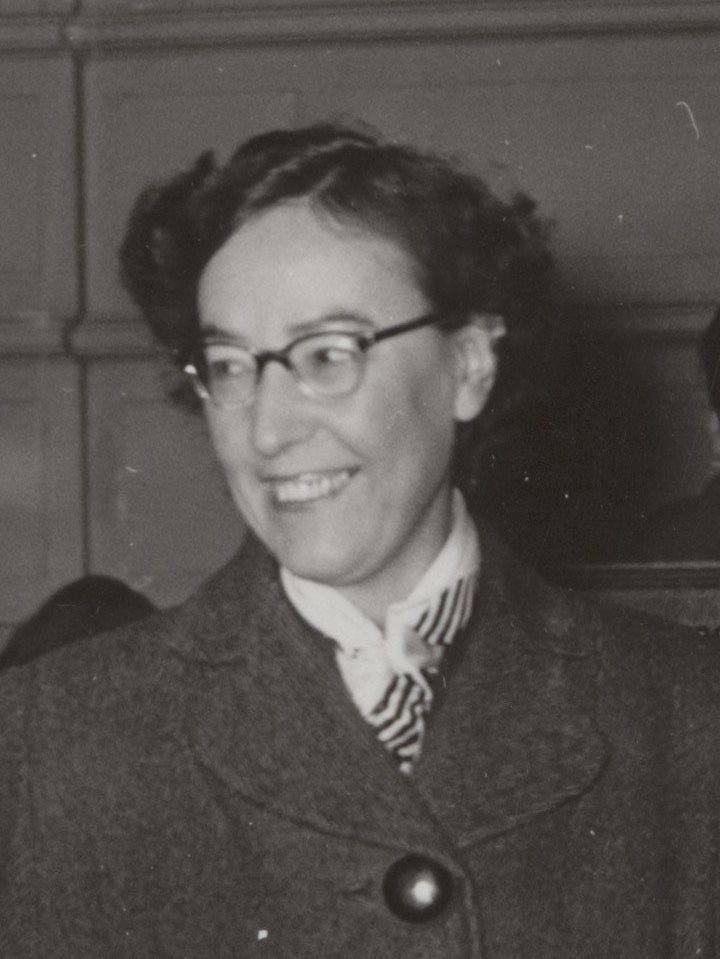
- Blaman (1955)
- Born: Johanna Petronella Vrugt; 31 January 1905; Rotterdam
- Died: 13 July 1960 (aged 55); Rotterdam
- Occupation: writer
- Writing career
- Pen name: Anna Blaman
- Notable works: A matter of life and death (Engl.translation 1974)
- Notable awards: P. C. Hooft Award
- Website: dbnl

Anna Blaman, pseudonym of Johanna Petronella Vrugt, (31 January 1905 – 13 July 1960) was a Dutch writer and poet. She was a recipient of the P. C. Hooft Award. The literary award Anna Blaman Prijs is named after her.

== Biography ==
The daughter of Pieter Jacob Vrugt and Johanna Karolina Wessels, she was born in Rotterdam. Vrugt studied French and went on to teach French in high school. Vrugt lived most of her adult life in her mother's boarding house.

She began publishing poetry in the literary magazines Criterium and Helikon. In 1941, she published her first novel Vrouw en vriend (Woman and friend). This was followed by Eenzaam avontuur (Lonely adventure) in 1948. She published a novella De kruisvaarder (The Crusader) in 1950 and two books of short stories Ram Horna in 1951 and Overdag in 1957. The novel Op leven en dood (A Matter of Life and Death) was published in 1954.

The "nom de plume" Anna Blaman may have been derived from the name of Alie Bosch, a nurse who treated Vrugt for a kidney disease. The author fell in love with Bosch; although Bosch left to live with a dancing teacher, they did become friends again later in life.

She received the P. C. Hooft Award in 1956.

Her last novel De verliezers (The losers) remained uncompleted but was published posthumously in 1974.

Vrugt died in Rotterdam at the age of 55 of a cerebral embolism.

As a high-profile public figure who was openly homosexual, she helped open doors for Dutch lesbians.

The 1990 Dutch film Spelen of sterven (English title To Play or to Die) was based on one of her stories.

== Publication (in English) ==
- Anna Blaman: A matter of life and death. Transl. by Adrienne Dixon; introd. by Egbert Krispyn. New York, Twayne, 1974. ISBN 0-8057-3441-4
