= Katharyne Lescailje =

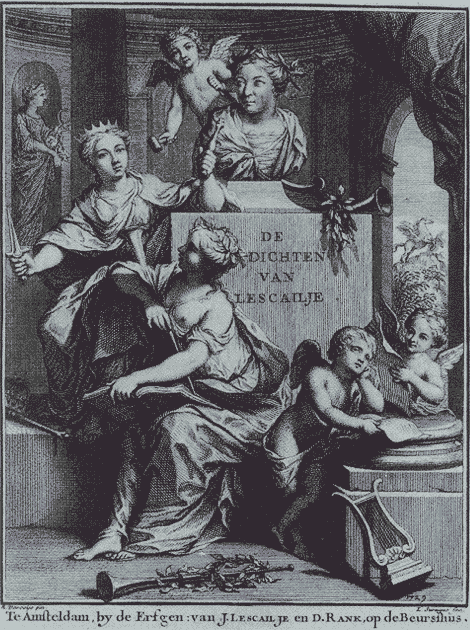
Titlepage of Katharina Lescailje's 3-part collection of poetry, called "Toneel- en mengelpoëzy", 1731.

Katharyne Lescailje or Catharina Lescaille (September 26, 1649 in Amsterdam – June 8, 1711) was a Dutch poet, translator and Publisher. Along with Catharina Questiers and Cornelia van der Veer she was the most successful female Dutch poet of the second half of the 17th century.

== Biography ==
She was the daughter of the Amsterdam publisher Jacob Lescailje, who married Aeltje Verwou and moved from Dordrecht to Amsterdam to start printing books in 1645 in a house on Dam Square called "Huis onder het zeil" (House under sail). Katharina's parents were friends with the writers Jan Vos, Joost van den Vondel and Gerard Brandt. In 1658 Jacob Lescailje became the exclusive publisher for the Amsterdam Theatre. Katharina, who never married, and her sisters continued his business after he died in 1677. She started publishing her own translations of French plays (Kassandra in 1684, Genserik in 1685, and Herodes en Marianne in 1685) and also wrote and exchanged poems among friends. She was honored with a book of poetry dedicated to her in 1685 by the Groningen poet Ludolph Smids.

Her sister Barbara married the German bookbinder Matthias de Wreedt who helped with the business and who left their share to their daughter Susanna, who married Dirk Rank and added his name to the printing label in 1712. By 1731, when the poetry bundle of Katharina was published, the fortunes of the publisher were waning and they lost their privilege to print the texts for the Schouwburg.

She specialized in political poems, and wrote several light comedies that were played in Amsterdam throughout the 18th century. Twenty years after her death, in 1731, her collected works were published, becoming one of the first female poets in the Netherlands with her own collected works. Her poetry occupied three large volumes of nearly 1000 pages and was reprinted some years later.

She was commemorated in a praise poem by Jetske Reinou van der Malen in 1727.
