= Catharina Questiers =

Dutch poet and dramatist

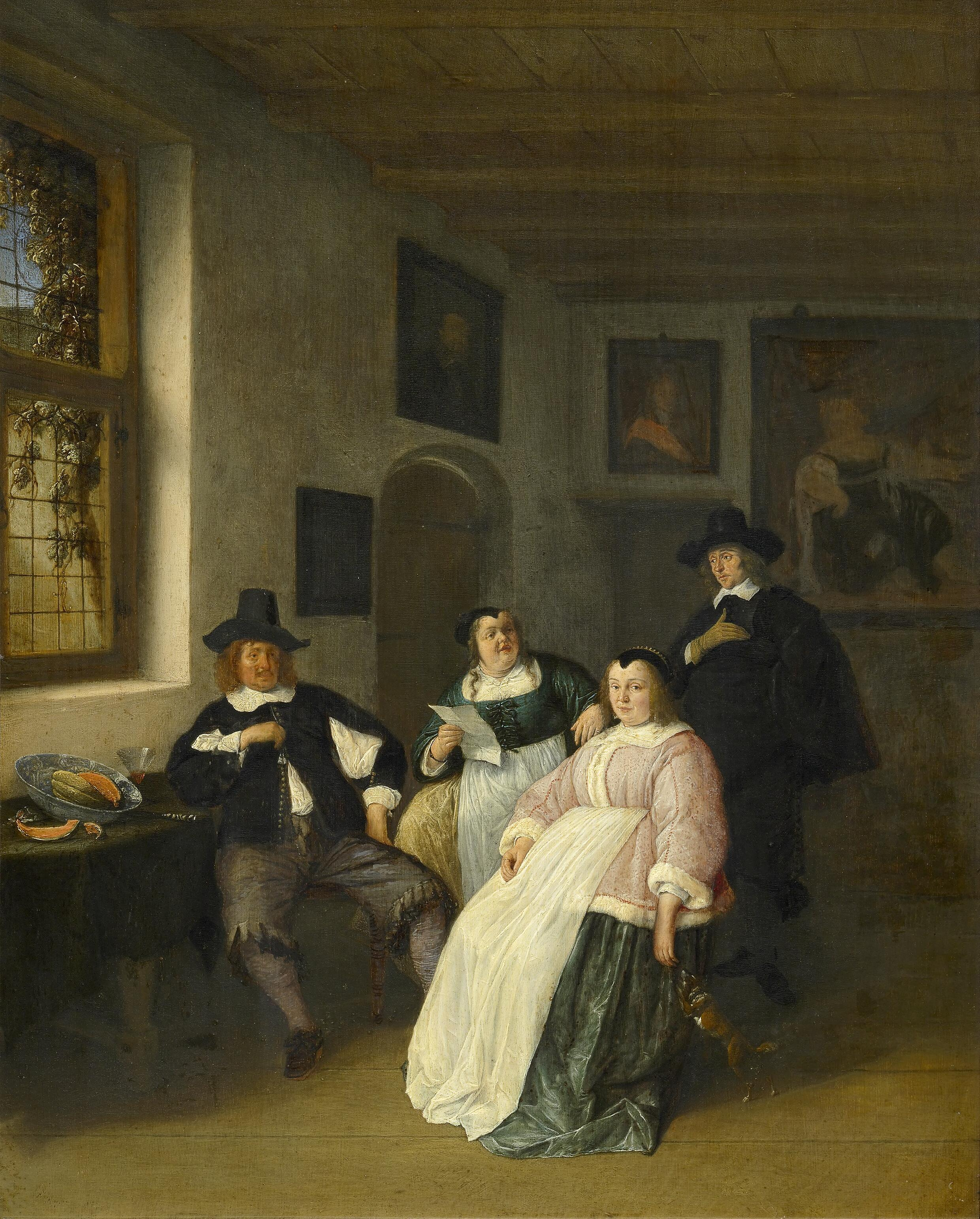
Catharina Questiers reading a poem (with paper in hand), by Adriaen van Ostade.

Catharina Questiers (21 November 1631 – 3 February 1669) was a Dutch poet and dramatist. Along with Cornelia van der Veer and Katharyne Lescailje, she was the most successful female Dutch poet of the second half of the 17th century. Her brother David also achieved some note as a poet.

== Family ==
Catharina Questiers was born and died in Amsterdam. Her parents were Salomon Davidsz. Questiers (1590–1636) and Elisabeth Jan (1593–1660). The family originally came from the Flemish Ypres. Her father had a thriving plumbing business in Amsterdam Warmoesstraat. Catherine was the youngest of 6 children born in the house, and was suspected to come from a Roman Catholic background. However, it was unusual for those who practice Catholicism to leave Catholic Brabant and move to Amsterdam, so their religious background is questionable.

Her father's business made their family relatively wealthy, so they had a good life. Her father was not only a business man, but had influence and prestige in the theatrical and literary arts. He was a member of the Brabant "Chamber of Rhetoric", White Lavender, a member of Coster's Academy, and a playwright. He wrote a play called Griecxen Amadis that was performed numerous times in what was at the time the most prestigious theatre, the Academy on the Keizersgracht.

== Career ==
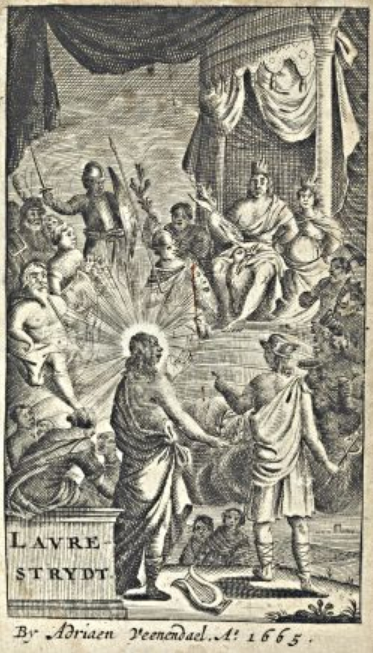
Illustration in: Lauwer-stryt tusschen Catharina Questiers en Cornelia van der Veer (1665).

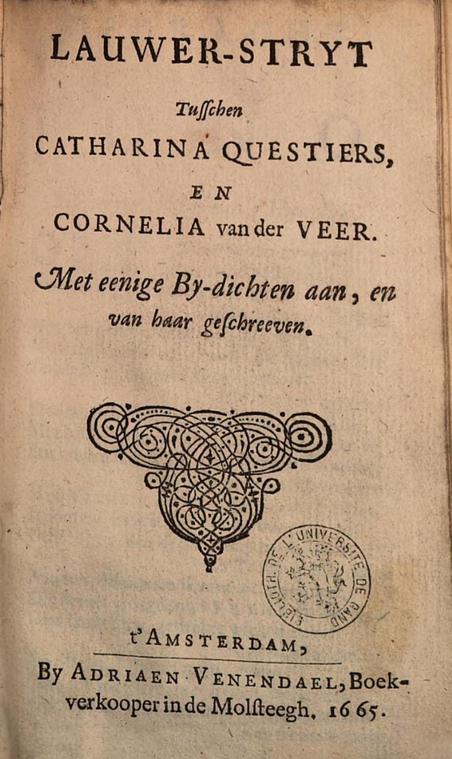
Title page of Lauwer-stryt tusschen Catharina Questiers en Cornelia van der Veer (1665).

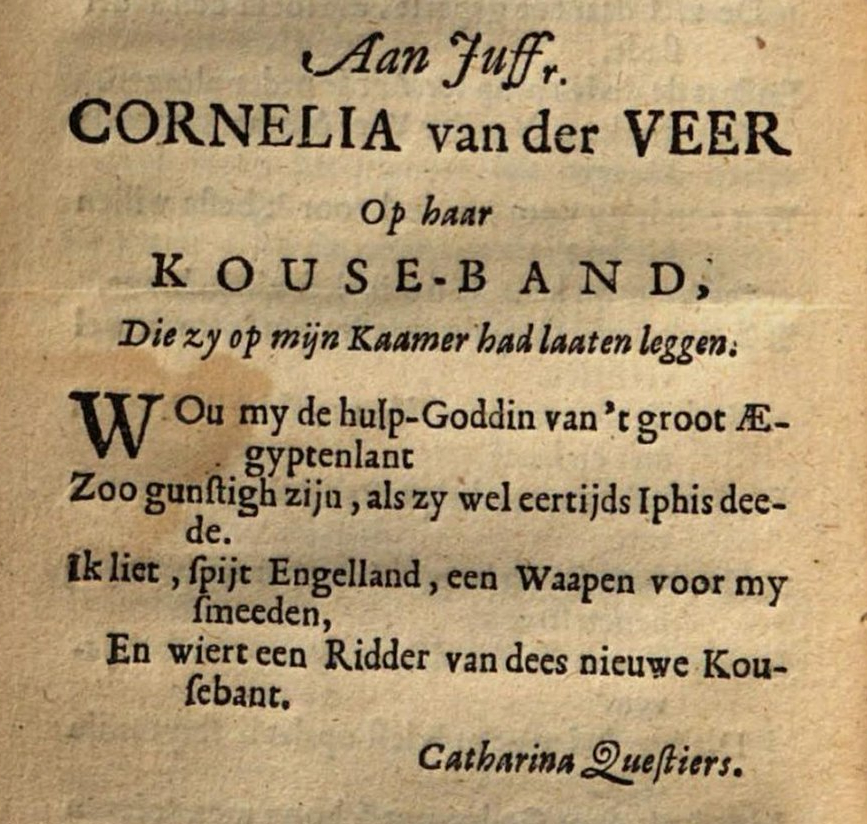
Poem about Cornelia van der Veer's garter. In: Lauwer-stryt (1665).

Catharina wrote her first poem with her brother, David, when she was 8 years old. She continued to mold her craft until her first work appeared in “Corpse’s Complaint”, written after the death of her admired and well esteemed friend and poet, Tesselschade Roemersdr Visscher. The poem appeared in JacobViverius, “Wintery Nights”.

Catharina Questiers began making a name for herself when she began writing plays for the Dutch Republic. At the time, Spanish plays were revered for their love triangles and spectacular action scenes. “Her first play, The geheymen lover, had an operation on an existing verse to prose translation of the Spanish comedy las mujeres vieran No. of Lope de Vega (history.com-Malou Nozeman).” She dedicated her first play to Queen Christina because she was well educated and knew Dutch, though she was not from Amsterdam. Her second play was, “cashmere” or muffled to high, was modeled this play after Spanish prose as well. It was first performed on October 25, 1656. This play in particular earned Catharina a great deal more prestige and fame, because Amsterdam's first professional actress Ariana Nozeman starred in the play. The talk of her play gained so much attention that the Amsterdam city council attended a performance.

When Catharina first began writing plays for the Republic, she was the youngest person to ever do so. Furthermore, she was one of the first female writers of her time, which created a great deal of interest amongst her male co-authors. Actor and playwright Jan van Daalen wrote in the preliminaries, "How a woman's image can make such heifers,” alluding to Catharina Questiers for the first play that she'd written for the Republic.

== Other activities ==
Catherina was a poet and playwright as well as a versatile visual artist. She and her brother, David, worked in copper and wood engraving, drawing, sculpture, embroidery, and paper cutting. Engravings by Catherina appeared in Olipodrigo (1654), edited by Nozeman, and were used to illustrate both her own poems and those of her brother.

== Life as a single woman ==
Catharina Questiers married at the age of 34, which was relatively unusual at the time. Artists who painted her commented upon her appearance. Van De Vondel calls Catharina "de schone Katharyn” (the beautiful Katharyn). However, Constantijn Huygens offers a contrasting opinion; in a letter he writes that she was ‘the big fat one in Amsterdam’. Paintings of Catharina, especiallyin particular, paintings done by both Van De Vondel's, and Adriaen van Ostade's, Catherina is illustrated as a somewhat over-weight woman. There is a slight possibility that her outward appearance had was the reason for her being married at 34, only four years before her death. All of her sisters married before her. “Maria (1614/15- 1677) married Henry Goyer, sheriff of Heemstede, bailiff and later dike warden of the island of Texel. Petronella (1620/21-1677), married the famous Amsterdam and builder Philip Vingboons Aaltje (1618/19 - 1680) with the notary Quirijn Spit Hoff.” Catharina's reason for not marrying so quickly was that she loved her freedom. She'd often say, “I love my freedom”, in response to questions of marriage. It's speculated, however, that financial riches played a strong role in her not marrying. Over the years, Catherina developed a great deal of wealth, so much so, that she gave over 10,000 guilders, (a large sum of money), to her brother, David's wife, after he died.

== Collaborations ==
During the 17th century, it was quite common for poets to create works together, going back and forth in friendly, poetic responses of one topic or another. Between November 1662 and January 1663, Catherina, and her childhood friend, Cornelia van der Veer, wrote a series of poems together, that was published in 1665. It was called the Battle for the Laurels between Catherina Questiers and Cornelia van der Veer. It included ten poems in which the two attempted to battle to see who was more deserving of the poet's laurel wreath, which was a classical tribute to eminent poets. In the spirit of good-nature, the battle was deemed a tie. In total, Catherina contributed 31 poems, while Cornelia contributed 51. There were also other poems written by friends that they included in the book, bringing it to a lengthy 375 page, limited edition.

== Marriage ==
The Battle for Laurels was Catherina's final publication. Her career ended when she wed on April 19, 1664, in Amsterdam Leiden, to a merchant, named Johan Cough (1627-1673). Although they never had any children, the two remained married until her death in 1669, five years later.

== Death ==
Catarina died of natural causes on February 1, 1669. Enscripted on her grave, Vondel wrote, “The envy of the tombstone covers the beauty of Questier. / The spirit, more beautiful still, lives in wood and white paper. / In earth and heaven rose for her a large brawl. / All pulled. Heaven won the soul, the most beautiful part.

Original inscription: De nijt des zerks bedekt de schoonheit van Questier. / De geest, noch schooner, leeft in hout en wit papier. / In aerde en hemel rees om haer een groot krakkeel. / Elk trok. De hemel won de ziel, het schoonste deel.

(Nozeman).”

== Works by Catherine Questiers ==
- De geheymen minnaar (The secret lover) (1655)
- Casimier, of gedempte Hoogmoet (Casimir, or the muted arrogance)(1656)
- D'Ondanckbare Fulvius en Getrouwe Octavia (The ungrateful Fulvius and Faithful Octavia) (1665)
- Laurel-stryt (Laurel battle) (1665)

=== Poetry ===
- Wintry evenings, stories or Dutch (Amsterdam, 1649).
- Comical olipodrigo (Amsterdam 1655).
- Klioos stall 2 (London 1657).
- Amsterdam-pulp mixture 1 (1658).
- Flower Wreath of several poems (Amsterdam 1659).
- Joan Blasius, Fidamants kisses, and love-by-wysen Rymen to Celestyne (Amsterdam 1663).
- Clioos Cytter (Amsterdam, 1669 [1st printing 1663]).

=== Primary texts by Catherine Questiers ===
- Catherine Questiers, "On a drawing of Mars and Venus. In: The first part of the Amsterdam-Moez mixture (1658)
- Catherine Questiers, 'New-year, two of festoon cornucopia and shells on AH. IB-income. " In: The first part of the Amsterdam-Moez mixture (1658)
- Catherine Questiers, "None of both. In: The first part of the Amsterdam-Moez mixture (1658)
- Catherine Questiers, "Vryheydts-loff (Ode to freedom). In: The first part of the Amsterdam-Moez mixture (1658)
- Catherine Questiers, "The Drum Major laughing depiction of January." In: The first part of the Amsterdam-Moez mixture (1658)
- Catherine Questiers, "On the depictiond of FD Painter, HV-income Sculptor. In: The first part of the Amsterdam-Moez mixture (1658)
- Catherine Irish Quest, "On Fidamant, Kisses and Love on his singing." In: Fidamants kisses, and love-by-wysen Rymen to Celestyne (1663)
- C. Barlaeus, H. Beaumont, Francois Le Bleu, Cornelis Boey, Marcus Zuerius Boxhorn, Henrick Bruno, Jacob van der Burgh, Jacob Cats, Jeremias de Decker, George Rataller Doubleth, Daniel Heinsius, Nicholas Heinsius, PC Hooft, Daniel Mostart, H. Nierop, Catharina Questiers, Anna Maria van Schurman, Joost van den Vondel and Jacob Westerbaen, "Command, poems, etc. of the Corn Flowers (1658). In: Poems. Part 6: 1656-1661 (1896)
