= Yvonne Keuls =

Dutch writer (1931–2025)

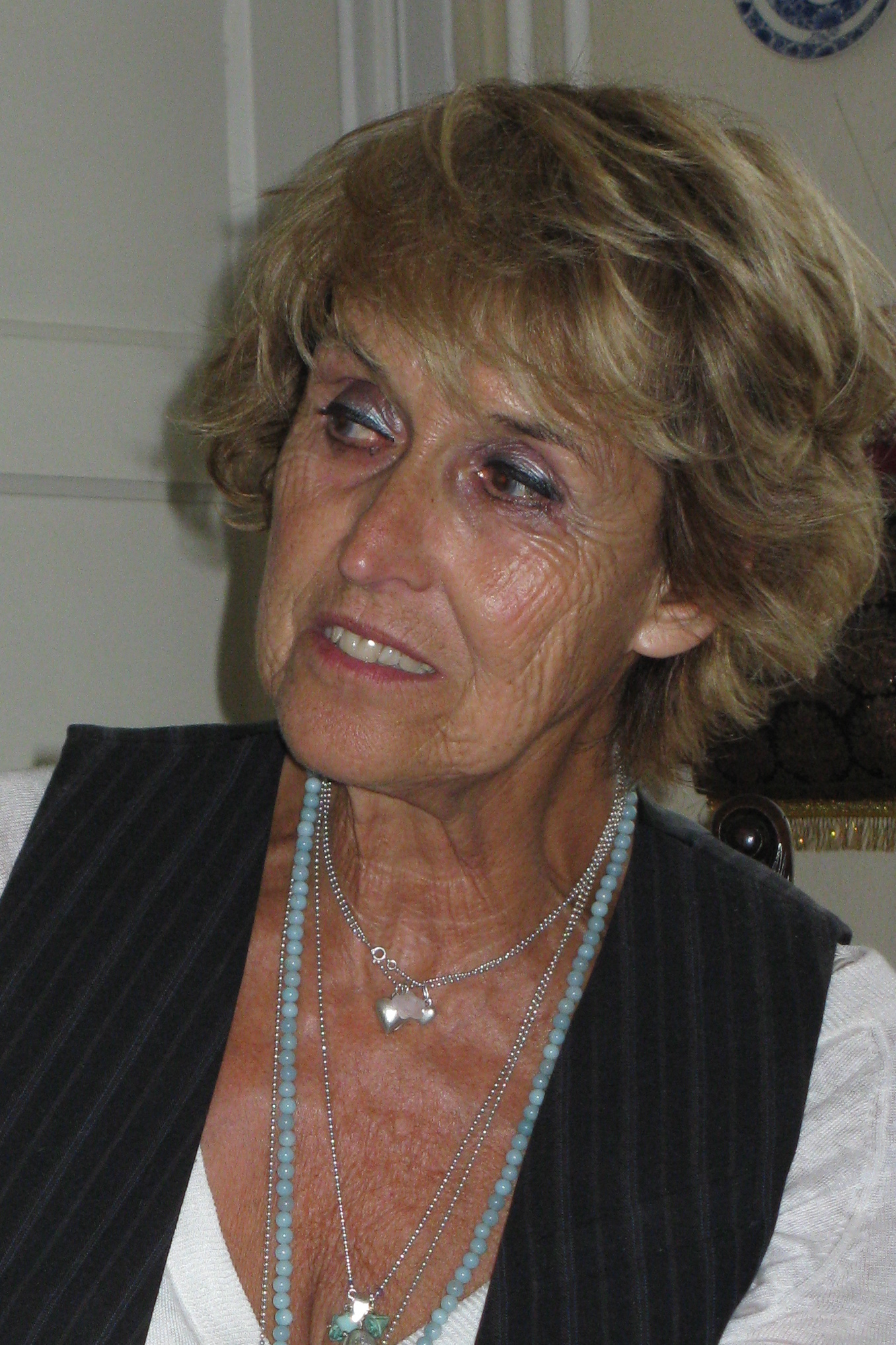
Keuls in 2010

Yvonne Keuls (17 December 1931 – 16 November 2025) was a Dutch Indo writer. She was born in Batavia (modern-day Jakarta) and wrote novels about social problems, as well as about herself and her family. Her writing style was realistic and sometimes humorous. Her work received several awards. In the early 1970s, Keuls became a permanent panellist in the NCRV quiz show, Like father, like son, and the variation, Like mother, like daughter, Like mother, like son, and Like father, like daughter. In the 1980s, she took part in the NCRV's panel program. Keuls was married with children. Her filmography included Jan Rap en Z'n Maat.

Keuls died in The Hague on 16 November 2025, at the age of 93.

== Publications ==
=== Translations into English ===
- Yvonne Keuls: The mother of David S.. Transl. by J.W. Arriens. London, Souvenir Press, 1985. ISBN 0-285-62695-7
  Same transl., other ed.: London, Corgi, 1986 (ISBN 0-552-12754-X) & New York, St. Martin's Press, 1986 (ISBN 0-312-54931-8)

=== Works ===
- Onbegonnen werk (1967)
- Jan Rap en z'n maat (1977)
- Keuls potje (1979)
- Een doekje voor het bloeden (1980)
- Keulsiefjes (1980)
- De moeder van David S., geboren 3 juli 1959 (1980)
- Kleine muizen (1981)
- Regenwormen (1981)
- Het verrotte leven van Floortje Bloem (1982)
- Annie Berber en het verdriet van een tedere crimineel (1985)
- De arrogantie van de macht (1986)
- Daniël Maandag (1988)
- De tocht van het kind (1990)
- Meneer en mevrouw zijn gek (1992)
- Lowietjes smartengeld of: Het gebit van mijn moeder (1995)
- Keulsiefjes (1996)
- Mevrouw mijn moeder (1999)
- Dochters (1999)
- Indische Tantes (2001)
- Madame K: Van Indisch kind tot Haagse dame (2001)
- Familiegedoe (2004)
- Benjamins bruid (2008)
- Allemaal beestjes (2009)
