= Mike Starink =

Dutch television presenter and stage actor

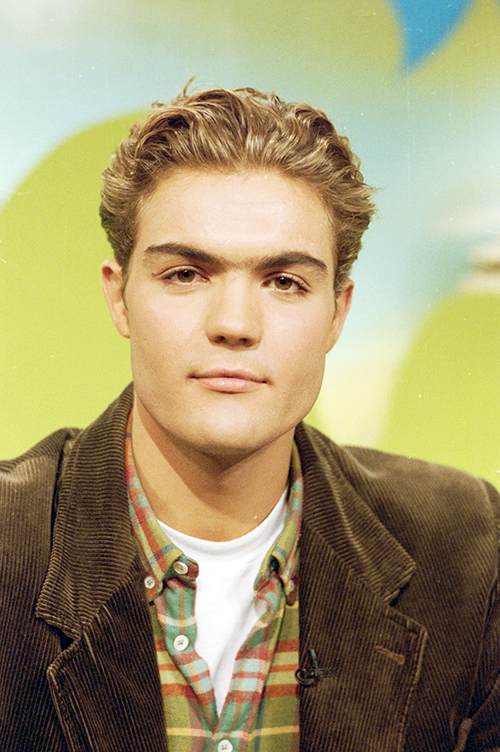
Mike Starink in 1991

Mike Starink (born 18 October 1970 in Arnhem) is a Dutch television presenter and stage actor.

In the early 1990s he worked as a presenter on the children's show 'Disney Club' on the Dutch NCRV network together with Jochem van Gelder. He also co-hosted the associated children's theater productions.

Starink also presented for other Dutch TV shows like The Lounge, Nachtsuite, Liefde op het eerste gezicht, Lijn 4, Dier Enzo and Factor 4. In addition to his work as a presenter, he made many guest appearances in Dutch TV series including Sam Sam, De Garage, Kats & Co and Onderweg naar morgen.

In 2000, Mike participated in the TV show Big Brother VIPS.

In 2006, he worked as a behind-the-scenes editor and reporter for the program Entertainment Live for the Talpa network and in 2007 for Christine Live on the Veronica network. Starting in October 2009 he starred in a play by Paul Haenen titled In bed is het fijn toeven which was translated into English and performed in 2010-2011 as Dwelling in bed ain't bad. As of 2011 Starink is preparing his second play, Wat een heerlijk hete dag ("What a wonderfully hot day"), also written by Haenen.
