= Jan Campert Prize =

Dutch literary award

The Jan Campert Prize (in Dutch: Jan Campert-prijs) is a Dutch literary prize established in 1948, which is awarded annually for works of poetry by the Jan Campert Foundation. The foundation was created in 1948 to honour Jan Campert, considered by many to be an icon of the Dutch resistance.

== Winners ==
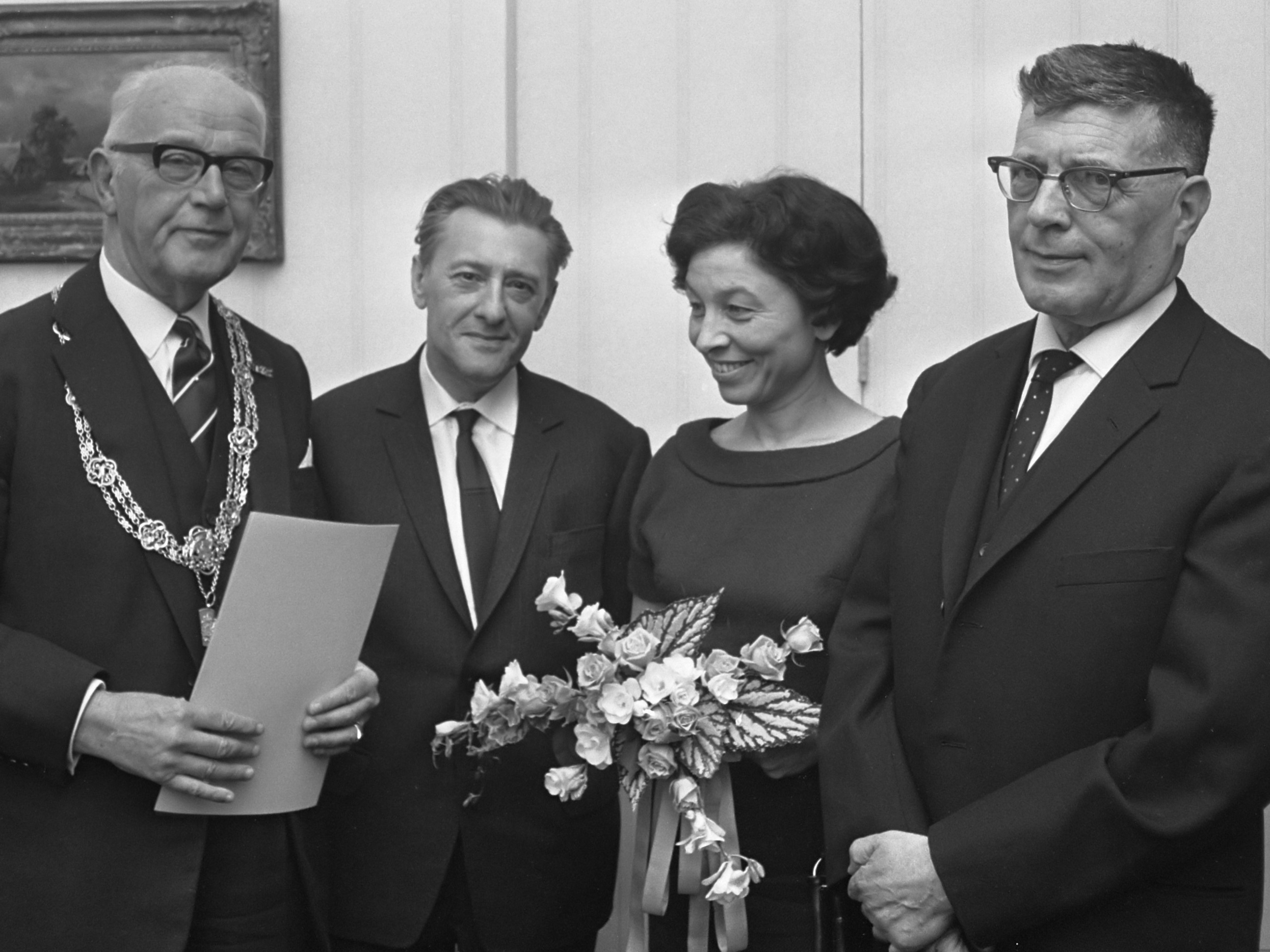
Jan Campert Prize 1966 to Hanny Michaelis and Jacques Presser

Winners include:

- 1948: Jan Elburg, Klein t(er)reurspel
- 1949: Michel van der Plas, Going my way
- 1950: Hans Lodeizen, Het innerlijke behang (postuum)
- 1951: Bert Voeten, Met het oog op morgen
- 1952: Maria Dermoût, Nog pas gisteren
- 1953: Albert Besnard, Doem en dorst
- 1954: Nes Tergast, Werelden (geweigerd)
- 1955: not awarded
- 1956: Remco Campert, Met man en muis en Het huis waar ik woonde
- 1957: not awarded
- 1958: not awarded
- 1959: Sybren Polet, Geboorte-stad
- 1960: not awarded
- 1961: Ellen Warmond, Warmte, een woonplaats
- 1962: Gerrit Kouwenaar, De stem op de 3e etage
- 1963: Ed. Hoornik, De vis/In den vreemde
- 1964: Louis Th. Lehmann, Who's Who in Whatland
- 1965: Willem Hussem, Schaduw van de hand
- 1966: Hanny Michaelis, Onvoorzien
- 1967: Jozef Eykmans, Zonder dansmeester
- 1968: Hans Vlek, Een warm hemd voor de winter
- 1969: Rutger Kopland, Alles op de fiets
- 1970: Hans Andreus, Natuurgedichten en andere

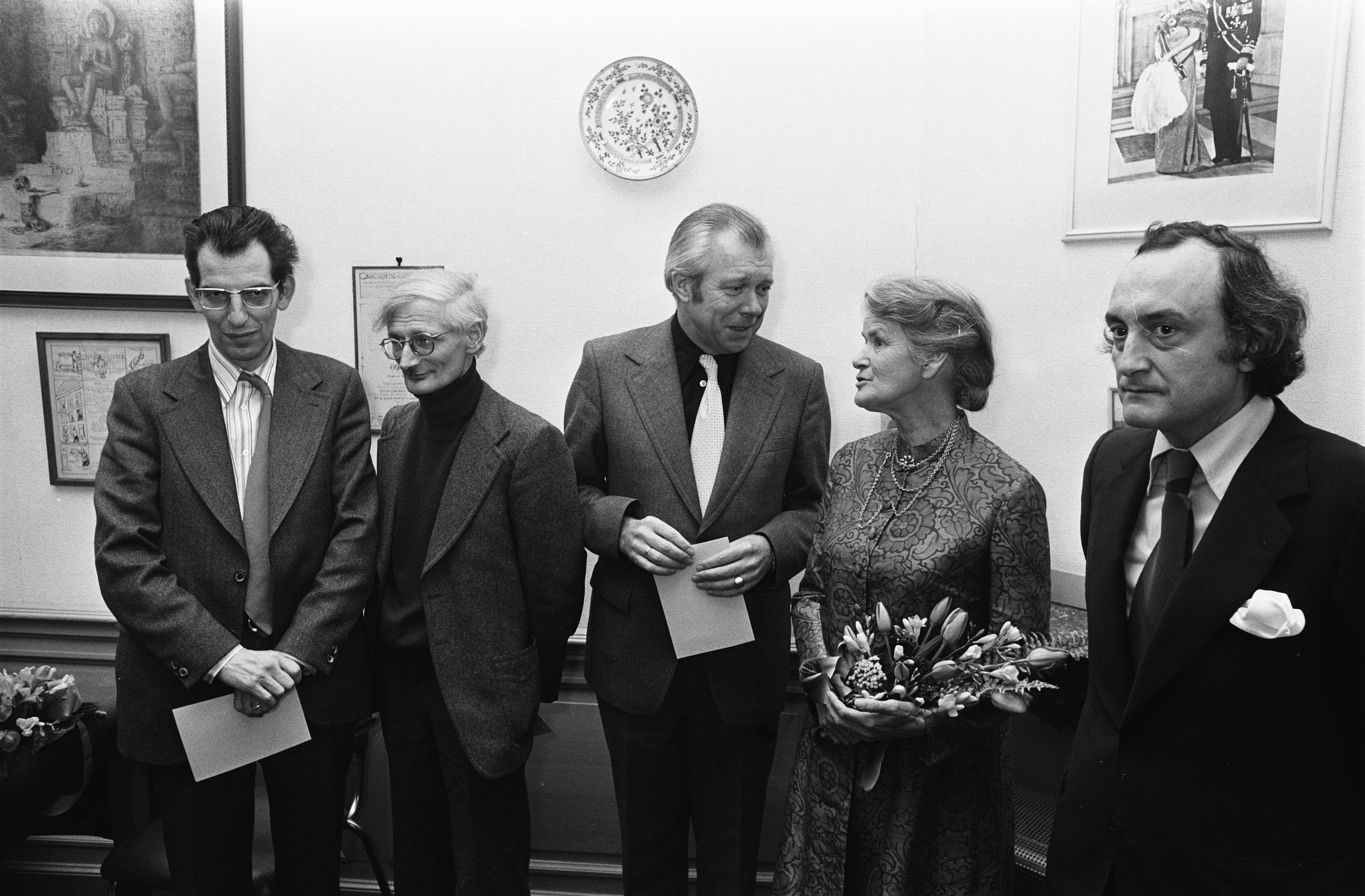
L-R: P.J. Piet Buijnsters, Dirkje Kuik), Piet Vink, M. Vasalis, Hugues C. Pernath (The Hague, 19 December 1974)

- 1971: Paul Snoek, Gedichten
- 1972: Albert Bontridder, Zelfverbranding
- 1973: Hans van den Waarsenburg, De vergrijzing
- 1974: Hugues C. Pernath, Mijn tegenstem
- 1975: Eddy van Vliet, Het grote verdriet
- 1976: Kees Buddingh', Het houdt op met zachtjes regenen
- 1977: Hans Faverey, Chrysanten, roeiers
- 1978: Cees Nooteboom, Open als een schelp: dicht als een steen
- 1979: Roland Jooris, Gedichten 1958-78
- 1980: Ed Leeflang, De hazen en andere gedichten
- 1981: Judith Herzberg, Botshol
- 1982: Willem van Toorn, Het landleven
- 1983: Robert Anker, Van het balkon
- 1984: Ad Zuiderent, Natuurlijk evenwicht
- 1985: Kees Ouwens, Klem
- 1986: Herman de Coninck, De hectaren van het geheugen
- 1987: Tom van Deel, Achter de waterval
- 1988: H.H. ter Balkt, Aardes deuren
- 1989: Miriam van Hee, Winterhard
- 1990: Jan Kuijper, Tomben
- 1991: Leonard Nolens, Liefdes verklaringen
- 1992: Willem Jan Otten, Paviljoenen
- 1993: Toon Tellegen, Een dansschool
- 1994: Lloyd Haft, Atlantis
- 1995: Eva Gerlach, Wat zoekraakt
- 1996: Huub Beurskens, Iets zo eenvoudigs
- 1997: Elma van Haren, Grondstewardess
- 1998: Tonnus Oosterhoff, Robuuste tongwerken, een stralend plenum
- 1999: Peter van Lier, Gegroet o...
- 2000: K. Michel, Waterstudies
- 2001: Arjen Duinker, De geschiedenis van een opsomming
- 2002: Menno Wigman, Zwart als kaviaar
- 2003: Jan Eijkelboom, Heden voelen mijn voeten zich goed
- 2004: Mustafa Stitou, Varkensroze ansichten
- 2005: Nachoem Wijnberg, Eerst dit dan dat
- 2006: Esther Jansma, Alles is nieuw
- 2007: Dirk van Bastelaere, De voorbode van iets groots
- 2008: Peter Verhelst, Nieuwe Sterrenbeelden
- 2009: Alfred Schaffer, Kooi
- 2010: Hélène Gelèns, zet af en zweef
- 2011: Erik Spinoy, Dode kamer
- 2012: Wouter Godijn, Hoe H.H. de wereld redde
- 2013: Micha Hamel, Bewegend doel
- 2014: Piet Gerbrandy, Vlinderslag
- 2015: Ilja Leonard Pfeijffer, Idyllen
- 2016: Jan Baeke, Seizoensroddel
- 2017: Marije Langelaar, Vonkt
- 2018: Annemarie Estor, Niemandslandnacht
- 2019: Paul Demets, De Klaverknoop
- 2020: Maud Vanhauwaert, Het stad in mij
- 2021: Mischa Andriessen, Het drogsyndicaat
- 2022: Dominique De Groen, Slangen
- 2023: Rozalie Hirs, Ecologica
- 2024: Simone Atangana Bekono, Marshmallow
- 2025: Benzokarim, Ons gaan allemaal
