= Henk van der Waal =

Dutch poet (born 1960)

- Born: 3 January 1960 (age 66); Hilversum, Netherlands
- Occupation: Poet
- Writing career
- Notable awards: C. Buddingh'-prijs 1996; Ida Gerhardt Poëzieprijs 2012

Henk van der Waal (born 1960) is a Dutch poet.

== Early life ==
Van der Waal studied philosophy at the University of Amsterdam.

== Career ==
Van der Waal has worked as a journalist, a translator and as a teacher at the Gerrit Rietveld Academie.

In 1996, he won the C. Buddingh'-prijs for his debut poetry collection De windsels van de sfinx (1995). His second poetry collection Schuldsanering (2000) was nominated for the Paul Snoek-poëzieprijs. He was also nominated for the VSB-Poëzieprijs in 2004 for his poetry collection De aantochtster (2003).

In 2012, he won the Ida Gerhardt Poëzieprijs for his poetry collection Zelf worden. The collection was also nominated for the VSB-Poëzieprijs.

Van der Waal and Erik Lindner wrote the book De kunst van het dichten, a collection of essays and conversations with other poets, including Nachoem Wijnberg, Anneke Brassinga and Anne Vegter. Van der Waal also published Liefdesgeschiedenissen in 1991, a Dutch translation of the work Histoires d'amour (1983) by Bulgarian-French philosopher Julia Kristeva. He has also translated works of Maurice Blanchot, Paul Auster and Hans Faverey.

== Awards ==
- 1996: C. Buddingh'-prijs, De windsels van de sfinx
- 2012: Ida Gerhardt Poëzieprijs, Zelf worden
