= VSB Poetry Prize =

Dutch language poetry prize

The VSB Poetry Prize (Dutch: VSB Poëzieprijs) is the most important Dutch language poetry prize.

It was awarded annually to a Dutch-language poet from 1994 until 2018. The prize winner was announced on the day before Poetry Day in the Netherlands, the last Thursday in January. It is funded by the VSB cultural fund, which was established by the Dutch bank Verenigde Spaarbank. The award was initiated through the efforts of Huub Oosterhuis.

The prize consisted of 25,000 Euros and a sculpture created by artist Maria Roosen.

== Prize winners ==
Year	Author	Work
2018	Joost Baars	Binnenplaats
2017	Hannah van Binsbergen	Kwaad gesternte
2016	Ilja Leonard Pfeijffer	Idyllen
2015	Hester Knibbe	Archaïsch de dieren
2014	Antoine de Kom	Ritmisch zonder string
2013	Ester Naomi Perquin	Celinspecties
2012	Jan Lauwereyns	Hemelsblauw
2011	Armando	Gedichten 2009
2009	Nachoem Wijnberg	Het leven van
2008	Leonard Nolens	Bres
2007	Tomas Lieske	Hoe je geliefde te herkennen
2006	Mark Boog	De encyclopedie van de grote woorden
2005	Arjen Duinker	De zon en de wereld
2004	Mustafa Stitou	Varkensroze ansichten
2003	Tonnus Oosterhoff	Wij zagen ons in een kleine groep mensen veranderen
2002	Anneke Brassinga	Verschiet
2001	Kees Ouwens	Mythologieën
2000	K. Michel	Waterstudies
1999	Esther Jansma	Hier is de tijd
1998	Rutger Kopland	Tot het ons los laat
1997	Gerrit Kouwenaar	De tijd staat open
1996	Leo Vroman	Psalmen en andere gedichten
1995	Huub Beurskens	Aangod en de afmens
1994	Hugo Claus	De Sporen
