= Sybren Polet =

Dutch writer and poet

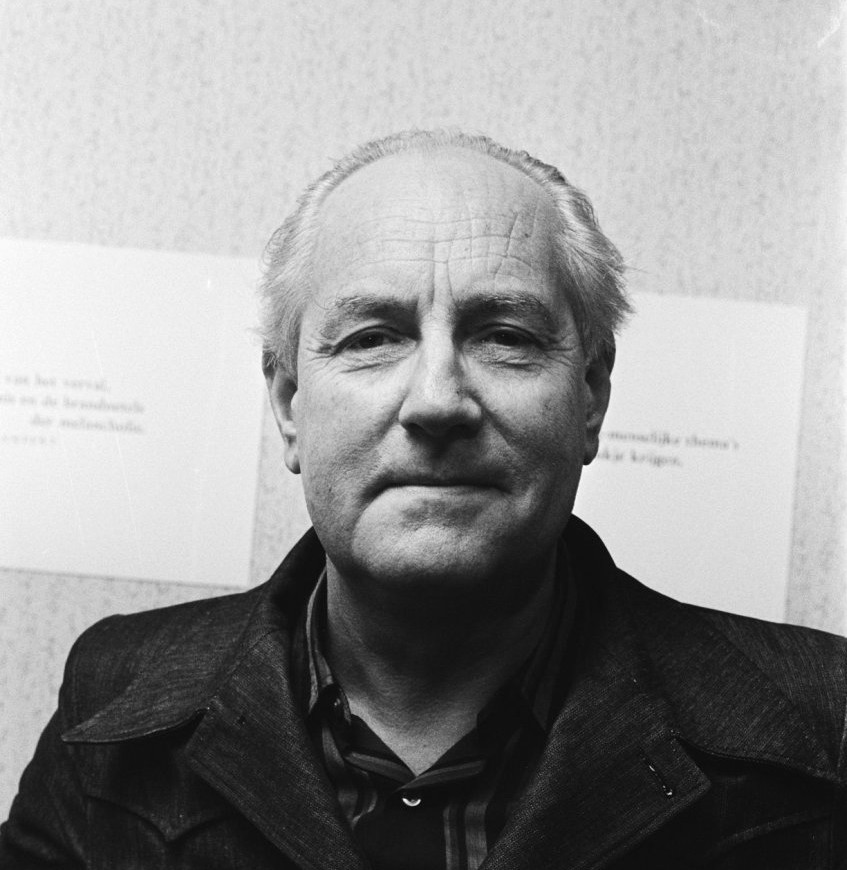
Sybren Polet in 1978

Sybe Minnema (June 19, 1924 – July 19, 2015), known by his pen name Sybren Polet, was a Dutch prose writer and poet. He won numerous awards, among them the 2003 Constantijn Huygens Prize.

Born in Kampen, he worked as a teacher in Zwolle. After World War II he made his debut under his own name with the poetry collection "Genesis" (1946). As Sybren Polet he made his debut in 1949 in the literary magazine Podium, which he served from 1952 to 1965 as an editor. In 1961 he published his first novel "Breekwater" (Breakwater).

His work is counted among that of the Vijftigers, a literary movement from the 1950s in the Netherlands and Belgium.

His prose (novels and stories) has a strong experimental / innovative character, where the boundaries between genres and conventions structure and chronology split apart: dream and reality co-exist, past, present and future blend together; characters have no fixed properties. In this way he tried to articulate the complexity of existence, showing that it is anything but static and straightforward. Polet also wrote plays and children's books and put together anthologies of poetry and science fiction (perhaps the first of their kind in Dutch). He died in Amsterdam at the age of 91 on 19 July 2015.

== Prizes ==
- 1959 – Jan Campert Prize for Geboorte-stad
- 1959 – Poëzieprijs van de gemeente Amsterdam for Vleselijke stad
- 1972 – Herman Gorterprijs for Persoon/onpersoon
- 1973 – Busken Huetprijs for Literatuur als werkelijkheid. Maar welke?
- 2003 – Constantijn Huygens Prize for his whole body of work
- 2005 – Dirk Martensprijs for Een geschreven leven

== Partial bibliography ==
- Genesis (1946, poetry book)
- Demiurgasmen (1953, poetry book)
- De Steen (1957, fairytale novel)
- Klein Kareltje wordt Keizer (1957, children's book)
- De Vuurballons (1957, science fiction compendium)
- De Stenen Bloedzuiger (1957, id.)
- Organon (1958, poetry book)
- Geboorte-Stad (1958, poetry book)
- Lady Godiva op scooter (1960, poetry book)
- Het Huis (1960, single actor play performed at the Avant-garde-festival in Brussels)
- Het warme Noorden (1960, compendium of modern Swedish poetry, in conjunction with Amy van Marken)
- 1900-1950 (1960, compendium of modern foreign poetry in Dutch translation. Reprinted in 1975 as 'Door mij spreken verboden stemmen')
- De demon der eetzucht (1960)
- Konkrete Poëzie (1961)
- Breekwater (1961, novel)
- Verkenning in het onbekende (1964)
- Verboden tijd (1964)
- De koning komt voorbij (1965, "drama in drie stadia")
- Mannekino (1968, novel)
- Kikker en nachtegaal (1969, compendium of foreign poetry about the Netherlands and Dutch from the 17th century to the present)
- De Sirkelbewoners (1970, novel)
- Persoon/Onpersoon (1971, collected poetry)
- De man die een hoofd groter was (1971, fairytales, with a foreword by Ans Wortel)
- De geboorte van een geest (1974)
- Illusie & illuminatie (1975, poetry book)
- Adam X, een oratorium-collage met recitatieven, aria's, koren en koralen (1973)
- Droom van de oplichter: werkelijkheid (1977)
- Namen zijn nieuws (1977)
- Gedichten (1978)
- Ander proza (1978, compendium of Dutch experimental poetry)
- Een heel klein mannetje en andere sprookjes (1978)
- Xpertise, of De experts en het rode lampje (1978, novel)
- Een harde noot om te kraken (1982, onder de naam Henk Noriet)
- De poppen van het Abbekerker wijf (1983)
- Taalfiguren 1 en 2 (1983)
- Crito, ik ben de literatuur nog een haan schuldig, notities (1986)
- In de arena (1987, short fiction)
- Søren Kierkegaard: Dagboeken (1991)
- De creatieve factor, kleine kritiek der creatieve (on)rede (1993, essays)
- Het gepijnigde haar (1994, short fiction)
- De andere stad, een labyrint (1994, novel)
- Taalfiguren 3 & 4 (1995)
- Stadgasten, anamorfosen (1997, novel)
- De hoge hoed der historie, een geschiedboek (1999, novel)
- Veldwerk (2001, short fiction)
- Gedichten 1998-1948 (2001, collected poetry)
- Luchtwegen Nergenswind (2003)
- Tussen de zwarte en de witte pagina: de voorgeschiedenis van het moderne proza (2003)
- De dag na de vorige dag, een oversprong (2004)
- Een geschreven leven 1 (2004, autobiography)
- Een geschreven leven 2 (2005, autobiography)
- Een geschreven leven 3 (2005, autobiography)
- Dader gezocht. Play in (2006)
- Avatar. Avader (2006, poetry book)
- Bedenktijd. Een mozaïek (2007)
- Binnenstebuitenwereld (2008, poetry book)
- Donorwoorden (2010, poetry book)
- De Gouden Tweehoek (2011)
- Virtualia. Teletonen (2012, poetry book)
- Het aaahh & ooohh van de verbonaut (2014, poetry book)
