= Lloyd Haft =

American-born Dutch poet, translator, and sinologist

Lloyd Haft (born November 9, 1946, in Sheboygan, Wisconsin, USA) is an American-born Dutch poet, translator, and sinologist. He has been living in the Netherlands since 1968. Haft was educated at Harvard College and Leiden University. His translations into Dutch include works by Wallace Stevens and Hart Crane. He has translated Herman Gorter, Gerrit Kouwenaar, H. H. ter Balkt, Anton Ent, Bian Zhilin, Zhou Mengdie, Yang Lingye, and Lo Fu into English.

== Awards ==
- Ida Gerhardt Poëzieprijs for De Psalmen (2004)
- Jan Campert Prize for Atlantis (1994)

== Bibliography ==
=== Books in English (selection) ===
- 2022 − Zhou Mengdie: 41 Poems
- 2021 − Herman Gorter: Selected Poems
- 2006 – Zhou Mengdie's Poetry of Consciousness
- 2005 - Formosa (bilingual Dutch-English)
- 2002 - Where does old light go? / Wohin geht altes Licht
- 2000 – The Chinese Sonnet. Meanings of a Form
- 1998 – Where is the body that will hold?
- 1997 − A Guide to Chinese Literature (with Wilt Idema)
- 1996 – Anthropos (bilingual Dutch-English)
- 1993 – Atlantis (bilingual Dutch-English)
- 1981 – Pien Chih-lin (revised 1983, second printing, 2011)

=== Books in Dutch (selection) ===
- 2024 - Kruipruimte
- 2023 - Beluisteringen
- 2023 - Intocht (herziene, vermeerderde uitgave)
- 2018 − Intocht
- 2017 − Lau-tze's vele wegen
- 2008 − Deze poelen, deze geest
- 2005 − Formosa (bilingual Dutch-English)
- 2003 − De Psalmen in de bewerking van Lloyd Haft (fourth printing 2011)
- 1996 − Anthropos (bilingual Dutch-English)
- 1993 − Atlantis (bilingual Dutch-English)
- 1985 − Slakkehuis
- 1982 − Ikonen bij daglicht
