= Awater Poëzieprijs =

Dutch literary award

- Awarded for: Poetry publication in Dutch language
- Country: Netherlands
- First award: 2008

The Awater Poëzieprijs (Dutch for Awater Poetry Prize) is a Dutch poetry award awarded by poetry magazine Awater. It was first awarded in 2008. The winner is chosen by professional poetry readers, such as critics and teachers, who are asked to submit their top three best new Dutch poetry collections of the past year. As such, the award is intended to reflect the industry's opinion.

The award ceremony is held at the end of the annual poetry week (Poëzieweek) organised by various organisations in the Netherlands and Flanders. The winner of the prize receives €500.

== Winners ==
- 2008 - Tonnus Oosterhoff, Ware grootte
- 2009 - Arjen Duinker, Buurtkinderen
- 2010 - K. Michel, Bij eb is je eiland groter
- 2011 - Anne Vegter, Eiland berg gletsjer
- 2012 - Menno Wigman, Mijn naam is Legioen
- 2013 - Mustafa Stitou, Tempel
- 2014 - Alfred Schaffer, Mens dier ding
- 2015 - Ilja Leonard Pfeijffer, Idyllen
- 2016 - Eva Gerlach, Ontsnappingen
- 2017 - Marije Langelaar, Vonkt
- 2018 - Radna Fabias, Habitus
- 2019 - Mischa Andriessen, Winterlaken
- 2020 - Peter Verhelst, Zon
- 2021 - Sasja Janssen, Virgula
- 2022 - Mustafa Stitou, Waar is het lam?
