= Ida Gerhardt Poëzieprijs =

Dutch literary award

- Awarded for: Poetry collection
- Country: Netherlands
- Presented by: BIJ de Bieb
- Reward: €1,500
- First award: 2000
- Website: https://zutphenliterair.nl/ida-gerhardt-poezieprijs/

The Ida Gerhardt Poëzieprijs (Dutch for Ida Gerhardt Poetry Prize) is a Dutch poetry award named after classicist and poet Ida Gerhardt. The award was created by the municipal council of the city of Zutphen and is now awarded by the Stichting Ida Gerhardt Prijs. The award was created in 1998 and first awarded in 2000.

== Winners ==
- 2000: Kees 't Hart, Kinderen die leren lezen
- 2002: Anneke Brassinga, Verschiet
- 2004: Lloyd Haft, Psalmen
- 2006: Astrid Lampe, Spuit je ralkleur
- 2008: Nachoem Wijnberg, Liedjes
- 2010: Alfred Schaffer, Kooi
- 2012: Henk van der Waal, Zelf worden
- 2014: Pieter Boskma, Mensenhand
- 2016: Peter Verhelst, Wij totale vlam
- 2018: Menno Wigman, Slordig met geluk (awarded posthumously)
- 2020: Marieke Lucas Rijneveld, Fantoommerrie
- 2022: Anne Vegter, Big data
- 2024: Piet Gerbrandy, Niets dan dit. Een lijflied voor de ziel
- 2026: Daniël Vis, Aan wie, deze offers
