= Jacques Presser =

Dutch historian, writer and poet (1899–1970)

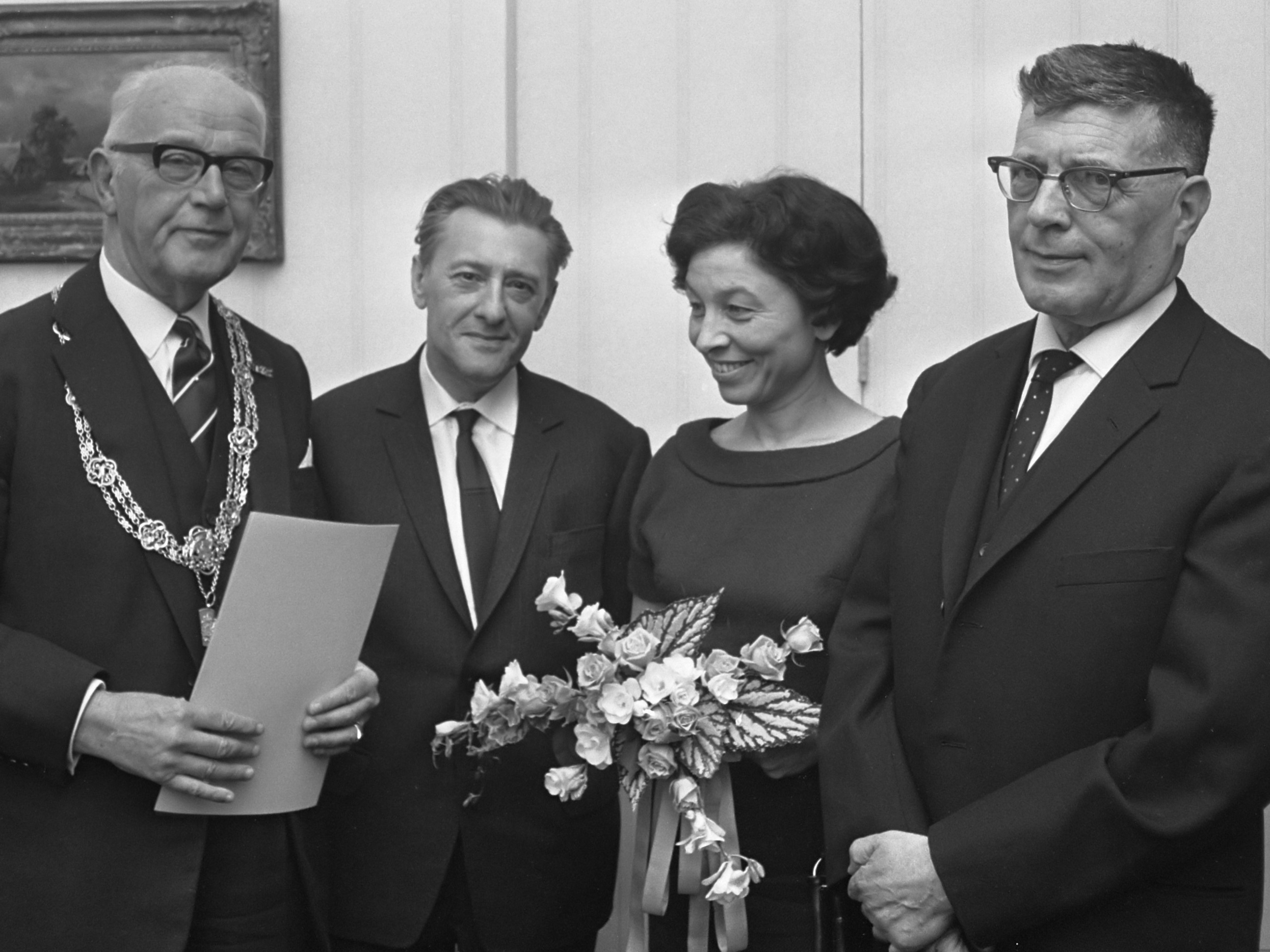
Hans Kolfschoten, Louis Paul Boon, Hanny Michaelis & Jacques Presser (1967)

Jacob (Jacques) Presser (24 February 1899 – 30 April 1970) was a Dutch historian, writer and poet who is known for his book Ashes in the Wind (The Destruction of the Dutch Jews) on the history of the persecution of the Jews in the Netherlands during World War II. Presser made a significant contribution to Dutch historical scholarship, as well as to European historical scholarship.

== Early life and education ==
Presser was born on 24 February 1899 in the former Jewish quarter of Amsterdam. His family was rather poor (his father was a diamond cutter), and his parents, who were secular Jews, had socialist leanings. Presser himself in later life also gravitated towards the left. As a child, he lived for a while with his family in Antwerp, Belgium.

He attended the University of Amsterdam after he finished a commercial vocational college and having worked in an office for two years. At the university, he studied history, art history, and Dutch. He graduated cum laude in 1926. Then, he taught history at the newly founded Vossius Gymnasium grammar school in Amsterdam.

In 1930, he came into contact with the renowned historian Jan Romein, who helped him to get a job as an instructor at the Instituut voor Historische Leergangen, which launched his academic career.

== Wartime ==
Presser was affected by the rising antisemitism in Nazi Germany and wrote critically about it. When Germany invaded the Netherlands in 1940, that was a very great shock for him, and he even attempted suicide. Because of the Nazi anti-Jewish policies, he lost his job at Vossius Gymnasium, but he managed to find work as a teacher at the Jewish Lyceum.

In early 1943, his wife, Deborah Appel, was arrested and deported to the Sobibor death camp, where she died. The loss of his first wife marked Presser for life, but he managed to escape from the Nazis by going into hiding in several places, including in the small town Lunteren.

== Postwar ==
After the war ended, Presser returned to his teaching job at the Vossius Gymnasium, and he was also a lecturer in political history, didactics, and the methodology of history at the Faculty of Arts of the University of Amsterdam.

In 1947, partly at his instigation, the politico-social faculty of law was established at the University, and he began to teach there. From 1948, he was also professor at the Faculty of Arts. His Marxist political leanings prevented him from receiving full promotions at the university until 1952. Over the years, he spoke out on political controversies, such as the Dutch Politionele acties against Indonesian decolonisation and the activities of U.S. Senator Joseph McCarthy against suspected communists. He also contributed to the communist daily paper De Waarheid shortly after the war. Later, he published in other leftist magazines, such as Vrij Nederland and De Groene Amsterdammer.

In 1954, Presser married Bertha Hartog, his second wife.

In 1959, he succeeded Jan Romein in his Dutch history chair at the Faculty of Arts at the University of Amsterdam. In 1966, he became a member of the Royal Netherlands Academy of Arts and Sciences.

Presser retired from his job on 31 May 1969. He died suddenly on 30 April 1970.

== Historical contributions and other works ==
One of Presser's most significant works was his extensive biography of Napoleon Bonaparte, first published in 1946. In contrast to the common hagiographies of the French emperor, Presser is quite critical of the personality and the political and military activity of Napoleon. Already in the introduction to the book, Presser makes quite clear that one of his main intentions is to try to dispel various euphemisms and legends about Napoleon. Presser depicts him as a ruthless autocrat and the axis of a group of marauders, his marshals. Napoleon comes to the fore as the organizer of the first modern dictatorship, which became an example for all later dictatorships. The book also contains extensive chapters on the pillars in French society which he used to strengthen his rule: Propaganda, Police & Justice, the Church, Education and (of course) the Army. Finally, Presser describes the legends about Napoleon in various countries. (The work is available only in Dutch and in German.)

Commissioned by Elsevier Publishers in 1941, Presser wrote a comprehensive history of the United States and completed the first version while in hiding. A reworked edition came out in 1949. Shortly after the Second World War, there was a lot of interest in US history in the Netherlands. The book is rich in its descriptions, anecdotes and details. The writer explicitly sympathizes with the 'underdogs' in American history: the native Americans, the unfree immigrants ('indentured servants'), the Afro-Americans and the poor. At the occasion of the 200th anniversary of the US Declaration of Independence in 1976, a fourth, revised and updated edition was published with a postscript on the period after 1965 by the expert Professor Rob Kroes. Since the book was mainly intended to serve the Dutch reading public, it was never translated.

In 1950, Presser received a commission from the Dutch government to produce a study about the fate of the Dutch Jews during the war. That would later become his historical masterpiece Ondergang [The destruction of the Dutch Jews]. He worked on this project for fifteen years and made full use of the vast archives of the Dutch Institute for War Documentation. The resulting work was a huge bestseller in the Netherlands when it was published in 1965. It still is the main reference work on the persecution of the Jews in the Netherlands under German occupation. A British edition came out in 1968 and an American edition in 1969, with reprints in 1988 and 2010. Presser graphically recounts stories of persecution: the registration, stigmatization, segregation, isolation, spoliation, roundups, the temporary exemptions, life in the transit camps, deportation and ultimately extermination but also stories of Jewish resistance, escape attempts and the process of going into hiding. The author pays attention to the role of the Dutch bureaucracy in the segregation and the isolation of the Jews and conveys the utter despair felt by people whose whole world had crumbled and would be destroyed. Of the Jewish population of some 140,000 in 1940, about 107,000 were deported from the Netherlands to the Nazi concentration and extermination camps from 1941 to 1944. Of those, fewer than 6,000 returned in 1945. An epilogue considers the aftermath on the "postwar Jewish attitude to life".

Presser made a very significant contribution to Dutch historical studies. His book on the Revolt of the Netherlands against Spain (1568–1648), first published in 1941 with a second print in 1942 that was soon prohibited by the German occupiers, was reprinted another four times after the Second World War. Until the late 1970ss it was the only modern, comprehensive historical study on the Dutch Revolt in its entirety. In 1953 Presser introduced the term 'egodocuments' as an umbrella term for texts in which he was especially interested: diaries, memoirs, autobiographies, interviews and personal letters. Along with other great historians, such as Groen van Prinsterer, Robert Fruin, Huizinga, Pieter Geyl, L.J. Rogier, Jan Romein, Annie Romein-Verschoor and Arie Th. van Deursen, he can be counted as one of the greatest historians of the Netherlands in the 19th and the 20th centuries.

Besides historical work, Presser also wrote works of literature. His book The Night of the Girondists, based on his war time experiences, received literary prizes and became an international best-seller. Set in the Dutch transit camp of Westerbork, the leading character of this book is an assimilated Jewish teacher collaborating with the Nazis. His job was to select Jews for transportation to Auschwitz, but he later realises that as a Jew, he was also bound to share the fate of those he had sent away.

Presser also wrote poetry and even ventured into the area of crime fiction.

== Bibliography ==
=== Historical works ===
- Das Buch "De Tribus Impostoribus" (Von den drei Betrügern). Amsterdam: H.J. Paris Publisher, 1926; 169 p. (doctoral dissertation, with the highest distinction, written and published in German).
- De Tachtigjarige Oorlog [The Eighty Years' War]. Amsterdam: Elsevier Publishers, 1941; 304 p. (under ps.), 1948 (3rd ed., under his own name; 6th ed. 1978; 378 p.).
- Napoleon: Historie en legende [Napoleon: History and Legend]. Amsterdam: Elsevier Publishers, 1946; 596 p. (7th ed. 1978; 632 p.).
- German translations (by Christian Zinsser):
  - Napoleon: das Leben und die Legende. Stuttgart: Deutsche Verlags-Anstalt, 1977. Zürich: Manesse Verlag, 1990, 1997; 1024 p. ISBN 3-7175-8156-2.
  - Napoleon: die Entschlüsselung einer Legende. Reinbek bei Hamburg: Rowohlt, 1979.
- Amerika: Van kolonie tot wereldmacht [America: From Colony to World Power]. Amsterdam: Elsevier Publishers, 1949 (4th revised ed. 1976; 592 p., with a chapter on the period 1965–1975 by Dr. Rob Kroes).
- Historia hodierna [Contemporary history]. Inaugural lecture. University of Amsterdam, 2 October 1950. Leiden: E. J. Brill Publishers, 1950; 35 p. Reprinted in: Uit het werk van dr. J. Presser [collection of 32 essays by Dr. J. Presser, written between 1929 and 1969], Amsterdam: Athenaeum, Polak & Van Gennep Publishers, 1969, pp. 209–225.
- Ondergang. De vervolging en verdelging van het Nederlandse Jodendom 1940–1945 [Extinction. The Persecution and Destruction of Dutch Jewry, 1940–1945]. Monograph Number 10 by the Netherlands' State Institute for War Documentation. The Hague: Staatsuitgeverij (Government Printer) & Martinus Nijhoff, 1965; vol. 1, XIV + 526 p.; vol. 2, VIII + 568 p. (8th ed. 1985). (Dutch PDF download of book)
- Abridged English translations (by Arnold Pomerans):
  - Ashes in the wind. The destruction of Dutch Jewry. London: Souvenir Press. 1968.; 556 p.
  - The destruction of the Dutch Jews. New York: E.P. Dutton, 1969; 556 p.
  - Ashes in the wind. The destruction of Dutch Jewry. Detroit: Wayne State University Press. 1988. ISBN 9780814320365. OCLC 17551064.
  - Ashes in the wind. The destruction of Dutch Jewry. Dr. Dienke Hondius (afterword). London: Souvenir Press. 2010. ISBN 9780285638136. OCLC 699863844.
- "Material Witness: The Netherlands State Institute for War Documentation", in: Delta, vol. 9, nr. 4, Winter 1966-1967, pp. 47–53
- "Introduction to the English Language Edition", in: Philip Mechanicus, Waiting for Death, a Diary. English translation by Irene R. Gibbons. London: Calder and Boyars, 1968, pp. 5–12
- "Introduction", in: L.Ph. Polak and Liesbeth van Weezel (eds.), Documents of the persecution of the Dutch Jewry 1940–1945. Amsterdam: Athenaeum – Polak & Van Gennep/Jewish Historical Museum, 1969 (2nd ed. 1979), pp. 7–12
- "The Judenrat in the Netherlands". Imposed Jewish Governing Bodies under Nazi Rule. YIVO Colloquium, December 2–5, 1967. Rachel Erlich (preface). New York: YIVO Institute for Jewish Research. 1972. pp. 54–64 and discussion on 64–70. OCLC 571685.

=== Literary works ===
- De Nacht der Girondijnen [The Night of the Girondins] (1957; 77 p., many reprints, translated into many languages)
- English translations:
  - Breaking Point. Cleveland/New York: The World Publishing Company, 1958; reprint as pocket by Popular Library, 1959.
  - The Night of the Girondists. Foreword by Primo Levi. London: Harper Collins, 1992.
- Orpheus en Ahasverus [Orpheus and Ahasveros. Poems]. Amsterdam: Athenaeum-Polak & Van Gennep, 4th, augmented ed., 1969; 80 p..
- Homo submersus [Man in Hiding] (A novel in the form of a diary by a Jew in hiding). Amsterdam: Boom Publishers, 2010; 528 p. (originally written in 1943-1944).

=== Documentary ===
- Dingen die niet voorbijgaan [Things that never pass] (Philo Bregstein 1970, VARA television; text of the movie edited [in Dutch] in Gesprekken met Jacques Presser [Conversations with Jacques Presser], Philo Bregstein Amsterdam 1972, and Meulenhoff Filmtekst, Amsterdam 1981).
- The past that lives. English-language version of Dingen die niet voorbij gaan.

== Awards ==
- 1947: Dr. Wijnaendts Francken Prize, for Napoleon. Historie en legende (Napoleon. History and Legend)
- 1957: Lucy B. and C.W. van der Hoogt Prize, for The Night of the Girondists
- Knighthood, and membership of the Royal Netherlands Academy of Arts and Sciences (KNAW)
- 1969: Remembrance Award from the World Federation of Bergen-Belsen Associations
