= Astrid Lampe =

Dutch poet, actor and director (born 1955)

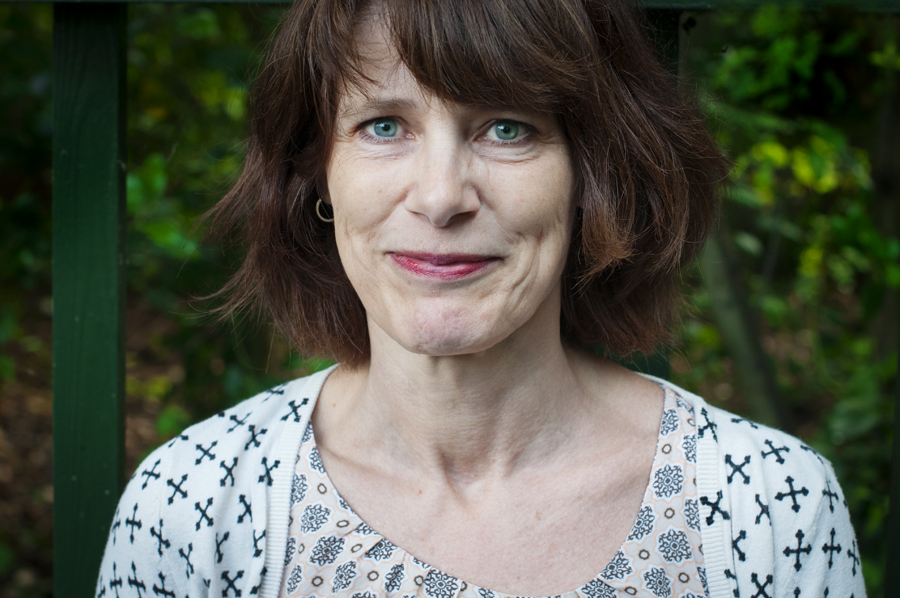
Lampe (2015)

Astrid Lampe (born December 22, 1955, in Tilburg, Netherlands) is a Dutch poet, actor and director. In addition, she teaches students of the Department of Language and Image at Rietveld Academy in Amsterdam.

== Works ==
- Lil(zucht) (Lil(sigh)), 2010
- Park Slope (K’nex studies), 2008
- Mosselman Hallo (Musselman Hello), 2006
- Middelburg, 2006
- Spuit je ralkleur (Squirt your RALcolour), 2005
- De memen van Lara (The Memes of Lara), 2002
- De sok weer aan (The Sock On Again), 2000
- Rib, 1997

== Awards ==
- 2007 - Writer Prize of Brabant Arts
- 2006 - Ida Gerhardt Poëzieprijs
- 2023 - P. C. Hooft Award
