= Tonnus Oosterhoff =

Dutch poet and writer

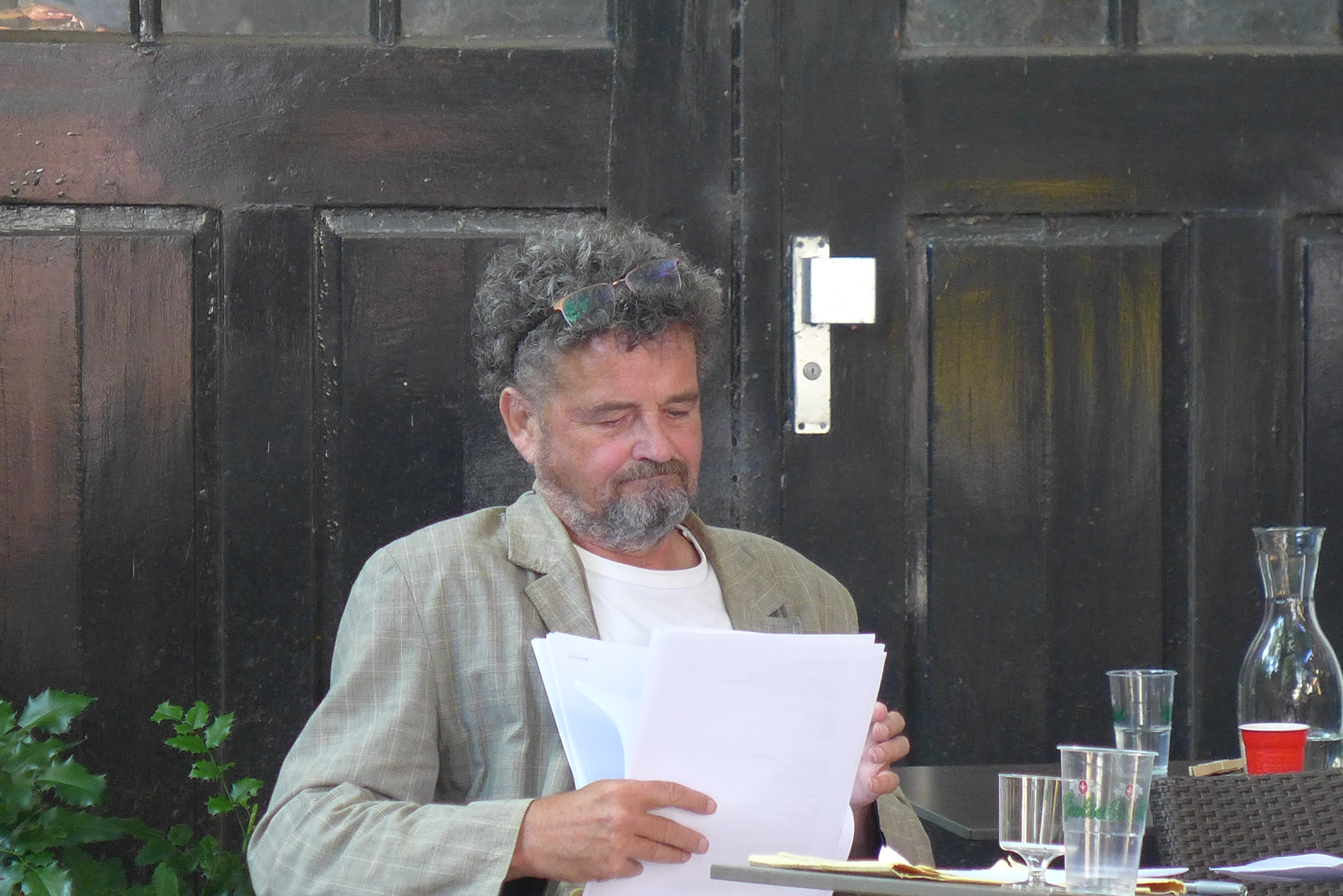
Tonnus Oosterhoff at the poetry festival Het Tuinfeest in Deventer, August 6, 2016

Tonnus Oosterhoff (Leiden, 18 March 1953) is a Dutch poet and writer.

== Biography ==
Born in Leiden, Tonnus Oosterhoff spent most of life in the Dutch province of Groningen. He studied Dutch literature and linguistics at the University of Groningen. Before publishing literary work, he wrote several anonymous stories for the magazine Mijn Geheim. One of them was republished in his later collection of short stories Dans zonder vloer ("Dance without floor", 2003) with an alternate "less unrealistic" happy end.

He made his debut in the literary magazine Raster. Oosterhoff published collections of poems, short stories, essays, a novel, a play and a radio drama. His oeuvre distinguishes itself by the use of subdued humour and the desire the reinvent itself with every new book. In 2001 he launched a website with moving poems. In 2005 he was a guest writer at his old university in Groningen.

In 2008 Oosterhoff received the Awater Poëzieprijs for his work Ware grootte.

In 2012 Oosterhoff received the P. C. Hooft Award for his, according to the jury, "highly renewing poetry".

== Bibliography ==
Oosterhoff's books are published by De Bezige Bij in Amsterdam.

- Boerentijger (1990) – poems
- Vogelzaken (1991) – short stories
- Denkbeeldige genietingen (1992) – radio drama KRO
- De ingeland (1993) – poems
- Het dikke hart (1994) – novel
- De vergroeiing (1995) – radio drama RVU
- Kan niet vernietigd worden (1996) – short stories
- (Robuuste tongwerken,) een stralend plenum (1997) – poems
- Wient maakt een kistje (1999) – play
- Ook de schapen dachten na (2000) – essays
- Wij zagen ons in een kleine groep mensen veranderen (2002) – poems
- Dans zonder vloer (2003) – short stories
- Hersenmutor. Gedichten 1990–2005 (2005) – collected poems
- Ware grootte (2008) – poems
- Handschreeuwkoor (2008) – poems in handwriting
- Leegte lacht (2011) – poems

== Awards ==
- 1990: C. Buddingh'-prijs for Boerentijger
- 1994: Herman Gorter-prijs for De ingeland
- 1995: Multatuliprijs for Het dikke hart
- 1998: Jan Campertprijs for (Robuuste tongwerken,) een stralend plenum
- 2003: VSB Poëzieprijs for Wij zagen ons in een kleine groep mensen veranderen
- 2010: Guido Gezelleprijs van de stad Brugge for Ware grootte
- 2012: P. C. Hooft Award for his whole poetic oeuvre
