= Herman Leenders =

Flemish writer and poet

- Born: 10 May 1960 (age 65) Bruges
- Occupation: Writer, poet

Herman Leenders (born 10 May 1960) is a Flemish writer and poet.

== Early life ==
Leenders was born in 1960 in Bruges. He studied German studies at the Catholic University of Leuven.

== Career ==
Leenders made his debut with poetry collection Mijn landschap, een beeldinventaris in 1982 as part of the Yang Poëzie Reeks. A decade later he published his second poetry collection Ogentroost (1992) for which he received three awards: the C. Buddingh'-prijs in 1993, the Hugues C. Pernath-prijs in 1993 and the Prijs van de Provincie West-Vlaanderen in 1995. In the years that followed he published various other poetry collections: Landlopen (1995), Speelgoed (2000), Vervalsingen (2008) and Dat is wij (2013).

Leenders also won the Prijs van de Provincie West-Vlaanderen for his collection of stories Het mennegat (1994).

He made his debut as novelist with the novel De echtbreukeling (2005). His next novel God speelt drieband was published in 2017.

Leenders' work is published by Dutch publishing company De Arbeiderspers.

== Awards ==
- 1990: Prijs van de stad Harelbeke
- 1993: C. Buddingh'-prijs (Ogentroost)
- 1993: Hugues C. Pernath-prijs (Ogentroost)
- 1995: Prijs van de Provincie West-Vlaanderen (Ogentroost)
- 1997: Prijs van de Provincie West-Vlaanderen (Het mennegat)
