= Hugues C. Pernath-prijs =

Belgian literary award

- Awarded for: Dutch-language poet no older than 43 years of age
- Country: Belgium
- First award: 1976

The Hugues C. Pernath-prijs (Note: Sometimes referred to as Pernathprijs.) (Dutch for Hugues C. Pernath Prize) is a Belgian literary award named after Flemish poet Hugues C. Pernath. The award is given every other year by the Hugues C. Pernathfonds to a Dutch-language poet no older than 43 years of age. The reason for this restriction is because Hugues C. Pernath, pseudonym of Hugo Wouters, died at age 43.

== Winners ==
- 1976: Annie Reniers, Nieuwe geboorte
- 1980: Leonard Nolens, Alle tijd van de wereld
- 1985: Leopold M. Van den Brande, De nabijheid van spiegels
- 1988: Dirk van Bastelaere, Pornschlegel en andere gedichten
- 1991: Erik Spinoy, Susette
- 1993: Herman Leenders, Ogentroost
- 1995: Luuk Gruwez, Vuile manieren
- 1997: Miguel Declercq, Person@ges
- 2001: Esther Jansma, Dakruiters
- 2003: Jan Lauwereyns, Buigzaamheden
- 2005: Ramsey Nasr, Onhandig bloesemend
- 2007: Alfred Schaffer, Schuim
- 2009: Arnoud van Adrichem, Vis
- 2011: Marije Langelaar, De schuur in
- 2013: Ingmar Heytze, Ademhalen onder de maan
- 2015: Maud Vanhauwaert, Wij zijn evenwijdig
