= Eva Gerlach =

Dutch poet (born 1948)

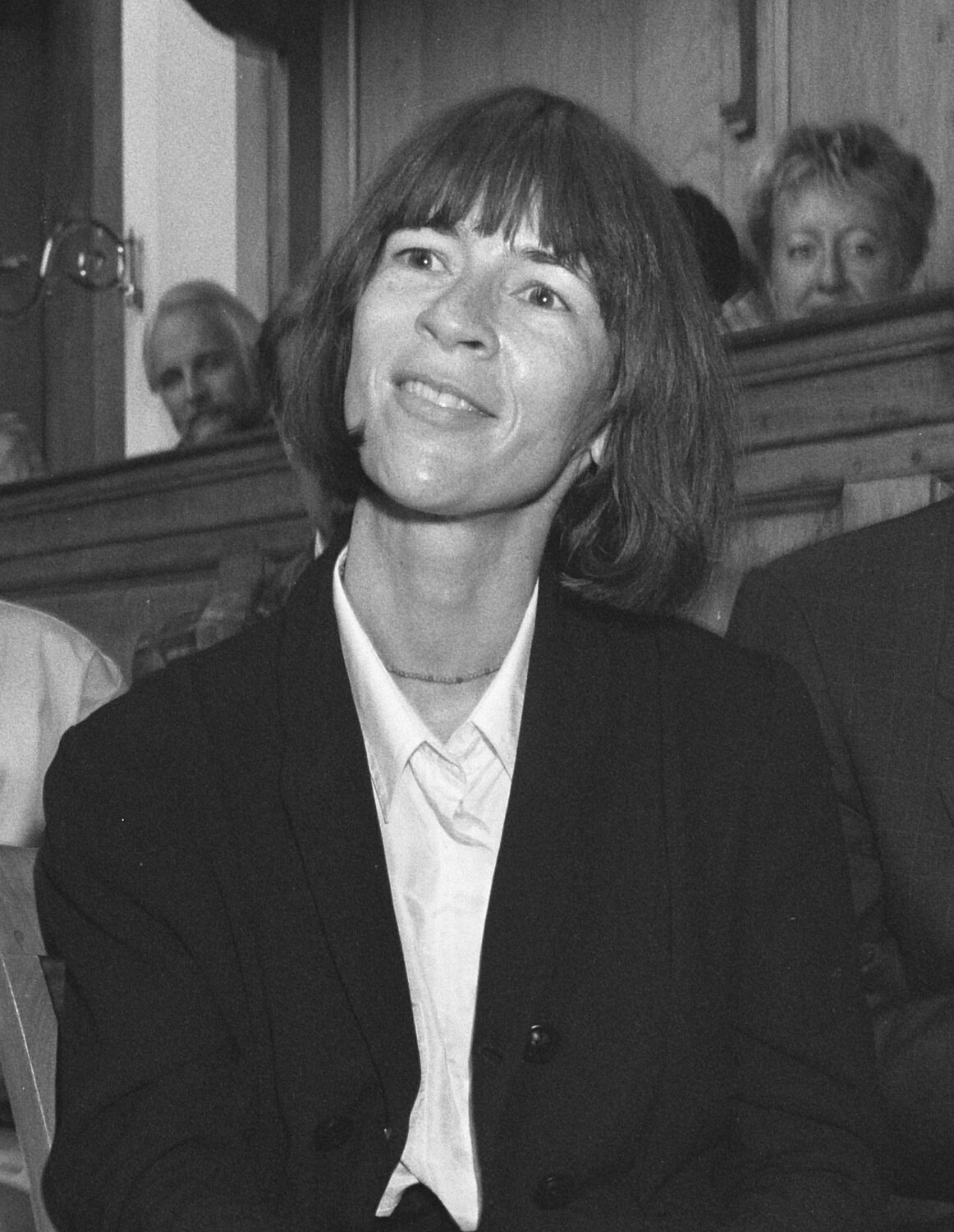
Eva Gerlach in 1988

Eva Gerlach (born 9 April 1948) is a Dutch poet. She also writes under the name Margaret Dijkstra.

== Biography ==
She was born on 9 April 1948 in Amsterdam. In 1979, she published her first collection of poetry Verder geen leed (No Further Distress) in 1979. It was awarded the Lucy B. and C.W. van der Hoogt Prize in 1981. In 2000, she received the P. C. Hooft Award for her work. In 1999 she won the Nienke van Hichtum-prijs for Hee meneer Eland.

Her work has appeared in various literary magazines and English translations of her poetry were included in the anthologies Women Writing in Dutch (1994) and Turning Tides (1994).

In 2016 she won the Awater Poëzieprijs for her work Ontsnappingen.

== Selected works ==
- Dochter (Daughter), poetry (1984)
- Domicilie (Domicile), poetry (1987)
- De kracht van verlamming (The power of paralysis), poetry (1988)
- Wat zoekraakt (What is lost), poetry (1994), received the Jan Campert Prize
- Hee meneer Eland, children's poetry (1998, received Nienke van Hichtum-prijs)
- Oog in oog in oog in oog (Eye to Eye to Eye to Eye), children's poetry (2001)
- Situaties (Situations) (2006)
