= Esther Jansma =

Dutch writer and poet (1958–2025)

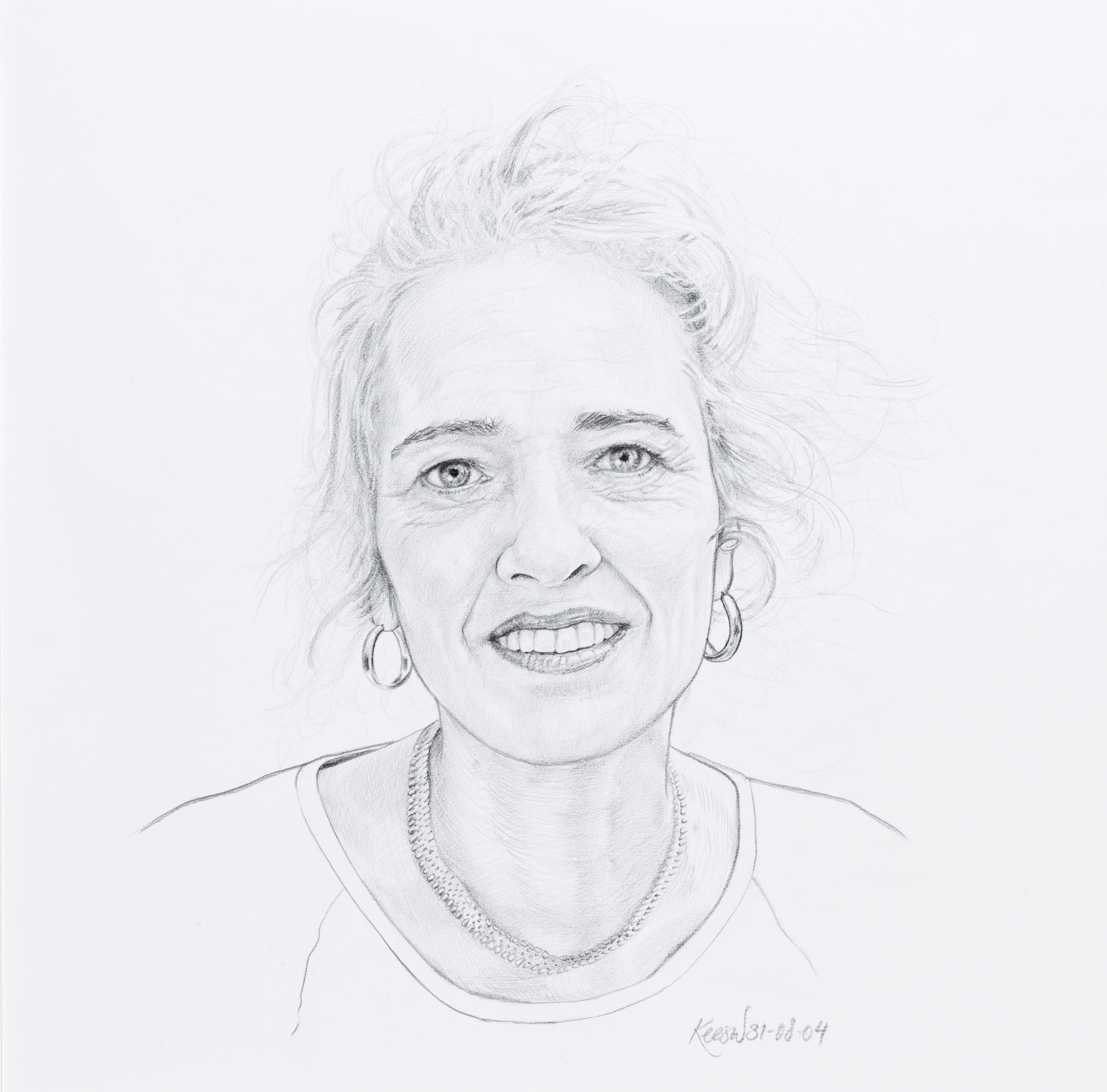
- Jansma by Kees Wennekendonk, 2004
- Born: 24 December 1958; Amsterdam, North Holland, The Netherlands
- Died: 23 January 2025 (aged 66); Utrecht, Utrecht province, The Netherlands
- Children: 4
- Parent(s): Adam Jansma and Nel van Lith

Esther Jansma (24 December 1958 – 23 January 2025) was a Dutch writer, poet and academic.

Jansma was born in Amsterdam on 24 December 1958, the daughter of two sculptors: Adam Jansma and Nel van Lith. Her father died in an accident when Jansma was six years old. She started writing poetry at an early age: she wrote her first poem at the age of 12. She later worked as an archaeologist. She was the scientific director of the Netherlands Centre for Dendrochronology Foundation. Dendrochronologists investigate the age and origin of wood, and often try to discover something about the lives of people centuries ago. She was a special professor of dendrochronology and paleoecology at Utrecht University. Jansma published her first collection of poetry Stem onder mijn bed (Voice under my Bed) in 1988. In 1990, she published Bloem, steen (Flower, Stone), which reflected her feelings after her first child died at birth. She was a professor in the Geosciences department at Utrecht University.

In 2024, she was knighted for her work as a dendrochronologist, appointed a Knight in the Order of the Netherlands Lion (the Dutch equivalent of a British damehood), partly for her research into the Dutch part of the Roman Limes, the border defences of the Roman Empire. She won several awards for her poetry, and read her work at many international festivals.

Jansma died from cancer in Utrecht on 23 January 2025, at the age of 66.

== Selected works ==
- Waaigat (Blow Hole), poetry (1993)
- Picknick op de wenteltrap (Picnic on the Winding Stairs), novel (1997)
- Hier is de tijd (Time is Here), poetry (1998), received the VSB Poetry Prize
- Dakruiters (Spires), poetry (2000), received the Hugues C. Pernath-prijs
- Alles is nieuw (Everything is New), poetry (2005), nominated for the VSB Poetry Prize and received the A. Roland Holst-Penning and the Jan Campert Prize
