= Simone Atangana Bekono =

Dutch writer

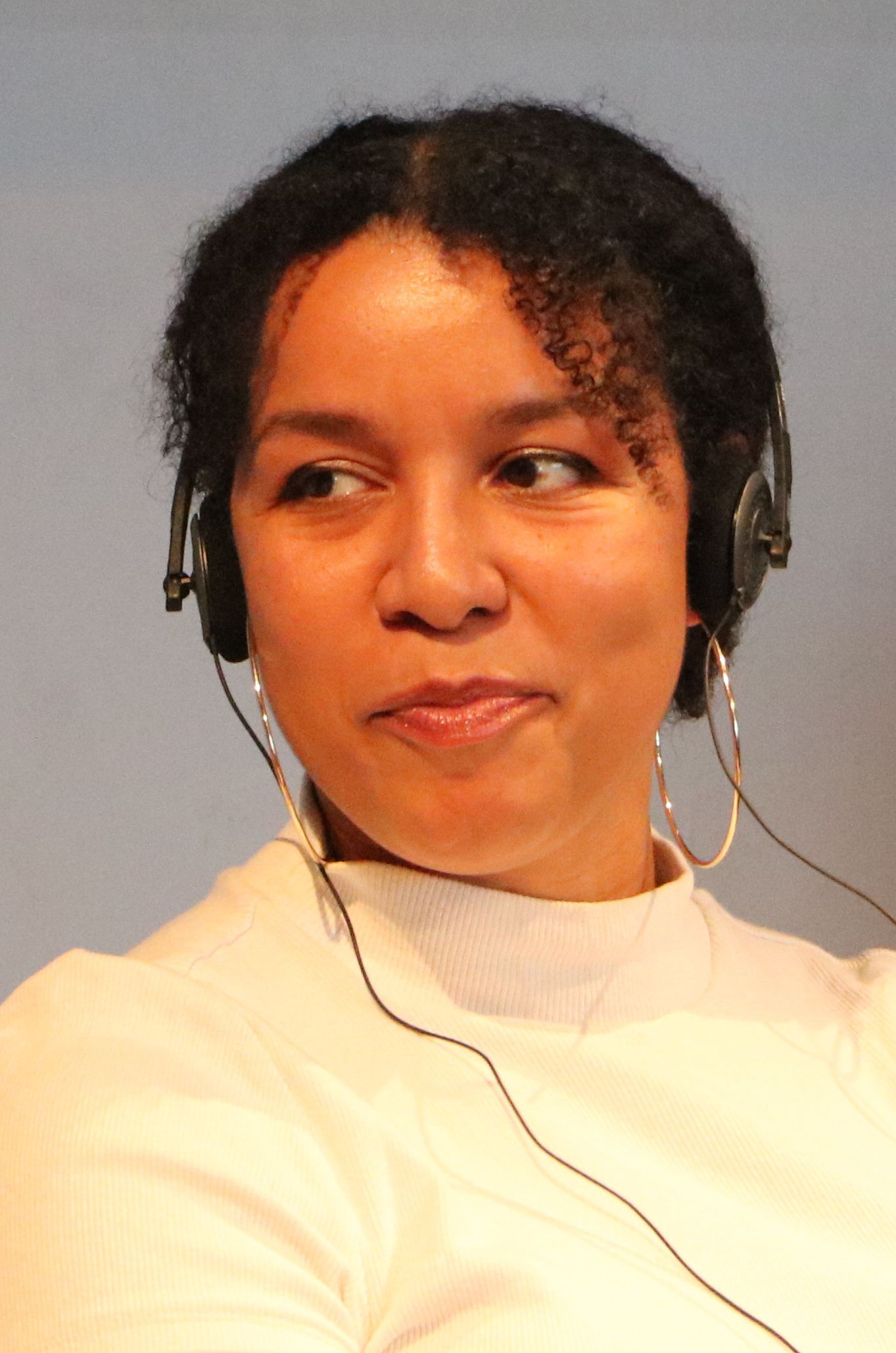
Simone Atangana Bekono in Nantes in 2025

Simone Atangana Bekono (born 1991) is a Dutch author. Her debut novel Confrontations was published in 2020.

== Biography ==
Atangana Bekono studied creative writing at ArtEZ Institute of the Arts in Arnhem. In 2017, she published a poetry collection Hoe de eerste vonken waren zichtbaar (How the First Sparks Became Visible) for which in 2018 she received the Poetry Debut Award Aan Zee.

In 2020 she published her first novel, Confrontaties ("Confrontations"). The book was an instant success, and won the Hebban Debuutprijs (an award for debut novels) and the Anton Wachter Award. It was nominated for the Libris Award. In 2024 the novel was translated in English and German, and by 2025 the book was in its sixteenth printing. That same year a stage version was produced by Theater Utrecht and DOX.

She writes columns for the national newspaper, NRC, and for the Zomer Magazine of another national newspaper, de Volkskrant.

On 1 November 2022, Atangana Bekono was appointed honorary fellow at the Faculty of Humanities of the University of Amsterdam.

Atangana Bekono received the 2024 Jan Campert Prize for her poem collection Marshmellow
