= Antoine de Kom =

Dutch psychiatrist, writer and poet (born 1956)

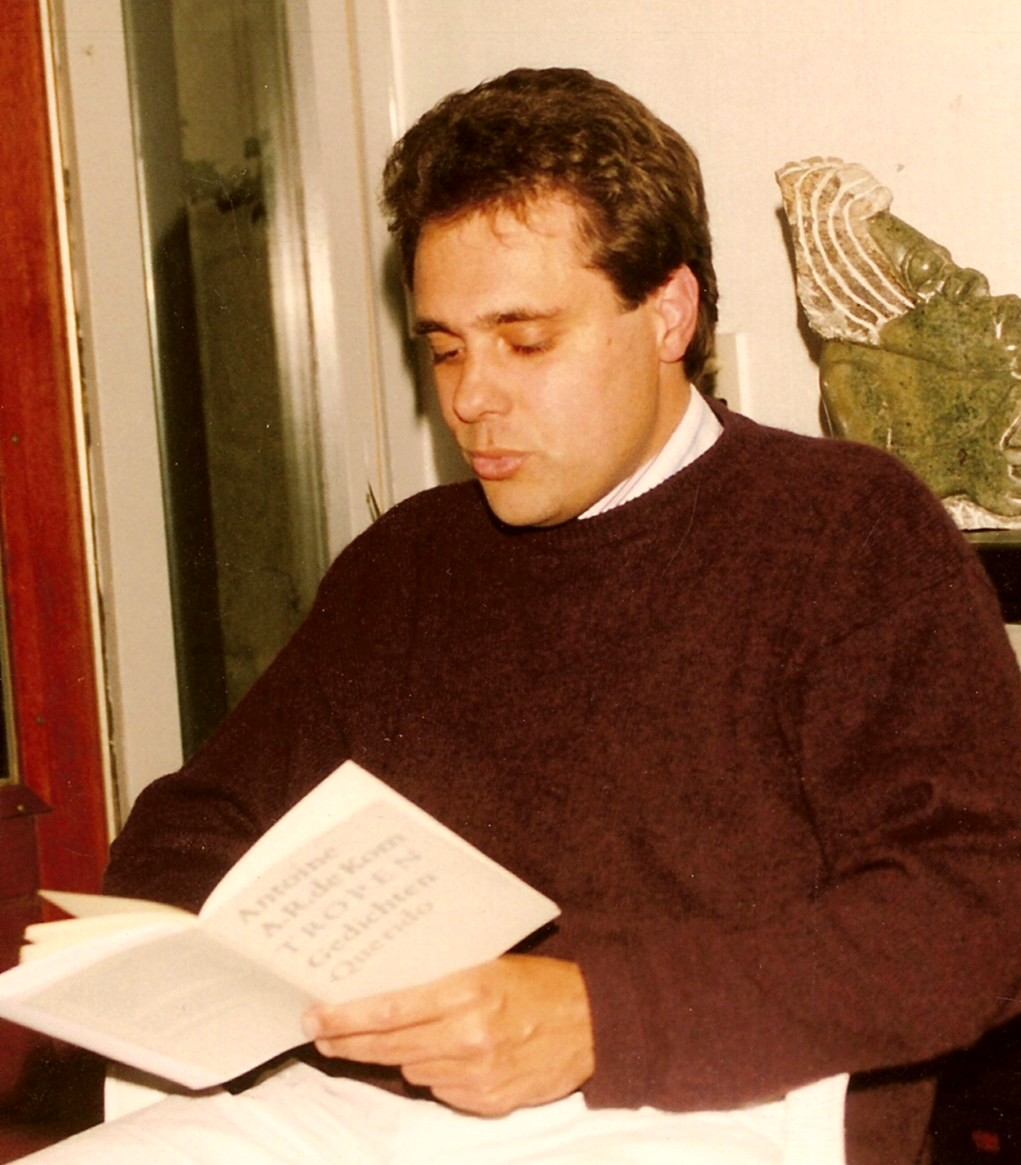
- Antoine de Kom (2006)
- Born: Antoine Adrianus Raymondus de Kom; 13 August 1956 (age 69); The Hague, Netherlands
- Other names: Raymond Sarucco
- Occupations: Psychiatrist, author, poet
- Notable work: Ritmisch zonder string (2013), Het misdadige brein (2012)

Antoine Adrianus Raymondus de Kom (born 13 August 1956) is a Dutch psychiatrist, writer and poet of Surinamese descent.

== Biography ==
His grandfather was Anton de Kom, the famous Surinamese resistance fighter and anti-colonialist. In 1966 the family moved to Paramaribo, Suriname, where he spend his formative years. In 1971, de Kom studied medicine at the University of Amsterdam after which he specialised in psychiatry. He started his career as a forensic psychiatrist at the Pieter Baan Centre.

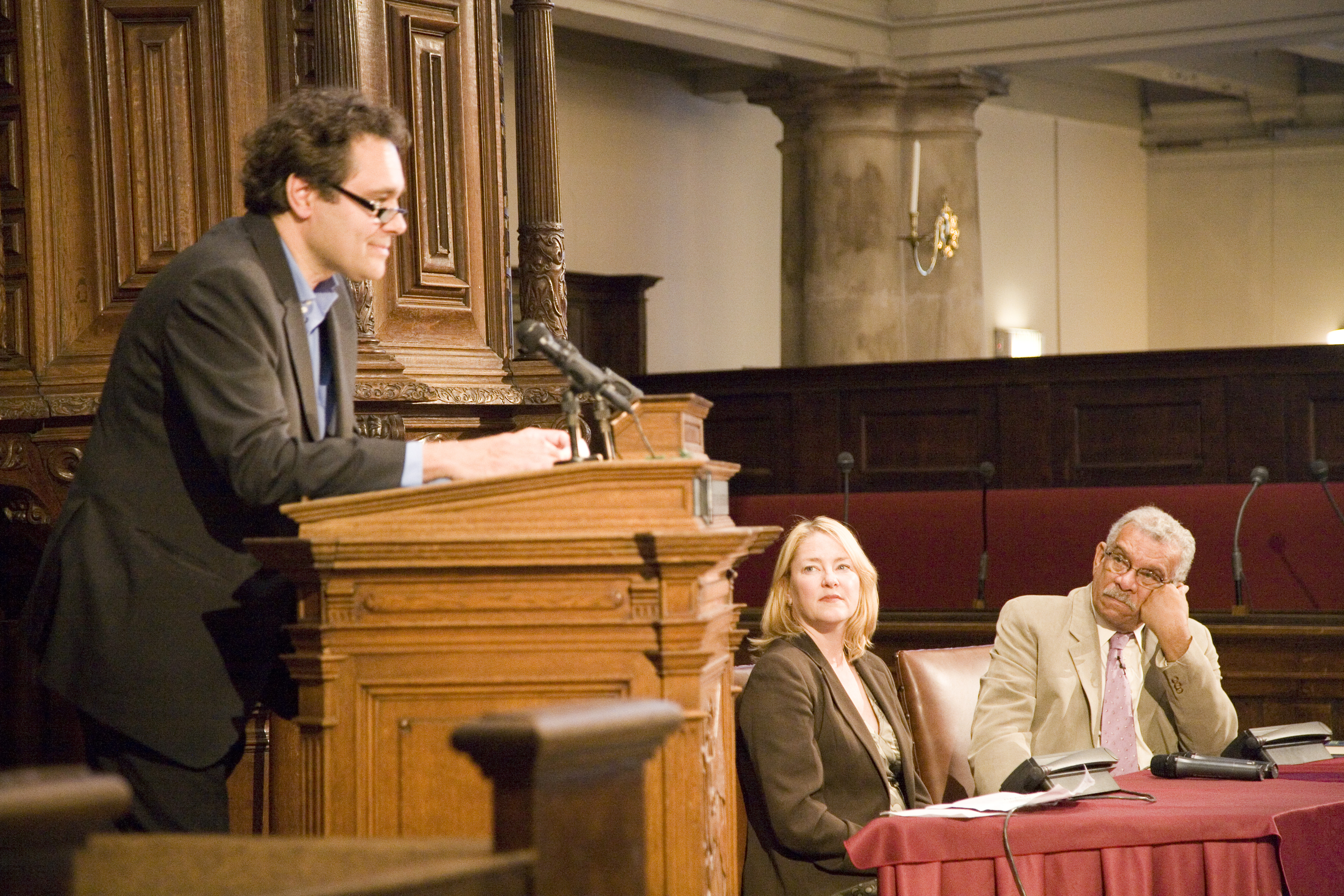
Antoine de Kom in 2012 at the first Cola Debrot Lecture. Photo: Bert Nienhuis

In 1981, he made his debut under the pseudonym Raymond Sarucco with Palmen in the magazine De Gids. The poems expressed de Kom's connection to the Caribbean and his fascination for their past and present. His first collection Tropen (1991) was nominated for the C. Buddingh'-prijs.

As a forensic psychiatrist, de Kom published Het misdadige brein: over het kwaad in onszelf (2012) in which he described fictitious conversations with historic criminals and despots.

In 2013, Antoine de Kom gave the third Cola Debrot Lecture about slavery. In 2014, Antoine de Kom was awarded VSB Poetry Prize for Ritmisch zonder string (2013). When asked whether de Kom considered his writings Surinamese literature, de Kom replied that he could not answer that; he is just as much an outcast as his grandfather.
