= Ida Gerhardt =

Dutch poet and classicist

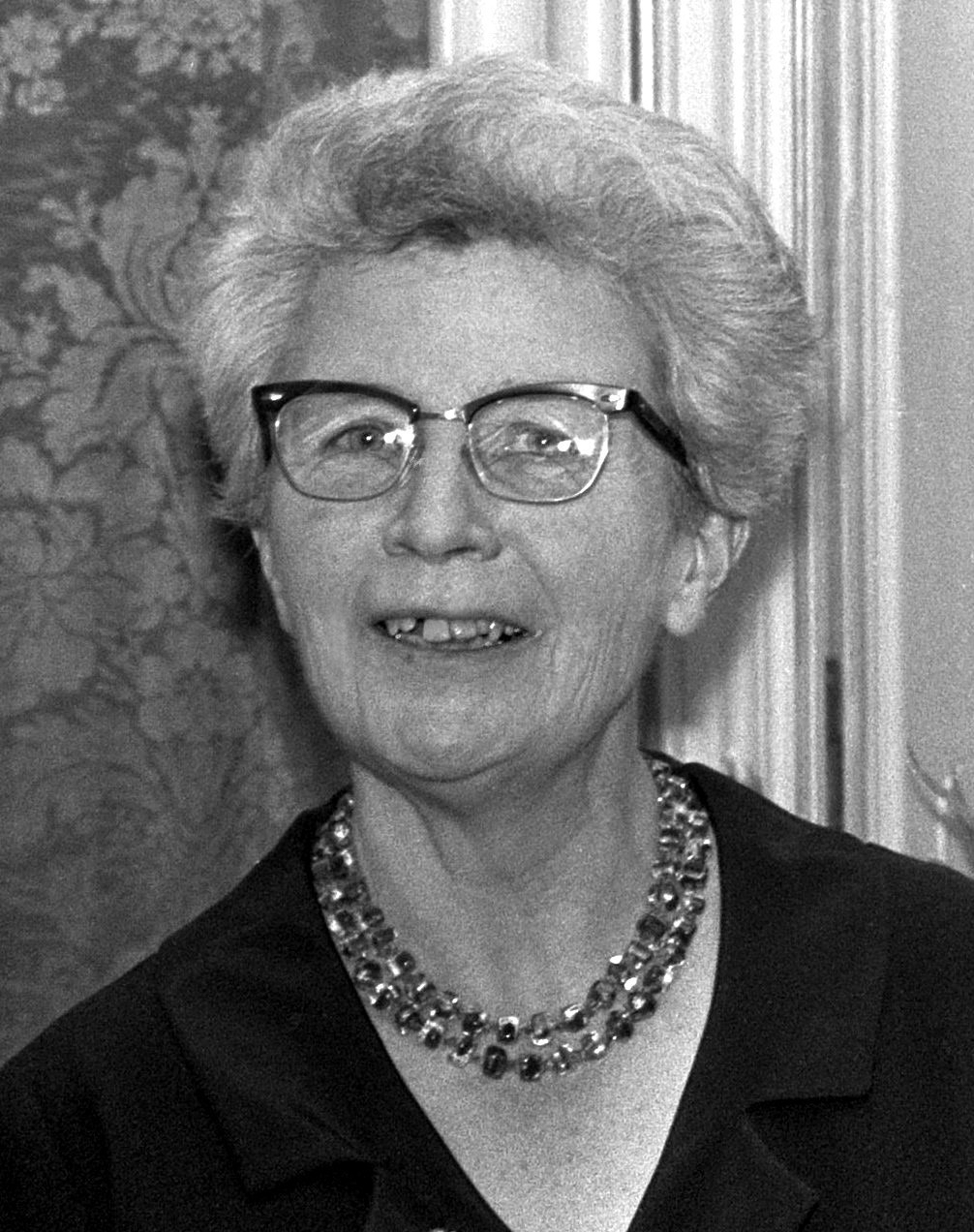
Ida Gerhardt (1968)

Ida Gerhardt (11 May 1905 in Gorinchem – 15 August 1997 in Warnsveld) was a classicist and Dutch poet of a post-symbolist tradition.

== Life ==
In her hometown Rotterdam Ida Gerhardt attended the Erasmus Gymnasium, where the poet J.H. Leopold was her Classics Teacher. He made an indelible impression on her. There she also met her future life partner Marie H. van der Zeyde. From 1924 to 1933 Gerhardt studied classical languages, first in Leiden and later in Utrecht. In 1942 she graduated cum laude on the translation of Lucretius' De rerum natura, Books I and V. From 1937 she was a teacher in Groningen, then in Kampen. In 1951, at the request of the non-conformist pedagogue Kees Boeke, she joined him at the school section of the Werkplaats Kindergemeenschap in Bilthoven. She retired in 1963 and settled in Eefde.

== Literary career ==
Just before the outbreak of World War II in May 1940, Ida Gerhardt made her debut with her first collection of poems, Kosmos. Her poems are characterized by a special focus on nature and landscape, especially the landscapes of the rivers Merwede, Waal, Lek and IJssel. Formed by her classical education and inspired by Christian beliefs, she does not confine to landscape descriptions, but always looks for kosmos, the unity in and of all creation. In her view there is meaning in nature and it is the poet's sacred duty to uncover this. Every poem is a complex network, full of sometimes mysterious relations between words, elements of nature, personal (even private) experiences, and the higher reality. Therefore, her work is often classified as symbolist or post-symbolist.

Gerhardt's poetry was published when another poetics prevailed, which meant that her poetry in official criticism remained in the shadow. A real appreciation of her work emerged from 1970 onwards. In 1979 she received the Award for Mastership from the Maatschappij der Nederlandse Letterkunde, in 1980 the P.C. Hooftprijs. She also received recognition for her careful translation of the Psalms, which she made together with her friend, Marie H. van der Zeyde (1972). For her Latin translations of Virgil she received the prestigious Martinus Nijhoff Award. Her Collected Poems appeared in 1980 and were reprinted several times.

The literary award Ida Gerhardt Poëzieprijs is named after her.

== Bibliography ==
- Kosmos (1940)
- De natuur en haar vormen (De rerum natura) (1942)
- Het veerhuis (1945)
- Buiten schot (1947)
- Bij de jaarwende (1948)
- Kwatrijnen in opdracht (1949)
- Vergilius' Het boerenbedrijf (Georgica) (1949)
- Sonnetten van een leraar (1951)
- Het levend monogram (1955)
- De argelozen (1956)
- De hovenier (1961)
- De slechtvalk (1966)
- De ravenveer (1970)
- Twee uur: de klokken antwoordden elkaar (1971)
- Vijf vuurstenen (1974)
- Vroege verzen (1978)
- Het sterreschip (1979)
- Nu ik hier iets zeggen mag (1980)
- Verzamelde gedichten (1980)
- Dolen en dromen (1980)
- De zomen van het licht (1983)
- De adelaarsvarens (1988)
- Hoefprent van Pegasus (1996)
- Gebroken lied: een vriendschap met Ida Gerhardt (1999)
- Verzamelde gedichten, in three parts, (1999)
- Zeven maal om de aarde te gaan (2001)

== Sources and references ==
- Anneke Reitsma, In de taal zelf verscholen : over de poëzie van Ida Gerhardt (Amsterdam : Arbeiderspers, 1983)
- Marie Helene van der Zeyde, De wereld van het vers : over het werk van Ida Gerhardt (Amsterdam : Athenaeum—Polak & Van Gennep, 1985)
- Ad ten Bosch, Gebroken lied : een vriendschap met Ida Gerhardt (Amsterdam : Athenaeum/Polak & Van Gennep, 1999)
