= Hanny Michaelis =

Dutch poet

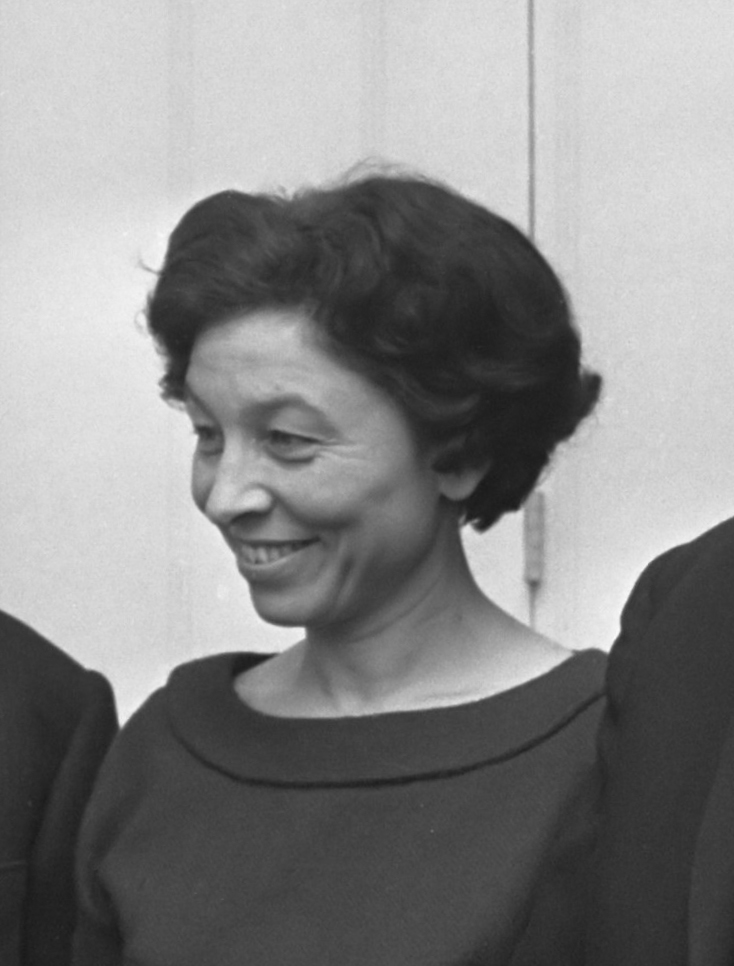
Hanny Michaelis (1966)

Hanny Michaelis (19 December 1922 – 11 June 2007) was a Dutch poet.

The daughter of Alfred Michaelis and Gonda Sara Swaab, both Jewish, she was born in Amsterdam.

Her parents were sent to Sobibór in 1943 and never returned. She lived in hiding from 1942 to 1945. After World War II, Michaelis worked for the Artistic Affairs department of the municipality of Amsterdam .

In 1948, she married the writer Gerard Kornelis van het Reve; they separated in 1959.

She was awarded the Anna Bijns Prize in 1996.

Her work has a prevailing tone of melancholy, loneliness and despair, although her last collection of poems has a more vital tone to it and moments of humour.

Michaelis died in Amsterdam at the age of 84.

== Poetry collections ==
- Klein voorspel (Little prelude) (1949)
- Water uit de rots (Water from the rock) (1957)
- Tegen de wind in (Against the wind) (1962)
- Onvoorzien (Unforeseen) (1966); received the Jan Campert Prize
- De rots van Gibraltar (The Rock of Gibraltar) (1970)
- Wegdraven naar een nieuw Utopia (Running off toward a new Utopia) (1971)
