= Hugues C. Pernath =

Flemish poet

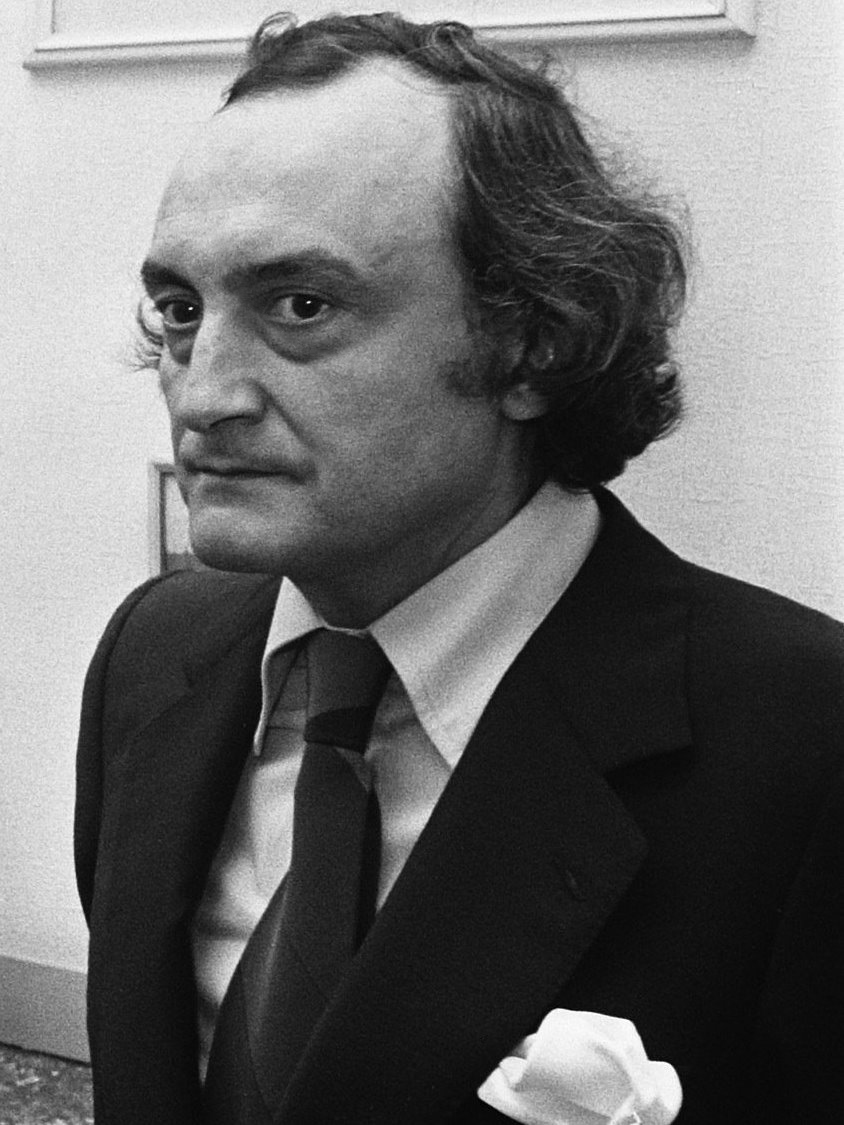
Pernath (1974)

Hugues C. Pernath (pseudonym of Hugo Wouters, 15 August 1931 in Borgerhout – 4 June 1975 in Borgerhout) was a Belgian writer. Together with Paul Snoek, he founded the avant garde magazine Gard Sivik, and he was a member of the Pink Poets. The literary award Hugues C. Pernath-prijs is named after him.

== Bibliography ==
- Het uur Marat (1958)
- De adem ik (1960)
- Het masker man (1960)
- Soldatenbrieven (1961)
- Hedendaags (1963)
- Instrumentarium voor een winter (1963)
- Mijn gegeven woord (1966)
- De acht hoofdzonden (1970)
- Exodus (1970)
- Mijn tegenstem (1973)

== Awards ==
- 1961 - Arkprijs van het Vrije Woord
- 1968 - Poëzie-prijs van de provincie Antwerpen
- 1977 - Driejaarlijkse Staatsprijs voor Poëzie

== Sources ==
- Hugues C. Pernath
- Fernand Auwera, ‘Hugues C. Pernath’ In: Schrijven of schieten. Interviews (1969)
