= Anneke Brassinga =

Dutch writer and translator

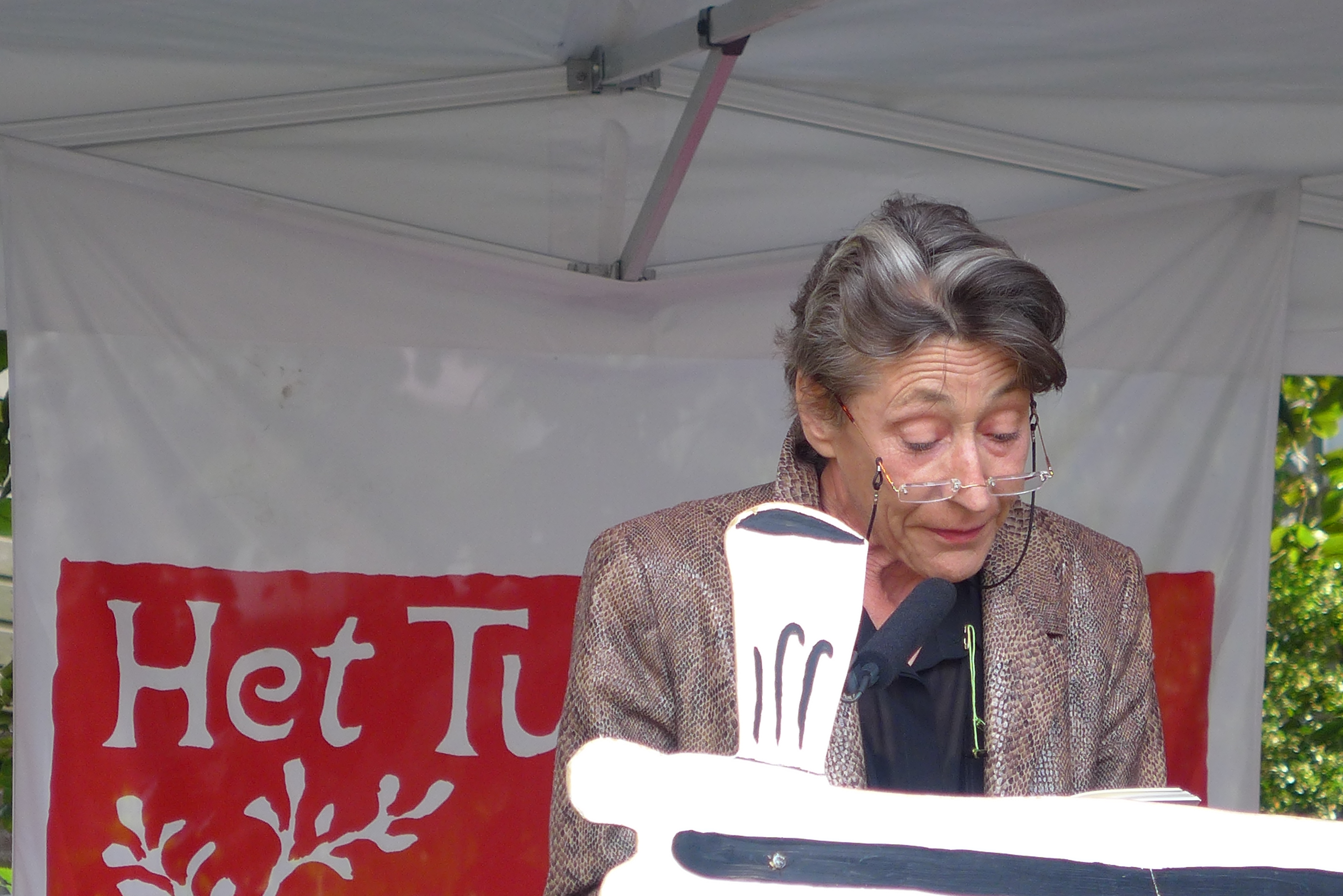
Portrait of Anneke Brassinga in 2015

Anneke Brassinga (born 20 August 1948, in Schaarsbergen, Gelderland) is a Dutch writer and translator. She was awarded the Constantijn Huygens Prize in 2008, and has received numerous other prizes as well.

== Life and career ==
Brassinga studied Translation Studies in Amsterdam. She works as a literary translator, and has translated the works of the following authors into Dutch: George Orwell, Oscar Wilde, Vladimir Nabokov, Samuel Beckett, Sylvia Plath, Patricia Highsmith, W.H. Auden, Hermann Broch, Jean Jacques Rousseau, Marcel Proust, and Jules Verne.

She is considered a postmodern writer, but she prefers to see herself as surrealist. The themes of her poetry are nature, love, the vulnerability of beauty and language.

== Works ==
=== Poetry ===
- Aurora (1987)
- Landgoed (1989)
- Thule (1991)
- Zeemeeuw in boomvork (1994)
- Huisraad (1998)
- Verschiet (2001)
- Timiditeiten (2003)
- Wachtwoorden. Verzamelde herziene gedichten, 1987-2003. (2005)(with cd)
  - Wachtwoorden. Verzamelde herziene gedichten, 1987-2015. (2015)
- IJsgang (2006)
- Ontij (2010)
- Het wederkerige (2014)
- Verborgen tuinen (2019)

=== Prose ===
- Hartsvanger (1993)
- Hapschaar (1998, 2018) - short stories
- Het zere been (2002) - essays
- Tussen vijf en twaalf (2005) - letters
- Bloeiend puin (2008) - essays
- as co-author: Het zere been: essays & diversen (2015)
- Grondstoffen (2015) - essays

== Awards ==
- 2015: P.C. Hooft Award for her poetry
- 2008:Constantijn Huygens Prize for her overall oeuvre
- 2005:Anna Bijns Prize for Timiditeiten
- 2002:VSB Poetry Award for Verschiet
- 2002:Ida Gerhardt Poëzieprijs for Verschiet
- 2001:ECI Prize
- 2001:Paul Snoek Prize for Huisraad
- 1990:Herman Gorter Prize for Landgoed
- 1985:Trevanian Poetry Prize
