= Paul Snoek =

Flemish poet

- Born: Edmond André Coralie Schietekat; 17 December 1933; Sint-Niklaas, Belgium
- Died: 19 October 1981 (aged 47); Tielt, Belgium
- Occupation: poet

Edmond André Coralie Schietekat (17 December 1933 – 19 October 1981) pseudonym Paul Snoek, was a Belgian poet. He was a son of Omer William Schietekat, a textile manufacturer, and Paula Sylvia Snoeck. In 1961, he married Maria Magdalena Vereecke (Mylène), and together they had three children, a twin Jan and Paul in 1963 and in 1966 Sophie. He died in a car accident in Egem.

== Early life and education ==
At the Nuns Catholic School in Berkenboom he was considered a mediocre student. He went to high school at the Sint-Lievenscollege in Antwerp and the Sint-Jozef Klein Seminarie in Sint-Niklaas, where he had Anton van Wilderode as a teacher. As a young boy he already showed interest in nature and painting. During the war his father earned a living making paintings that he sold to the local farmers or exchanged for food. For a while he studied law and philology at the University of Ghent. In 1955, together with Hugues C. Pernath, he founded the avant-garde journal the Gard Sivik (civil guard).

== Career ==
After his military service in Germany (1956–1957) he decided to become a full-time artist, yet he soon changed his mind. He started working in his father's textile factory and visited several countries as a salesman. In 1963, he founded his own import - and export company of Japanese printed silk. Afterwards he became sales director in a company specialized in pile foundations. In 1967 he bought a farm in Slijpe and started to paint again in 1972, this time with more success. Several exhibitions followed. His paintings sold so well that he started working part-time for Atlas and then, in 1975, fully committed himself to painting. Paul Snoek became an editor of the Nieuw Vlaams Tijdschrift. In his free time he collected antiques and was an amateur motocross rider. He was a close friend of Gaston Burssens.

== Awards ==
- Arkprijs van het Vrije Woord 1963.
- Driejaarlijkse Staatsprijs voor de Vlaamse poëzie 1969 for De zwarte muze.
- Jan Campert-prijs 1971.
- Eugène Baie-prijs 1972.

== Bibliography ==
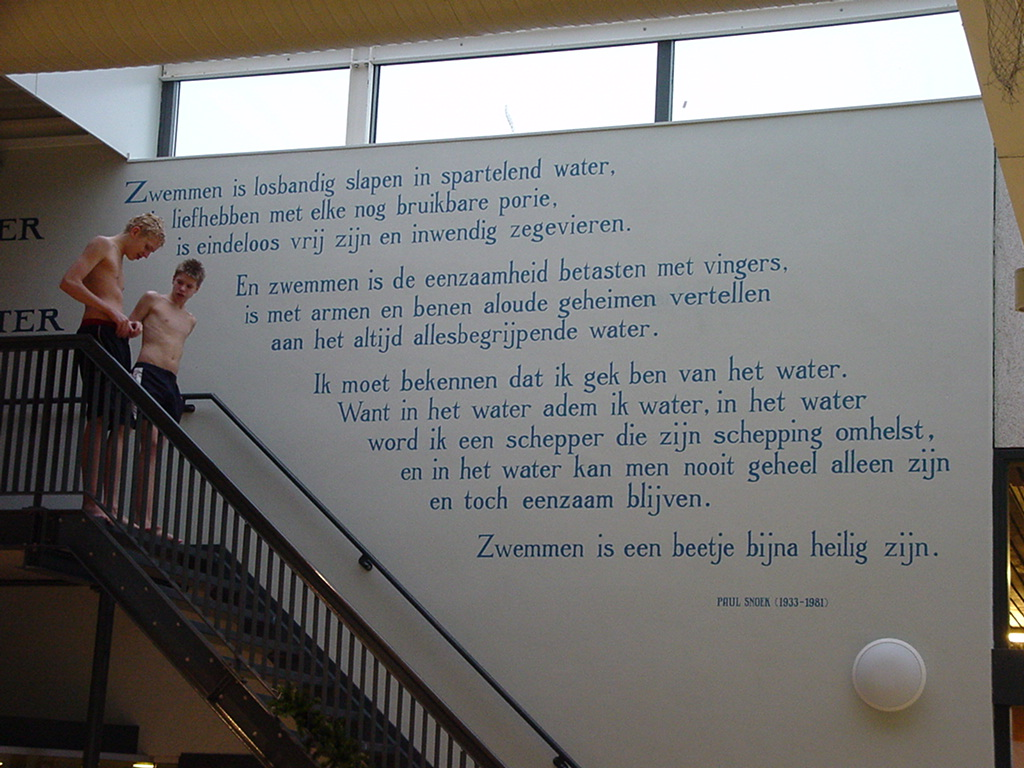
Poem by Paul Snoek in swimming pool 'De Zijl' in Leiden

- Archipel (poetry, 1954)
- Noodbrug (poetry, 1955)
- Tussen vel en vlees (poetry, 1956)
- Aardrijkskunde (poetry, 1956)
- Reptielen en amfibieën (prose, 1957)
- Ik rook een vredespijp (poetry, 1957)
- De heilige gedichten (poetry, 1959)
- Hercules (poetry, 1960)
- Richelieu (poetry, 1961)
- Soldatenbrieven (prose, together with Hugues C. Pernath)
- Renaissance (poetry, 1963)
- Nostradamus (poetry, 1963)
- Op de grens van land en zee (poetry, 1964)
- De zwarte muze (poetry, 1967)
- Gedichten 1954-1968 (poetry, 1969)
- Gedichten voor Maria Magdalena (poetry, 1971)
- Gedichten (poetry, 1971)
- Een hondsdolle tijd (prose, 1971)
- Bultaco 250 cc (prose, 1972)
- Kwaak- en kruipdieren (prose, republishing Reptielen en amfibieën, 1972)
- Frankenstein, nagelaten gedichten (poetry, 1973)
- Ik heb vannacht de liefde uitgevonden (poetry, 1973)
- Welkom in mijn onderwereld (poetry, 1978)
- Verzamelde gedichten (poetry, 1983)

== See also ==
- Flemish literature

== Sources ==
- Paul Snoek
- Paul Snoek
