= Nachoem Wijnberg =

Dutch poet and writer

Nachoem Mesoelam (Nachoem) Wijnberg (Amsterdam, 13 April 1961) is a poet and author from the Netherlands. He studied at the University of Amsterdam and received his Ph.D. at the Rotterdam School of Management. Since 2005 he is lecturing business administration at the University of Amsterdam. In 2008 he won the Ida Gerhardt Poëzieprijs. In 2018, Wijnberg won the P.C. Hooft Award for his entire oeuvre.

== Bibliography ==
- 2016 - Uit tien
- 2015 - Van groot belang
- 2013 - Nog een grap
- 2011 - Als ik als eerste aankom
- 2009 - Divan van Ghalib (Poem)
- 2008 - Het leven van (Poem)
- 2006 - Liedjes (Poem)
- 2005 - De opvolging (Novel)
- 2004 - Eerst dit dan dat (Poem)
- 2003 - Uit 7 (Poem)
- 2002 - Politiek en liefde (Novel)
- 2001 - Vogels (Poem)
- 1999 - De joden (Novel)
- 1997 - Landschapsseks (Novel)
- 1998 - Alvast (Poem)
- 1996 - Geschenken (Poem)
- 1994 - Is het dan goed (Poem)
- 1993 - Langzaam en zacht (Poem)
- 1991 - De expeditie naar Cathay (Poem)
- 1990 - De voorstelling in de nachtclub (Poem)
- 1989 - De simulatie van de schepping (Poem)
