= List of Dutch poets =

The following is a list of Dutch poets.

== A ==
- Bertus Aafjes
- Gerrit Achterberg
- Anne van Amstel
- Hans Andreus
- Reyer Anslo
- Jan Arends (Jan [Johannes Cornelis] Arends)
- Armando
- Bernardo Ashetu

== B ==
- Barlaeus (Kaspar van Baerle)
- Maria Barnas
- Jacobus Bellamy
- Charles Beltjens
- M. H. Benders
- Nel Benschop
- Joost Berman
- J. Bernlef
- Anna Bijns
- Willem Bilderdijk
- J. C. Bloem
- Jan Boerstoel
- Louis Paul Boon
- Joan van Broekhuizen
- C. Buddingh'

== C ==
- Jan Campert
- Remco Campert
- Jacob Cats
- Bart Chabot
- Hugo Claus
- Isaäc da Costa

== D ==
- Maria van Daalen
- Jan Michiel Dautzenberg
- Jules Deelder
- Aagje Deken
- F. van Dixhoorn
- Hans Dorrestijn
- Bart FM Droog

== E ==
- Margriet Ehlen
- Willem Elsschot
- Anna Enquist

== F ==
- Hans Faverey
- Willem Godschalck van Focquenbroch

== G ==
- Eva Gerlach
- Guido Gezelle
- Herman Gorter

== H ==
- Haan, Jacob Israël de
- Hadewijch
- Jan Hanlo
- Elma van Haren
- Jan Frederik Helmers
- Toon Hermans
- Judith Herzberg
- Rozalie Hirs
- Pieter 't Hoen
- Pieter Corneliszoon Hooft
- Jotie T'Hooft
- Constantijn Huygens

== J ==
- Esther Jansma

== K ==
- Jan Kal
- Willem Kloos
- Hester Knibbe
- Antoine de Kom
- Gerrit Komrij
- Gerrit Krol

== L ==
- Cynthia Lenige
- Katharyne Lescailje
- Lucebert (Lubertus Jacobus Swaanswijk)
- Gerry van der Linden

== M ==
- Jacob van Maerlant
- Paul Marijnis
- Hendrik Marsman
- Vonne van der Meer
- Lucretia Wilhelmina van Merken
- Erik Menkveld
- Willem de Mérode (Willem Eduard Keuning)
- Saul van Messel (Jaap Meijer)
- Hanny Michaelis
- Judith Mok

== N ==
- Nescio (J.H.F. Grönloh)
- Martinus Nijhoff

== O ==
- Paul van Ostaijen
- Willem Jan Otten

== P ==
- Piet Paaltjens (François HaverSchmidt)
- Ester Naomi Perquin
- Ilja Leonard Pfeijffer
- Hugo Pos

== R ==
- Jean-Pierre Rawie
- Albrecht Rodenbach
- Astrid Roemer
- Hannie Rouweler

== S ==
- Annie M.G. Schmidt
- Anna Maria van Schurman
- Johannes Secundus
- Shrinivási
- J. Slauerhoff
- Michaël Slory
- Pem Sluijter
- Albertina Soepboer
- Lucienne Stassaert

== V ==
- Adriaen Valerius
- M. Vasalis (Margaretha Droogleever Fortuyn-Leenmans)
- Martinus Veltman
- André Verbart
- Peter Verhelst
- Albert Verwey
- Simon Vestdijk
- Simon Vinkenoog
- Anton van Duinkerken
- Eddy van Vliet
- Joost van den Vondel
- Ida Vos
- Hendrik de Vries
- Leo Vroman

== W ==
- Willem die Madocke maecte
- Elly de Waard
- Willem Wilmink
- Ans Wortel
