= PEM =

PEM or Pem may refer to:

== Science and technology ==
- Photoelastic modulator, an optical device
- Polyelectrolyte multilayer, thin films
- Proton-exchange membrane, semipermeable
- Porous European Mix, another name for asphalt concrete

=== Computing and electronics ===
- Plastic encapsulated microcircuits, a method for packaging microcircuits
- Power entry module, used in electrical appliances
- PCI Express Mini, a computer bus standard
- Privacy-Enhanced Mail, whose file format is also often used for X.509 certificates

=== Medicine ===
- Polioencephalomalacia, neurological disease in ruminants
- Protein–energy malnutrition, malnutrition arising from insufficient protein or calories in one's diet
- Pediatric emergency medicine
- Positron emission mammography, a nuclear medicine imaging modality
- Post-exertional malaise, worsening of symptoms after a small amount of activity

== Places ==
- Peabody Essex Museum, an art and historical museum located in Salem, Massachusetts, US
- Padre Aldamiz International Airport (IATA code), Madre de Dios, Peru
- Pemberton railway station (National Rail station code), England
- Pembrokeshire (Chapman code), a county in Wales

== People ==
- Pem Sluijter (1939–2007), Dutch poet

== Other uses ==
- PEM nut or swage nut, a type of nut or threaded insert
- Private electronic market, using the Internet to connect select parties in one market
