= Eddy Hoost =

Surinamese politician and lawyer

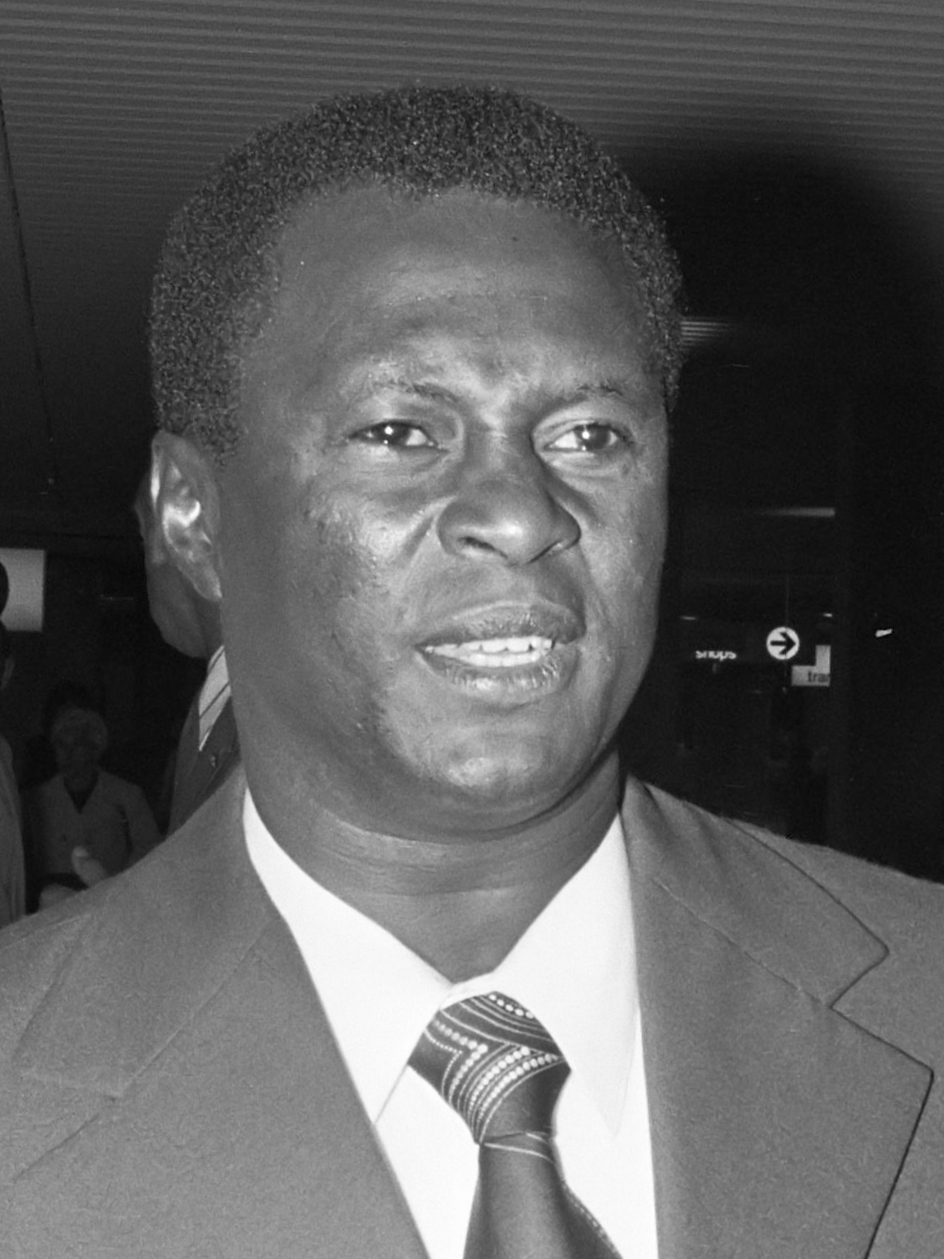
- Hoost in 1975

Minister of Justice and Police
- In office 1973–1977
- Preceded by: Jnan Hansdev Adhin
- Succeeded by: Soerdj Badrising

Minister of Defence
- In office 25 November 1975 – 1977
- Preceded by: Office established
- Succeeded by: Henck Arron

Personal details
- Born: Edmund Alexander Hoost; 21 October 1934; Suriname
- Died: 8 December 1982 (aged 48); Paramaribo, Suriname
- Occupation: Politician, lawyer

Edmund Alexander Hoost (21 October 1934 – 8 December 1982) was a Surinamese politician and lawyer. He was Minister of Justice and Police between 1973 and 1977. After the independence of Suriname, he became the first Minister of Defence and served until 1977. He was one of the victims of the December murders.

== Biography ==
Hoost studied at the Law School in Suriname with Hugo Pos and Harold Riedewald. In 1970, together with Eddy Bruma and Roy Adama, he founded the trade union Centrale-47 (C-47), after mass strikes in 1969, demanded a new and more progressive type of labor organization. C-47 became largest trade union in Suriname, after the Mother Union, a trade union closely connected with the National Party of Suriname. In 1973, Hoost became Minister of Justice and Police in the first National Party Combination (NPK I) cabinet, headed by Henck Arron, on behalf of the Nationalist Republican Party (PNR).

The primary agenda of the PNR was the preparation of Suriname for independence. Once in government, negotiations started with the Dutch government headed by Prime Minister Joop den Uyl. Hoost was part of Surinamese delegation to negotiate the exit out of the Kingdom of the Netherlands. From 1954 until independence, Suriname was, like the Netherlands and the Netherlands Antilles, officially an equal partner within the Kingdom of the Netherlands, but foreign affairs and defense were kingdom affairs. As the Justice minister, Hoost was responsible for the transition of the Netherlands Armed Forces in Suriname (TRIS) into the Surinamese Armed Forces (SKM). After independence on 25 November 1975, Hoost became the first Minister of Defence. During the electoral campaign for the 1977 elections, the PNR ended co-operation with the NPS.

In 1980, a military coup took place in Suriname under the leadership of Dési Bouterse. In 1981, Hoost, together with other former ministers of the NPK I and II, were arrested on charges of corruption. The detainees were tortured and eventually released without a fair trial. He was finally released in 1982. On 11 March 1982, army officers Surendre Rambocus, Jiwansingh Sheombar and Wilfred Hawker staged a counter-coup. The insurgency failed and Hawker was executed, while Rambocus and others were arrested. Hoost, together with the lawyers John Baboeram and Harold Riedewald, took on the defense of Rambocus at his court-martial. On 3 December the court sentenced Rambocus to 12 years in prison with forced labour.

In the early morning of 8 December 1982, Hoost, Baboeram, Riedewald and 11 others were arrested and imprisoned in Fort Zeelandia, while Rambocus and Sheombar were transferred from the Memre Boekoe barracks, Santo Boma prison to Fort Zeelandia. An undisclosed number of individuals were executed, including Hoost. The only survivor was trade union leader Fred Derby, who was freed. Hoost is buried at the Mariusrust cemetery.

Hoost was married. He was father of three daughters and one son.
