= Dixhoorn =

Dixhoorn or Van Dixhoorn is a surname. Notable people with the surname include:

- Chad Van Dixhoorn (born 1971), Canadian-born theologian and historian
- François Henricus Anthonie van Dixhoorn (born 1948), Dutch poet
