= Han G. Hoekstra =

Dutch poet (1906–1988)

Han Gerard Hoekstra
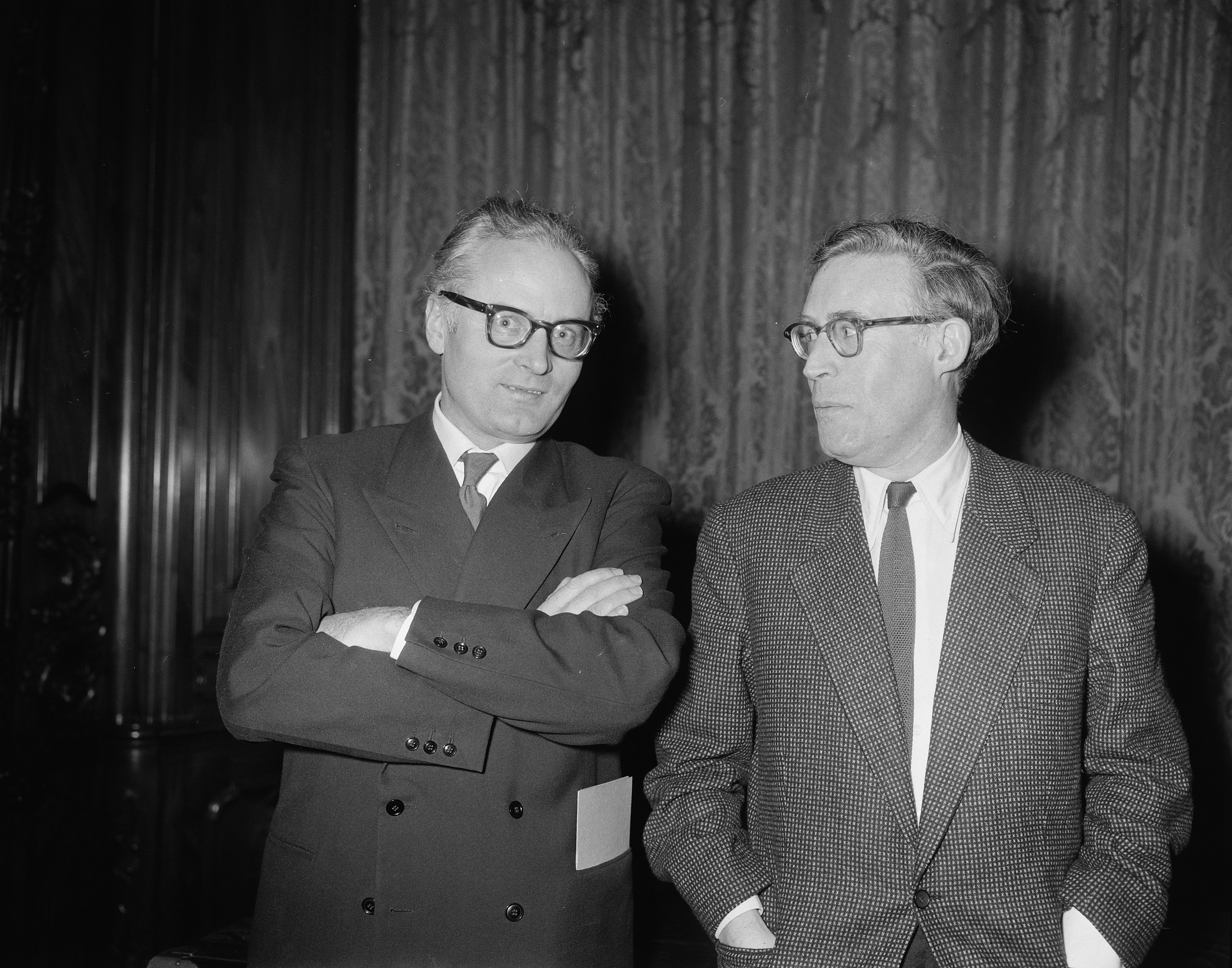
- Piet Esser & Han G. Hoekstra (1957)
- Born: 4 September 1906; The Hague, South Holland, Netherlands
- Died: 15 April 1988 (aged 81); Amsterdam, North Holland, Netherlands
- Occupation: Poet
- Writing career
- Genre: Children's literature

Han Gerard Hoekstra (4 September 1906 – 15 April 1988) was a Dutch poet, best known for his children's literature.

== Early life and education ==
He was born in The Hague, South Holland, Netherlands. He was the son of Gatze Hoekstra and Adriana Maria Rooth. His father was a sculptor from Leeuwarden.

== Career ==
=== Awards ===
Hoekstra won numerous awards throughout his career, including the 1972 Constantijn Huygens Prize, an annual Dutch literary award.

== Death ==
He died, age 81, in Amsterdam, North Holland, Netherlands.

== See also ==
- List of children's literature authors
- List of Dutch poets
