= Surinamese Land Forces =

Land component of the national army of Suriname

- Surinaamse Landmacht
- Founded: 1980; 45 years ago
- Country: Suriname
- Branch: Infantry Corps; Special Forces Corps; Support Arm Corps; Military Police Corps
- Type: Army
- Role: Land warfare
- Size: 1,000
- Part of: Suriname National Army
- Headquarters: Memre Boekoe barracks, Paramaribo
- Nickname(s): NL
- Colours: Green and yellow
- March: 22 March
- Engagements: 1980 Surinamese coup d'état 1990 Surinamese coup d'état

Commanders
- Commander: Lieutenant Colonel Ashok Jagdew

The Surinamese Land Forces (Dutch: Surinaamse Landmacht) is the land component of the Suriname National Army (SNA). It is the largest service branch of the Suriname National Army.

== Organization ==
The army consists of some 1,000 personnel and has 4 divisions. The current commander of the Surinamese Land Forces is Lieutenant Colonel Ashok Jagdew.

== History ==
Upon independence in 1975, the military of Suriname became Surinamese Armed Forces (Surinaamse Krijgsmacht). After a coup on 25 February 1980, the armed forces became the National Army (Nationaal Leger). In 1980 the Surinamese Land Forces was formed as a division of the National Army.

== Equipment ==
Weapon	Country manufactured	Cartridge	Quantity	Pictures	Notes
Pistols
Beretta 92	Italy	9×19mm			Standard pistol of Surinamese Military
Assault rifles
FN FAL	Belgium	7.62×51mm NATO			Standard rifle of Surinamese Military
AKM	Soviet Union	7.62×39mm			In service
FN F2000	Belgium	5.56×45mm NATO			Used by some units
CETME Model L	Spain	5.56×45mm NATO			Used for parades
FAMAS	France	5.56×45mm NATO			Future standard Surinamese service rifle, donated by France in September 2023 to replace previously issued rifles
Submachine guns
Uzi	Israel	9×19mm Parabellum			In service
FN P90	Belgium	FN 5.7×28mm			In service
Machine guns
FN Minimi	Belgium United States	5.56×45mm NATO			In service
FN MAG	Belgium	7.62×51mm NATO			In service
Grenade launchers
RPG-7	Soviet Union	40mm			In service
Shotguns
Mossberg 500	United States	12 gauge			In Service
Armoured personnel carriers
EE-11 Urutu	Brazil		16		In service
EE-9 Cascavel	Brazil		45		In service
DAF YP-408	Netherlands		5		In service
Trucks
DAF YA 4440	Netherlands				In service
