= Erik Menkveld =

Dutch poet (1959–2014)

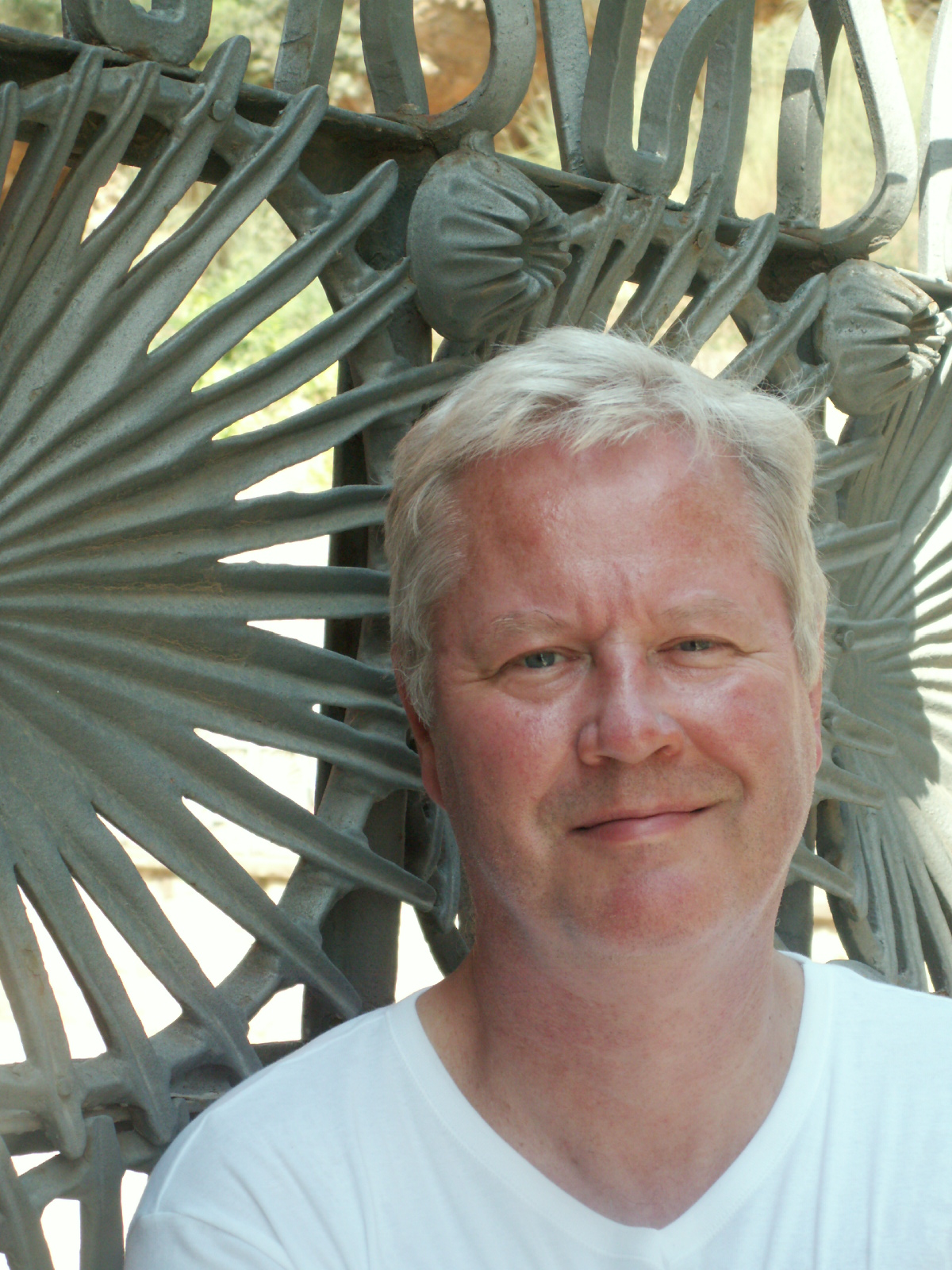
- Erik Menkveld in 2013
- Born: Erik Jan Willem Menkveld; 25 April 1959; Eindhoven, Netherlands
- Died: 30 March 2014 (aged 54); Amsterdam, Netherlands
- Occupation: Poet

Erik Jan Willem Menkveld (25 April 1959 – 30 March 2014) was a Dutch poet.

== Early life ==
Erik Jan Willem Menkveld was born on 25 April 1959 on in Eindhoven, Netherlands. He was an only child

== Career ==
Between 1987 and 1998 Menkveld worked at publishing company De Bezige Bij. In 1995, he published Achter het behang, a Dutch translation of the German work Der kleine Erziehungsberater by Axel Hacke. In the same year he also published Koebeest en vrouwdier.

Menkveld made his debut with poetry collection De karpersimulator (1997) which was published by De Bezige Bij. He won the C. Buddingh'-prijs for this debut but did not receive the award as Menkveld was working at Poetry International at the time, the organisation behind the award. Menkveld also won the Lucy B. and C.W. van der Hoogt Prize for De karpersimulator. In 1998 he was also nominated for the VSB Poetry Prize for this debut.

His second poetry collection Schapen nu! was published by De Bezige Bij in 2001 and his third poetry collection Prime time followed in 2005, this time published by Van Oorschot.

== Recognition and awards ==
For Schapen nu! he was nominated for the Hugues C. Pernath-prijs as well as the J.C. Bloem-poëzieprijs.

In 2008, he was one of the nominees to become Dichter des Vaderlands, an unofficial title for the poet laureate of the Netherlands, along with Hagar Peeters, Joke van Leeuwen, and Ramsey Nasr.

Other awards include:

- 1998: C. Buddingh'-prijs, for De karpersimulator (won, but not awarded)
- 1999: Lucy B. en C.W. van der Hoogt-prijs, for De karpersimulator
- 2012: Academica Literatuurprijs, for his 2011 novel Het grote zwijgen

== Personal life and death ==
Menkveld was married to Maria Vlaar.

He died of cardiac arrest on 30 March 2014 in Amsterdam. He is buried at Zorgvlied.

== Publications ==
- Briefwisseling met R.N. Roland en H. Roland Holst-Van der Schalk (1990)
- Koebeest en vrouwdier (1995)
- De karpersimulator (1997)
- Honderd jaar Nobelprijspoëzie (2000)
- Schapen nu! (2001)
- Prime time (2005)
- Met de meeste hoogachting (2006)
- Het grote zwijgen (2011)
- Verzamelde gedichten (2016)
