= Bluebillgurgle =

1942 poem by Cornelis Buddingh

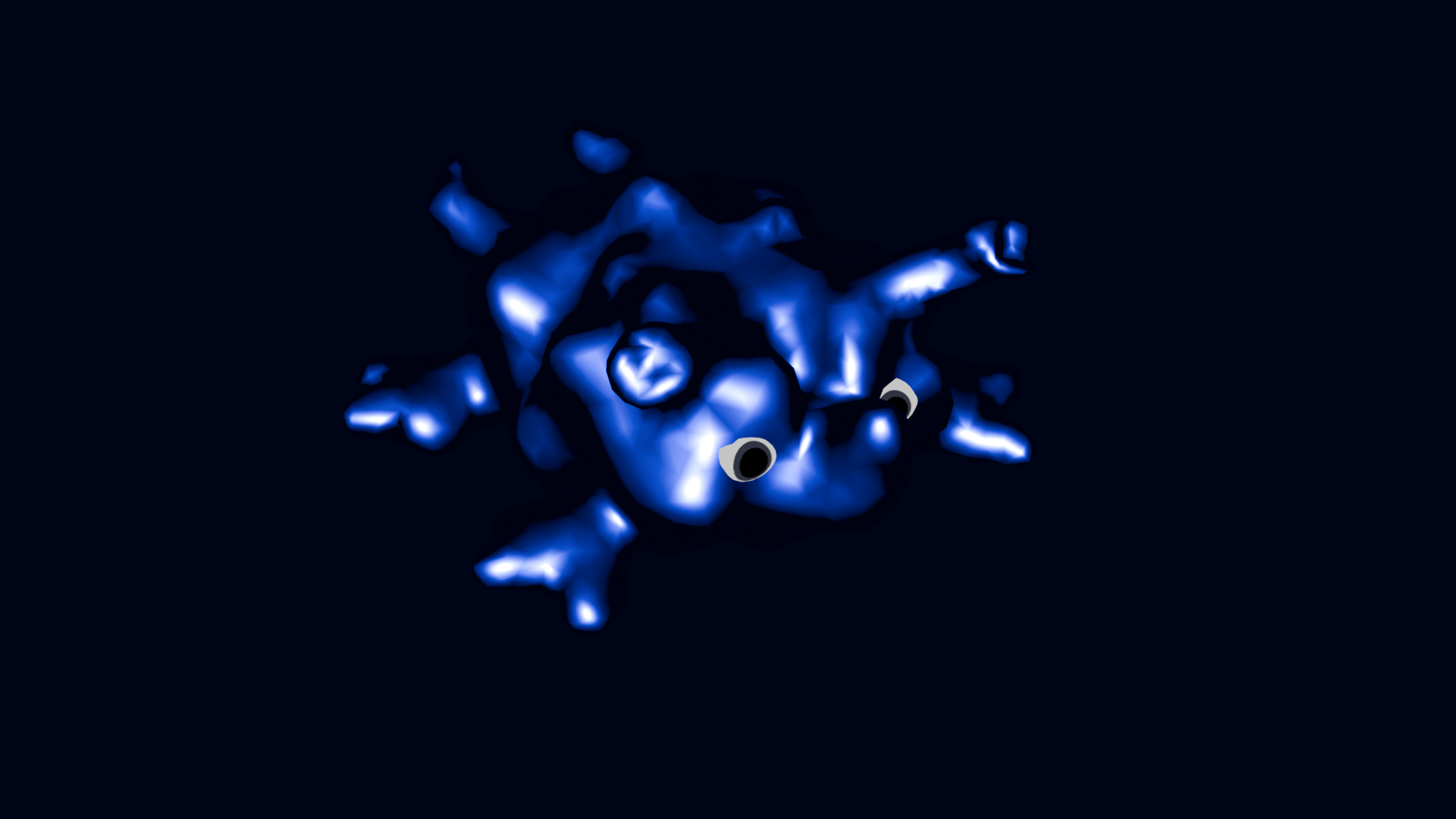
Maybe a Bluebillgurgle.

The Bluebillgurgle is a Dutch poem from 1942, written by C. Buddingh'. He wrote it soon after he was taken in the sanatorium Zonnegloren for tuberculosis and read a story by the English children's book writer Edith Nesbit which contained a bluebillgurgle, and there followed another 72 about imaginary creatures, under which the pantippel, the simmelot, the waxnoserhino and the silversandhare. Soon before Buddingh's death a new series of gurglerhymes appeared in the bundle New Gurglerhymes (1985).

In the poem Buddingh' uses parallelism on different levels: the four couplets have the same construction: they have a strict rhythm, following the rhyme scheme aa-bbb, opening with basically the same first sentence and ending with a tricolon. The last words of each second line form a paronomasia that rhymes with bluebillgurgle.

The bluebillgurgle is apparently a living creature that gives a description of birth till death: one time it refers to itself as the bluebillgurgle, the three times after it refers to itself as a bluebillgurgle.

It makes correct sentences, but with neologisms that leave everything to the imagination like [I] knuster with my knezidon. Existing words like wok en reap seam to not be used as their normal definition. The creature references its diet and its life style, but only its name gives a suggestion of its appearance. Its parents are a porgle and a porulan. In the story the sun and the nightowl get referenced and the creature predicts that after its death it will shrink into a blue pebble.
