= Baal Oemrawsingh =

Surinamese politician

National Assembly of Suriname
- In office 1977 – August 1980

Personal details
- Born: Baal Indradj Oemrawsingh; 25 August 1940; Nickerie, Suriname
- Died: March 1982 (aged 41); Suriname
- Political party: Progressive Reform Party (VHP)
- Occupation: Academic, chemist, politician

Baal Indradj Oemrawsingh (25 August 1940 – March 1982) was a Surinamese professor of biochemistry at the University of Suriname, and member of the National Assembly of Suriname between 1977 and 1980. He was considered the political leader behind the Rambocus Coup of March 1982. He was one of the victims killed by the military regime of Dési Bouterse.

== Biography ==
Oemrawsingh was born into an Indo-Surinamese family in the Nickerie District. He had a twin brother called Sugrim Oemrawsingh.

On 22 November 1972, Oemrawsingh received his doctorate in the Netherlands at the Free University Amsterdam in biochemistry. On 1 January 1973, started working as a biochemistry professor at the University of Suriname. In 1977, he was elected to the National Assembly of Suriname. In August 1980, five months after the 1980 Surinamese coup d'état, parliament was suspended.

In March 1982, he was arrested by the military, because of his involvement in the failed counter-coup by Surendre Rambocus and others against the rule of military leader Dési Bouterse. Oemrawsingh was considered the political leader of the counter-coup and was imprisoned and scheduled to be tried. It did not come to a verdict, he was killed. His body was discovered on 15 March 1982 in Nickerie, and labelled a suicide.

On 17 March, he was cremated in Paramaribo. His twin brother Sugrim Oemrawsingh swore revenge on the perpetrators, but was arrested. Sugrim was released in October, and became one of the victims of the December murders in Fort Zeelandia on 8 December 1982.
