= Line filter =

Type of electronic filter

A line filter (a.k.a. EMC filter, EMI filter, RFI filter) is an electronic filter that is placed between the mains electricity input and internal circuitry of electronic equipment to attenuate conducted radio frequencies radio frequency interference (RFI), also known as electromagnetic interference (EMI). Often it is either integrated into the power entry module or as a separate module (similar to the photo).

== Types of line filters ==
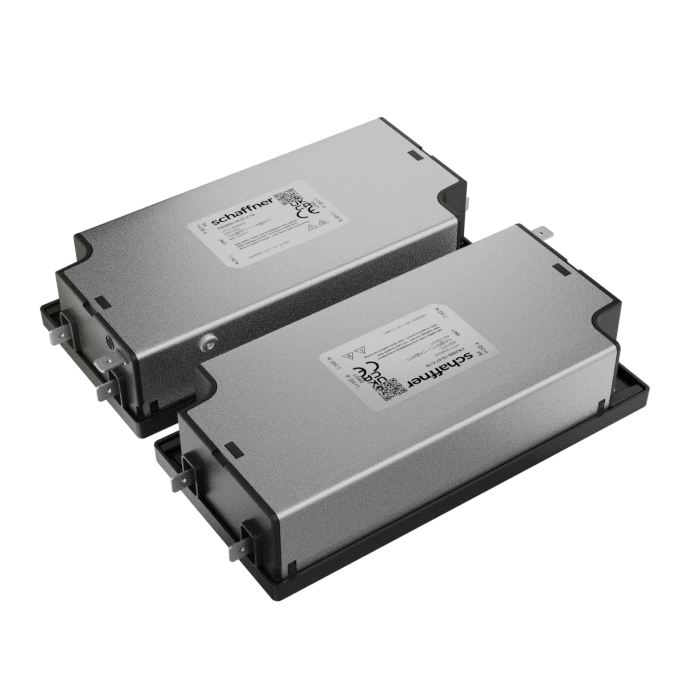
1 phase EMC filter

- A line filter may be incorporated in a connector. For example:
  - An AC line filter may be incorporated in a modular IEC 60320 power inlet connector or power entry module.
  - A telephone line filter may be incorporated in a modular RJ11 connector.
- A line filter may be mounted on a PCB.
- An AC line filter may be a stand-alone device, chassis mounted inside the equipment.
- A facility AC line filter is mounted inside a room or cabinet, at the point where the AC power comes in.
- For DC grids, photovoltaic applications and EV charging applications, DC filters are used.
- AC line filters are very commonly used with inverters (a.k.a. drives, frequency converters). The switching semiconductors in the inverters cause energetic noise in high frequencies, that can cause EMI.

== Characteristics of line filters ==
- A line filter may be used to attenuate EMI in either direction. For example:
  - Emissions: It may be used to reduce the unintentional conducted emission from the equipment, to a level sufficiently low to pass regulatory limits (such as FCC part 15). For example, in switching power supplies.
  - Immunity: It may be used to reduce the level of EMI entering the equipment, to a level sufficiently low not to cause any undesired behavior. For example, in equipment used in Radio Transmitter facilities
- The attenuation of line filters is measured in two areas:
  - Common mode - attenuation to signals that appear identically on each of the wires going through the filter.
  - Differential mode - attenuation to signals that appear on just one of the lines.
- For each Mode, the attenuation is characterized over the frequency spectrum, and measured in dB.
- AC line filters typically comply to IEC 60939 - Passive filter units for electromagnetic interference suppression

== See also ==
- AC-line filter capacitor
