= Surendre Rambocus =

Surinamese serviceman

- Surendre Rambocus (1982)
- Born: Surendre Sradhanand Rambocus; 5 May 1953; Nickerie, Suriname
- Died: 8 December 1982 (aged 29); Paramaribo, Suriname
- Education: Royal Military Academy
- Occupation: Military officer

Surendre Sradhanand Rambocus (5 May 1953 – 8 December 1982) was a Surinamese serviceman. For a short period, he was the highest-ranking officer of the Suriname National Army. He was involved in the unsuccessful coup d'état of March 1982 against the then dictator of Suriname, Dési Bouterse, and was executed on 8 December 1982 as one of the December murders.

== Biography ==
Rambocus was born on 5 May 1953 in the Nickerie District. He attended the Royal Military Academy in Breda, Netherlands and graduated in 1978 on a thesis about coup d'états. He then became a second lieutenant in the Suriname National Army.

== Background ==
The Netherlands granted Suriname independence on 25 November 1975. The hastily created army had many non-commissioned officers, but very few officers. The army was commanded by Yngwe Elstak who demanded discipline and was adamant that there was no promotion without graduating from the military academy. The NCOs tried to form a union, demanded better pay and opportunities of promotion. Prime Minister Henck Arron refused to recognise them and arrested the ringleaders, who were to go to trial on 26 February 1980.

== 1980 coup d'état ==
On 25 February 1980, 16 non-commissioned officers of the army deposed the government, and set up a military dictatorship, led by sergeant Desi Bouterse. Rambocus was not a member of the coup plotters, however he was sympathetic to their cause, and the subject had been discussed privately. In an interview with Jozef Slagveer after the coup, Bouterse revealed that he did not trust Rambocus. Nevertheless, Rambocus and Jeff Wirht were the only officers who accepted the new regime. Rambocus was appointed by the military authority as highest-ranking officer of the Suriname National Army, and was ordered to maintain discipline in the army.

Rambocus became more and more critical of the regime. Rambocus was of the opinion that soldiers do not belong in the centre of power. He was dismissed by the National Military Council, and later arrested three times. In December 1980, he was released by André Haakmat, the Minister of Justice, because he had been jailed without charge. He then left for the Netherlands, and became a law student at the University of Utrecht. According his brother, he returned to Suriname in May 1981 without providing any specifics.

== Rambocus coup d'état ==
On the night of 10 to 11 March 1982, Rambocus freed Sergeant Major Wilfred Hawker from jail. Together they committed a counter-coup, and took control of the Memre Boekoe barracks. They called themselves the National Liberation Council. The plan was to attack Fort Zeelandia, the headquarters of Bouterse, with a tank, however Lachman, a member of the council, defected to Bouterse with the tank, and the conspirators were arrested.

Hawker was executed by firing squad which was broadcast on television. Baal Oemrawsingh, professor and former member of parliament, was considered the brains behind the coup. His dead body was discovered on 15 March 1982, and labelled a suicide. Paul Somohardjo was arrested, but received permission to visit the funeral of his grandmother. He used the opportunity to escape to the Netherlands.

Rambocus and his subordinate Jiwansingh Sheombar were imprisoned in Fort Zeelandia. A trial followed, in which the lawyers John Baboeram, Eddy Hoost, and Harold Riedewald argued that the counter-coup from Rambocus could not be unlawful, because the Bouterse regime itself had come to power in a non-legitimate way. The court nevertheless sentenced Rambocus to twelve years in prison.

== December murders ==
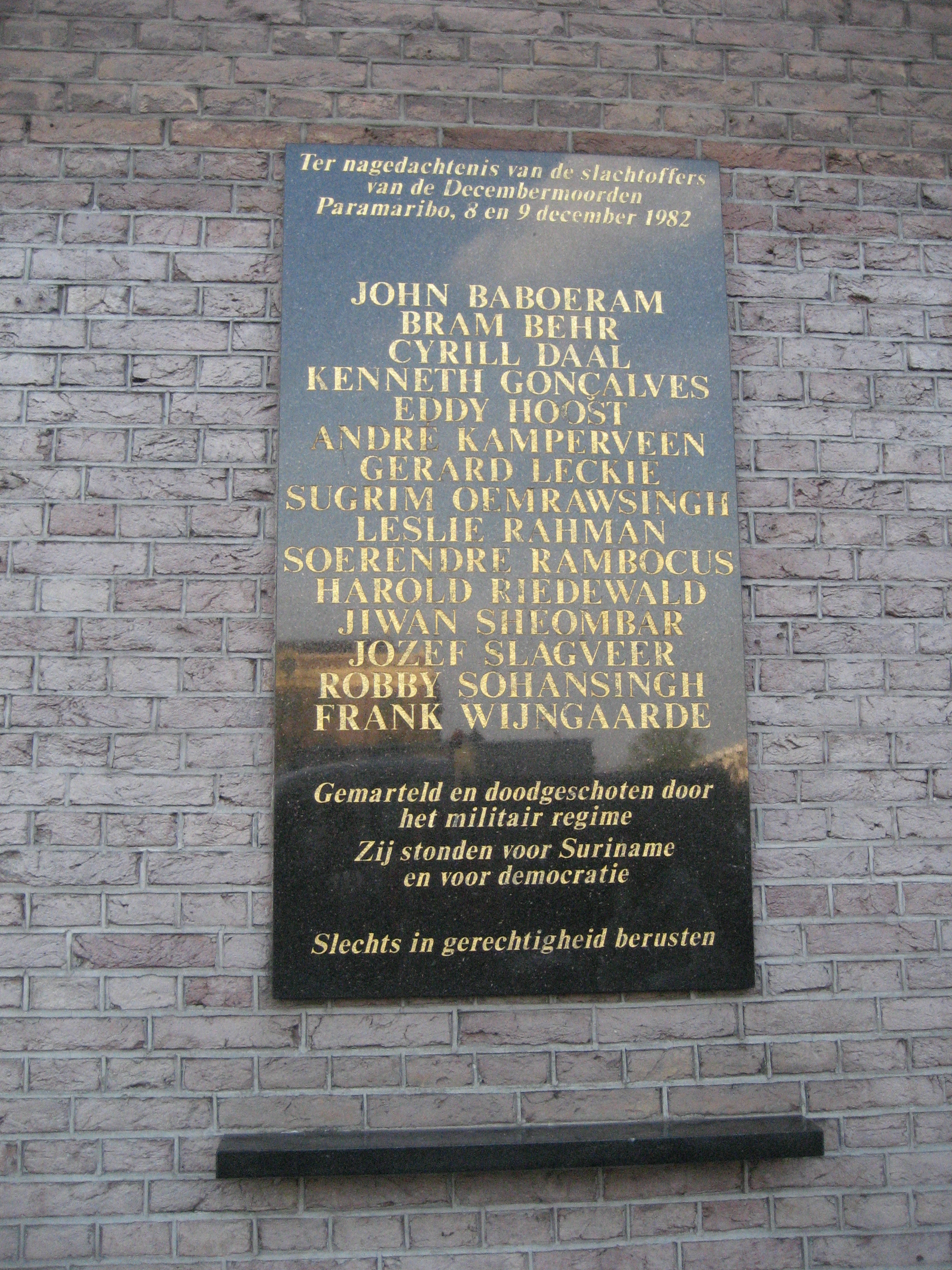
Suriname 1982 monument

On the night of 7 to 8 December 1982, various people were captured by the soldiers of Bouterse and taken to Fort Zeelandia, among them the lawyers Baboeram, Gonçalves, Hoost, and Riedewald. Rambocus was also taken from his cell in the Memre Boekoe barracks and transferred to Fort Zeelandia. There, Rambocus called Bouterse to account for his actions, in the presence of almost all the original perpetrators of the Sergeants' coup, and challenged Bouterse to a duel with Uzis, so they could fight it out without innocent casualties. However, he was sentenced to death, and on 8 December, Rambocus and 14 others at Fort Zeelandia were tortured and later killed.

On 23 March 2012, Ruben Rozendaal, also suspect in the trial of the December murders, declared under oath to the court martial that Bouterse had personally killed Rambocus and Cyrill Daal at the time. Jan Sariman, the former minister of agriculture confirmed the story in his book De Decembermoorden in Suriname (1983). According to the report of the International Commission of Jurists, his face was swollen and he was riddled with bullets.

Surendre Rambocus was the brother of, among others, the Dutch politician Nirmala Rambocus.
