= Maarten van der Graaff =

Dutch poet (born 1987)

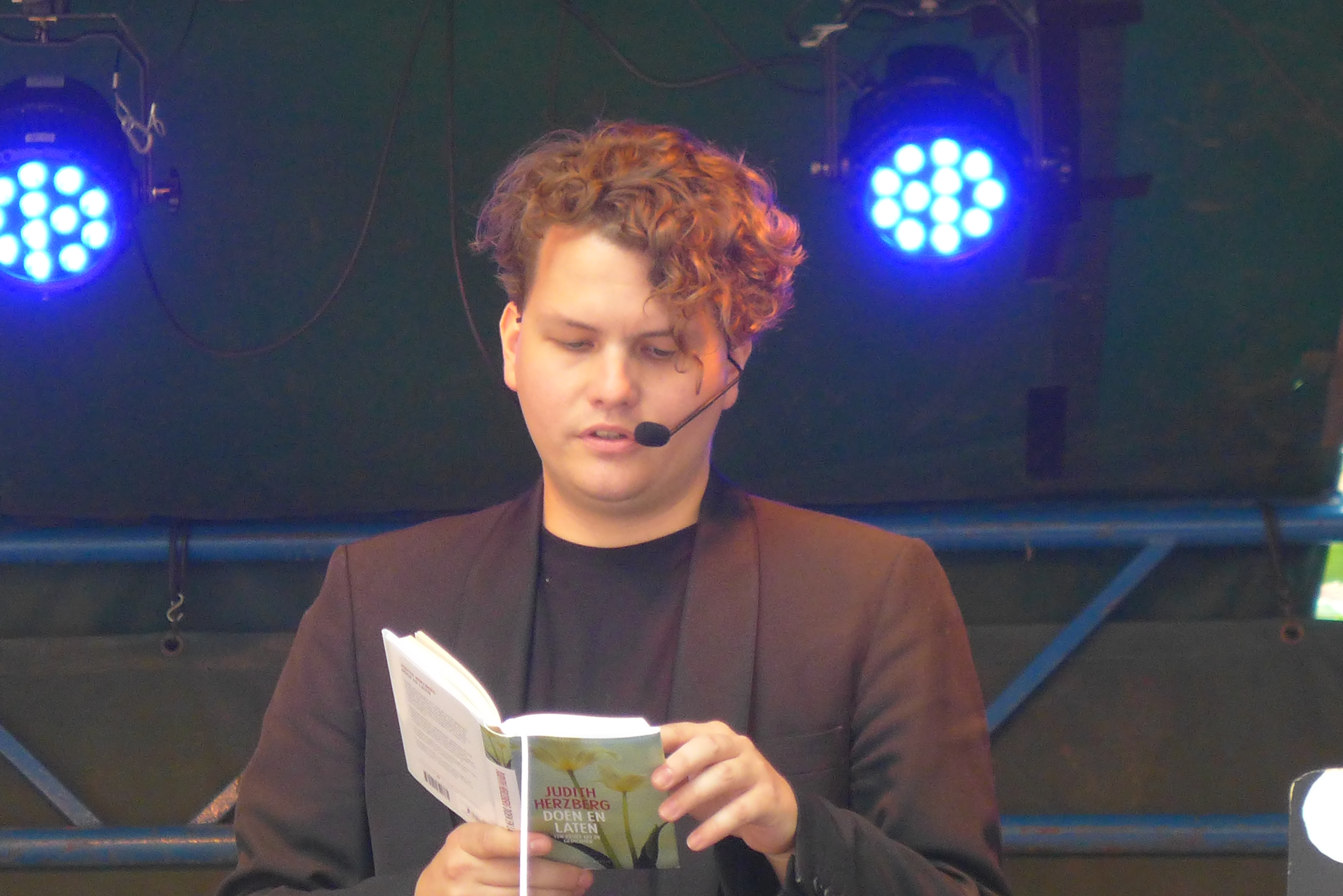
- Maarten van der Graaff (2016)
- Born: 14 October 1987 (age 38); Dirksland, Netherlands
- Occupation: Poet

Maarten van der Graaff (born 14 October 1987) is a Dutch poet.

== Career ==
Van der Graaff made his debut with Vluchtautogedichten (2013). He won the C. Buddingh'-prijs in 2014 for this debut. He received the J.C. Bloem-poëzieprijs for his second poetry collection Dood Werk (2015).

In 2017, he made his debut as novelist with the novel Wormen en engelen. He won the Prijs voor het Religieuze Boek in 2018 for this book. The book was also nominated for the Anton Wachterprijs that year.

His works have been published by Atlas Contact.

== Awards ==
- 2014: C. Buddingh'-prijs, Vluchtautogedichten
- 2017: J.C. Bloem-poëzieprijs, Dood Werk
- 2018: Prijs voor het Religieuze Boek, Wormen en engelen

== Publications ==
- 2013: Vluchtautogedichten (poetry)
- 2015: Dood Werk (poetry)
- 2017: Wormen en engelen (novel)
- 2020: Nederland in stukken (poetry)
- 2022: Onder asfalt (novel)
- 2025: Huishoudboekje van de verborgen dingen (poetry)
