= Delphine Lecompte =

Flemish poet (born 1978)

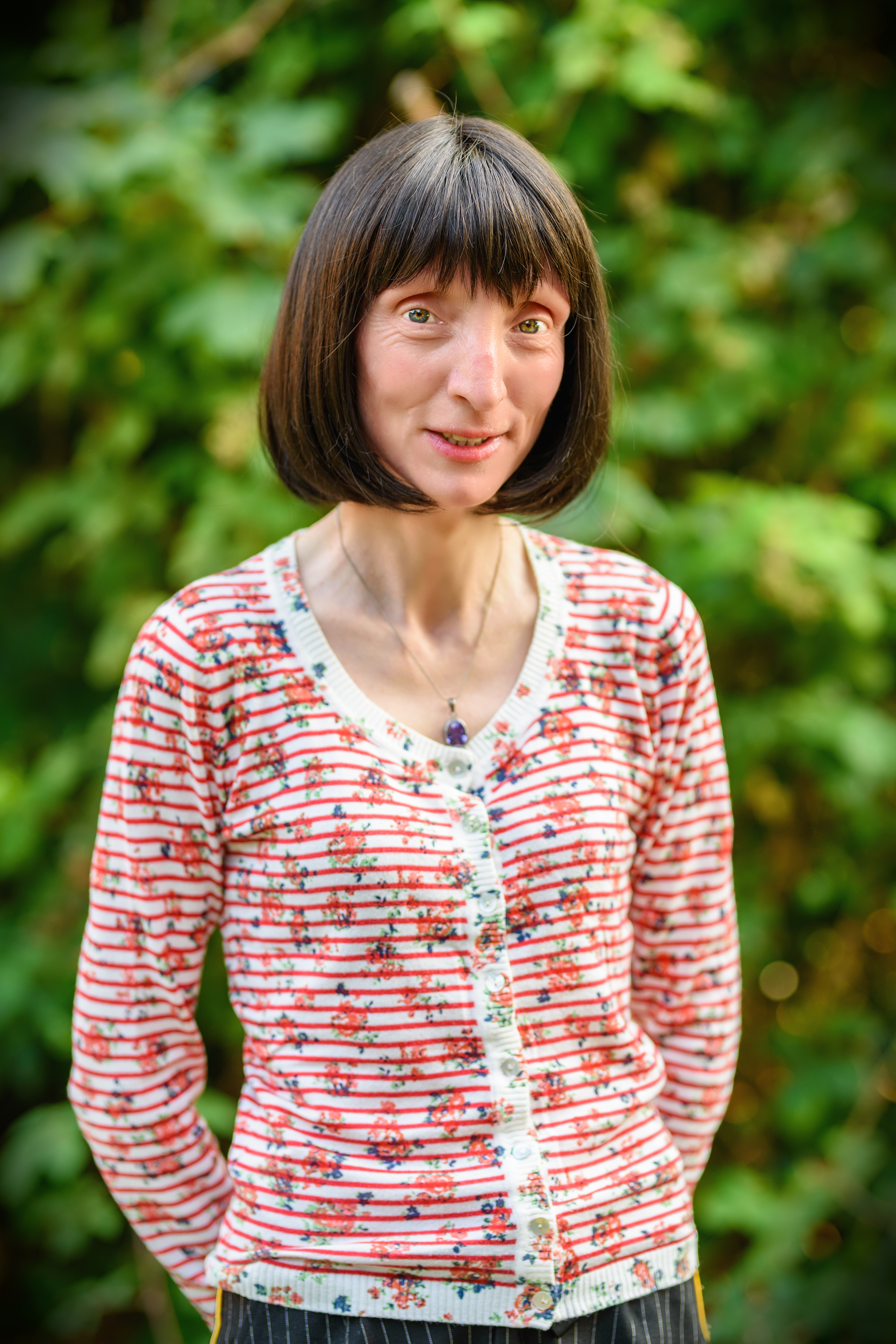
- Lecompte in 2022
- Born: 22 January 1978 (age 48); Ghent, Belgium
- Occupation: Poet
- Writing career
- Notable work: letter to Humo
- Notable awards: C. Buddingh'-prijs (2010), Prijs voor Letterkunde van de Provincie West-Vlaanderen (2011)

Delphine Lecompte (born 22 January 1978) is a Flemish poet and columnist.

== Career ==
In 2010, she won the C. Buddingh'-prijs for her debut poetry collection De dieren in mij.

She also received the Prijs voor Letterkunde van de Provincie West-Vlaanderen in 2011 for this debut.

In 2021, she wrote a letter to Humo magazine in which she made several controversial comments regarding pedophilia. Her letter was condemned by Flemish ministers including Matthias Diependaele and Sammy Mahdi. The city of Bruges, which employs her as the official poet of a museum, did not endorse her views but recognised her right to free speech.

== Publications ==
- 2009: De dieren in mij
- 2010: Verzonnen prooi
- 2012: Blinde gedichten
- 2013: Schachten en amuletten
- 2014: De baldadige walvis
- 2015: Dichter, bokser, koningsdochter
- 2017: Western
- 2019: Vrolijke verwoesting
- 2021: Beschermvrouwe van de verschoppelingen

== Awards ==
- 2010: C. Buddingh'-prijs, De dieren in mij
- 2011: Prijs voor Letterkunde van de Provincie West-Vlaanderen, De dieren in mij
