= Paul Marijnis =

Dutch writer and poet

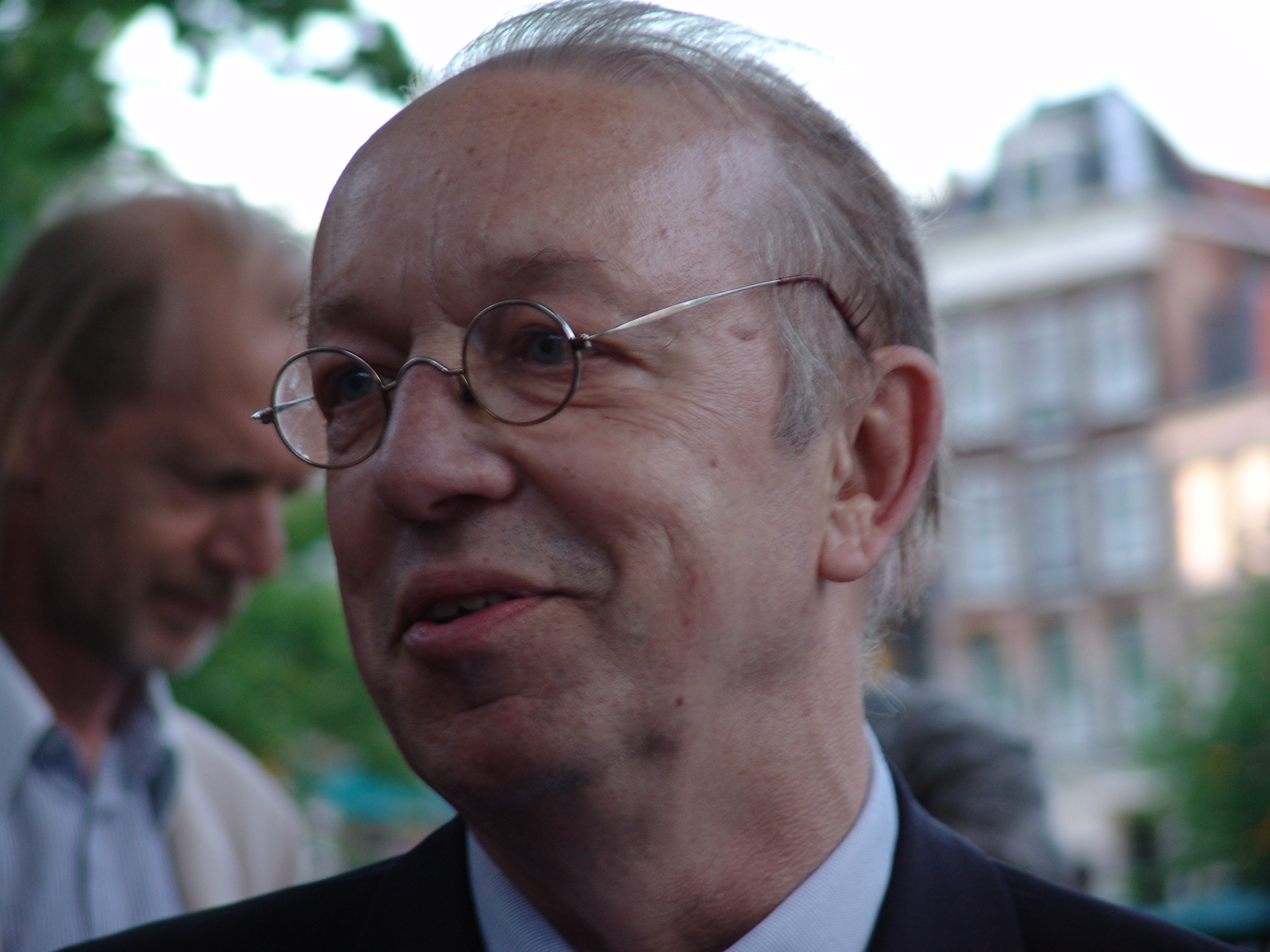
- Paul Marijnis in 2005
- Born: 9 September 1946; Schiedam, Netherlands
- Died: 10 April 2008 (aged 61); Leiden, Netherlands
- Occupations: Writer, poet
- Writing career
- Years active: 1993 – 2008
- Notable awards: J.C. Bloem-poëzieprijs; 2003

Paul Marijnis (9 September 1946 – 10 April 2008) was a Dutch writer and poet.

== Career ==
Marijnis worked as a journalist at NRC Handelsblad.

Marijnis made his literary debut in 1993 at age 47 with the novel De zeemeermin published by De Arbeiderspers. In an interview in 1993 Marijnis mentioned Paul van Ostaijen, J. Slauerhoff and Lucebert as sources of inspiration. Marijnis made his debut as poet with Gillette (1998) which was nominated for the C. Buddingh'-prijs award in 1999. His second poetry collection Roze zoenen (2002) won the very first J.C. Bloem-poëzieprijs in 2003.

== Death ==
Marijnis died in 2008 after a stroke. His last novel Waandag was published posthumously in 2009.

== Publications ==
- De zeemeermin (1993)
- Gillette (1998)
- Roze zoenen (2002)
- Het licht in de kattenbak (2003)
- De loden schoentjes (2006)
- Waandag (2009)
- cumdag (2022)
