= André Verbart =

Dutch poet (born 1960)

- Born: Andreas Franciscus Maria Verbart; 23 January 1960 (age 66) 's-Heerenhoek
- Occupation: Poet

André Verbart (born 23 January 1960) is a Dutch poet.

== Early life ==
Verbart was born in 1960 in 's-Heerenhoek. In 1995, he was promoted to doctor for his study of the epic poem Paradise Lost by the 17th-century English poet John Milton. The results of his study were published as Fellowship in Paradise Lost.

== Career ==
Verbart made his debut as poet with poetry collection 98 in 1999. In 2000 he won the C. Buddingh'-prijs for this debut.

== Awards ==
- 2000: C. Buddingh'-prijs

== Publications ==
- Fellowship in Paradise Lost (1995)
- 98 (1999)
