= Gerry van der Linden =

Dutch poet and writer (born 1952)

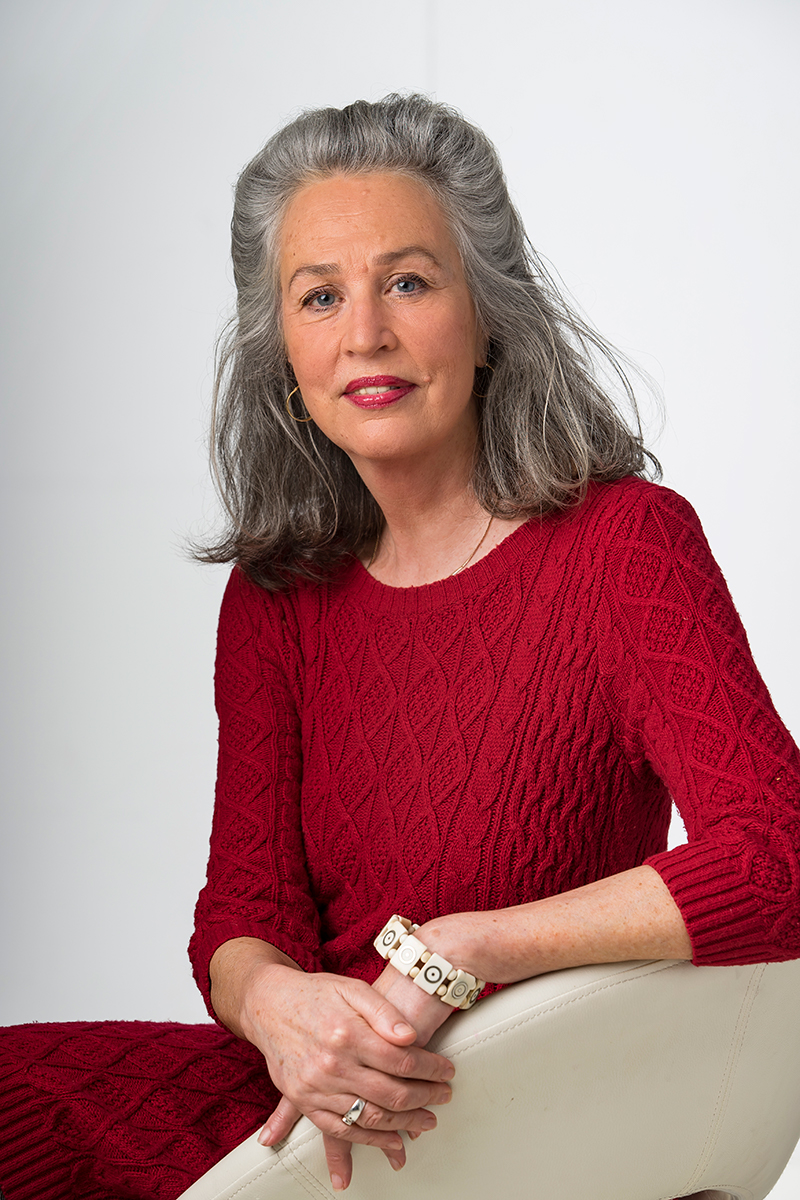
Photo: Patrick Siemons

Gertrude Maria Johanna Catharina "Gerry" van der Linden (born 25 November 1952) is a Dutch writer.

She was born in Eindhoven. Van der Linden published her first collection of poetry De Aantekening (The Note) in 1978. She moved to the United States in 1979, living in New York City and San Francisco for the next four years. After returning to the Netherlands, she published her second book of poetry Val op de rand (Fall on the Edge) in 1990.

Van der Linden teaches poetry and creative writing at the Amsterdam School of Writing. She served on the board for the PEN Center in the Netherlands. Her poems have appeared in translation in various anthologies and publications in Bulgaria, England, France, Germany, Indonesia, Macedonia and Slovenia.

== Selected works ==
- Enveloppen (Envelop), novella (1992)
- Aan mijn veren hand (At my Hand of Feathers), poetry (1993)
- Wind, novel (1995)
- Zandloper (Sandglass), poetry (1997)
- Dolk (Dagger), novel (2000)
- Uitweg (Way Out), poetry (2001)
- Goed volk (Good People), poetry (2004)
- Glazen Jas (Coat of Glass) (2007)
