= J.C. Bloem-poëzieprijs =

Dutch literary award

- Awarded for: Poet's second poetry publication in Dutch language
- Country: Netherlands
- First award: 2001

The J.C. Bloem-poëzieprijs (Dutch for J.C. Bloem Poetry Prize) is a biennial Dutch literary award. The award is named after Dutch poet and essayist J. C. Bloem and is awarded to a Dutch or Flemisch poet's second collection of poems. The award was created in 2001 and first awarded in 2003.

Saskia Stuiveling was head of the jury of the J.C. Bloem-poëzieprijs until her death in 2017. As of 2018 Roger van Boxtel is head of the jury.

== Winners ==
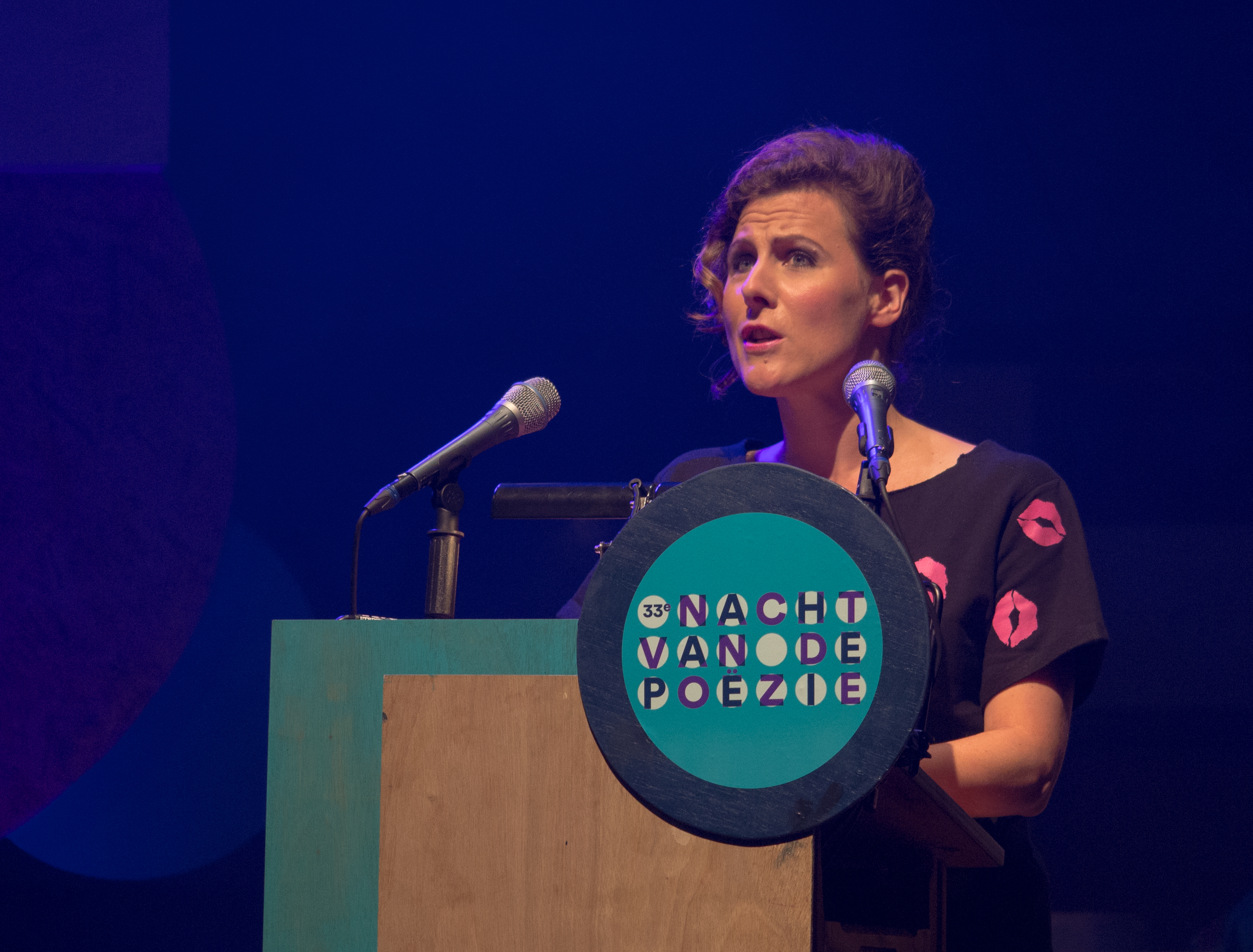
Ester Naomi Perquin (awarded in 2011)

- 2003 - Paul Marijnis, Roze zoenen
- 2005 - Hagar Peeters, Koffers zeelucht
- 2007 - Hanz Mirck, Wegsleepregeling van kracht
- 2009 - Maria Barnas, Er staat een stad op
- 2011 - Ester Naomi Perquin, Namens de ander
- 2013 - Mischa Andriessen, Huisverraad
- 2015 - Els Moors, Liederen van een kapseizend paard
- 2017 - Maarten van der Graaff, Dood Werk
- 2019 - Jonathan Griffioen, Gedichten met een Mazda 626
- 2021 - Moya de Feyter, Massastrandingen
