= C. Buddingh'-prijs =

Dutch literary award

- Awarded for: Best debut poetry collection
- Country: Netherlands
- Reward: €1,250
- First award: 1988
- Website: https://www.poetryinternationalweb.net/pi/site/activity/info/29544/C-Buddingh-Prijs-Juryreglement

The C. Buddingh'-prijs (Dutch for C. Buddingh' Prize) is an annual literary award for the best debut poetry collection in Dutch. The award is given by Poetry International and is named after Dutch poet C. Buddingh'. The award was first given in 1988 and the award is given during the Poetry International Festival in Rotterdam. As of 2022, the winner of the prize receives €1,250.

== Winners ==
- 1988: Elma van Haren, Reis naar het welkom geheten
- 1989: Not awarded
- 1990: Tonnus Oosterhoff, Boerentijger
- 1991: Michaël Zeeman, Beeldenstorm
- 1992: Anna Enquist, Soldatenliederen
- 1993: Herman Leenders, Ogentroost
- 1994: F. van Dixhoorn, Jaagpad
- 1995: Joke van Leeuwen, Laatste lezers
- 1996: Henk van der Waal, De windsels van de sfinx
- 1997: Pem Sluijter, Roos is een bloem
- 1998: Erik Menkveld, De karpersimulator
- 1999: Ilja Leonard Pfeijffer, Van de vierkante man
- 2000: André Verbart, 98
- 2001: Mark Boog, Alsof er iets gebeurt
- 2002: Erwin Mortier, Vergeten licht
- 2003: Jane Leusink, Mos en gladde paadjes
- 2004: Maria Barnas, Twee zonnen
- 2005: Liesbeth Lagemaat, Een grimwoud in mijn keel
- 2006: Willem Thies, Toendra
- 2007: Bernard Wesseling, Focus
- 2008: Wiljan van den Akker, De afstand
- 2009: Mischa Andriessen, Uitzien met D
- 2010: Delphine Lecompte, De dieren in mij
- 2011: Lieke Marsman, Wat ik mijzelf graag voorhoud
- 2012: Ellen Deckwitz, De steen vreest mij
- 2013: Henk Ester, Bijgeluiden
- 2014: Maarten van der Graaff, Vluchtautogedichten
- 2015: Saskia Stehouwer, Wachtkamers
- 2016: Marieke Lucas Rijneveld, Kalfsvlies
- 2017: Vicky Francken, Röntgenfotomodel
- 2018: Radna Fabias, Habitus
- 2019: Roberta Petzoldt, Vruchtwatervuurlinie
- 2020: Jens Meijen, Xenomorf
- 2021: Wout Waanders, Parkplan
- 2022: Maxime Garcia Diaz, Het is warm in de hivemind
- 2023: Alara Adilow, Mythen en stoplichten
