= Charles Beltjens =

Dutch poet

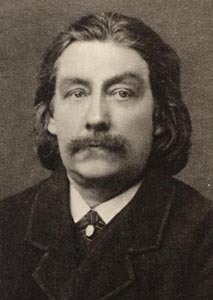
Charles Beltjens

Karel Michel Hubert (Charles) Beltjens (2 May 1832 – 20 June 1890) was a Dutch poet of the 19th century, who wrote exclusively in French.

He was born in Sittard on 2 May 1832. His father came from Roermond and his mother's family came from French-speaking Wallonia; she was the daughter of a goldsmith from Liège. Beltjens studied at the Bisschoppelijk College Sittard (1842-1843) and then in Rolduc (1845). He wrote in the French language. Beltjens also lived in France for a large part of his life. He won important literature prizes in Belgium and France, but was hardly read in the Netherlands. He had contacts with famous French writers and poets such as Charles Baudelaire and Stéphane Mallarmé. Beltjens also corresponded with the prominent French writer Victor Hugo. In 1872 he returned to Sittard where he died in solitude in 1890.

In 1987 the Charles Beltjens Foundation (Dutch: Stichting Charles Beltjens) was established in Sittard. This marked the beginning of the rehabilitation of this poet in his native city. In the Sittard district of Kollenberg there is a street named after him. There is also a French garden in the center of Sittard, "Le jardin d'Isabelle", named after Beltjen's unreachable love Isabelle de Borman. In this garden is a bronze bust of the Sittard poet.
