= Wilfred Hawker =

- Born: 1955; Suriname
- Died: 13 March 1982 (aged 26); Paramaribo, Suriname
- Cause of death: Execution by firing squad
- Occupation: Military officer

Wilfred Hawker (1955 – 13 March 1982) was a sergeant-major in the Surinamese military who was involved in two unsuccessful coups d'état in the early 1980s. Hawker was executed by the ruling military government for his role in the plots. He was the last person to be legally executed by Suriname.

== Events ==
In February 1980, Dési Bouterse gained control of Suriname after staging a successful military coup, which he led with fifteen other sergeants. Hawker was a member of the group of sixteen who overthrew the elected government. In August, Bouterse dissolved parliament and declared a state of emergency.

Hawker disagreed with these actions and he led a right-wing-inspired uprising against Bouterse's régime, which began on 15 March 1981. However, one of Hawker's trusted men leaked the plan and reported the plan to Suriname's Military Intelligence. After the plans were leaked, Hawker and his conspirators were pursued by the military, until Hawker ended up falling into a trap set by the military. Hawker due to being seriously injured, was taken to the hospital. As a result of the uprising, 1 soldier was killed and 3 people linked to the coup were arrested, Hawker himself was arrested some time later after recovering from his injuries.

On 11 March 1982, Hawker escaped from prison in the midst of another failed coup, this one led by Surendre Rambocus. Hawker was injured the next day and was taken to a military hospital. Bouterse's soldiers arrested Hawker in the hospital and took him by stretcher to Fort Zeelandia. There he was summarily tried and condemned to death for treason. Hawker was executed by firing squad, which was shown on a Surinamese television broadcast.

In November 2007, Surinamese military judge Dhanoesdharie Nankoesing was pressured to resign after the Dutch periodical Obsession published a photograph of Nankoesing holding a rifle and speaking with Hawker on the stretcher in March 1982 at Fort Zeelandia. Nankoesing denied any involvement in Hawker's trial or executions. He said that he was a Surinamese soldier who carried a weapon as others did.
