= Power entry module =

Electromechanical component in appliances

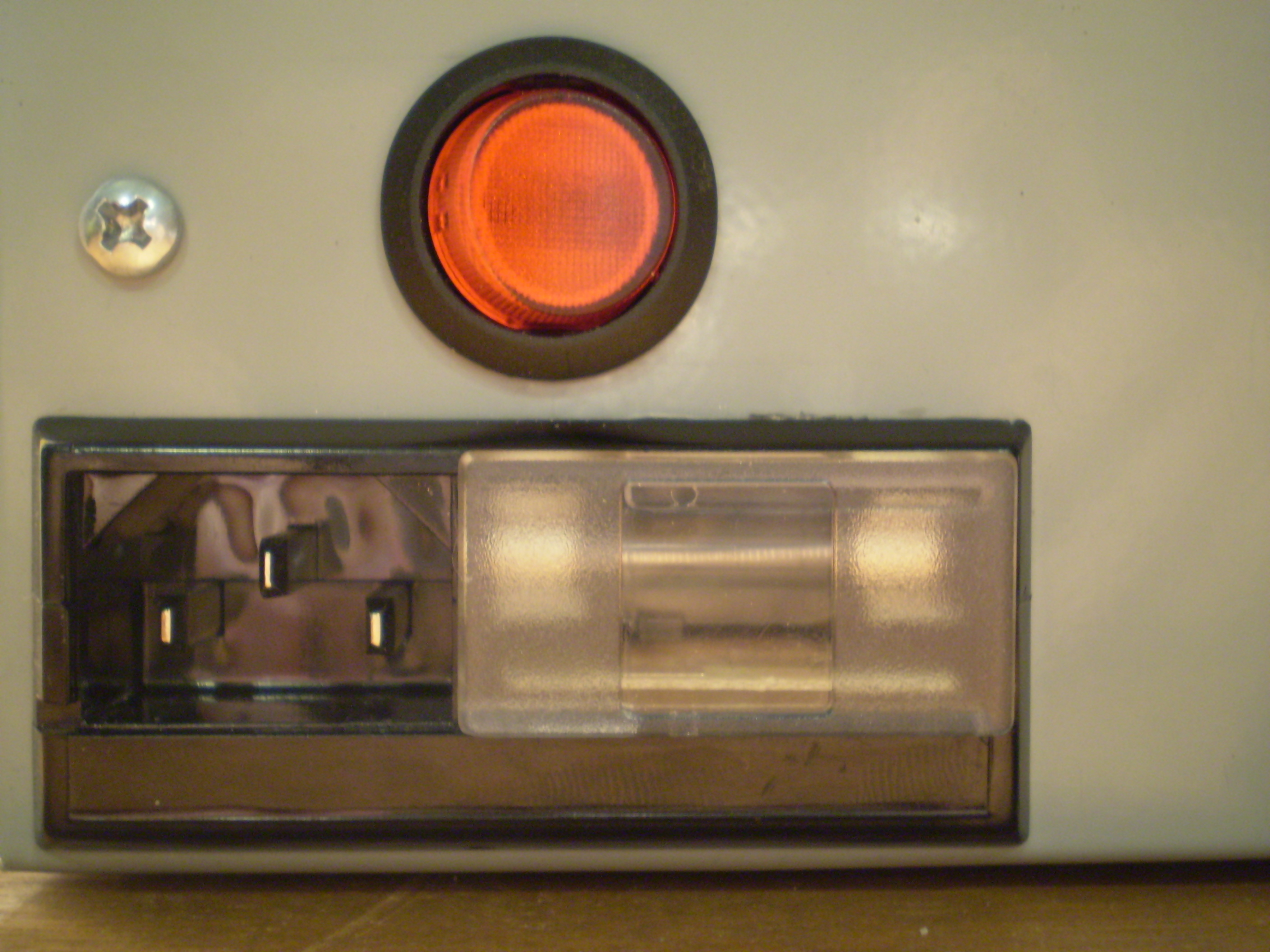
A simple power entry module, the rectangular device below a red power switch in the photograph. This example consists of an IEC 60320 C14 inlet connector and fuse holder. The fuse is protected by a sliding plastic cover, which requires the power lead to be removed before it can be opened.

A power entry module (PEM) is an electromechanical component used in electrical appliances, integrating the appliance inlet with other components such as:

- a switch, possibly including integrated or remote bowden cable actuation;
- a circuit breaker, possibly including overload, overcurrent, or undercurrent protection, as well as remote triggering;
- an appliance fuse holder;
- a voltage selector;
- an electromagnetic interference line filter;
- an appliance outlet.

Advantages of a power entry module over individual components:

- compact dimensions;
- unitized, standardized product with pre-assembled individual components;
- efficient mounting;
- alternative designs with similar dimensions may be substituted without major re-engineering;
- protected, pre-wired, tested, and certified power components.

Power entry modules are used to save labor in manufacturing electrical and electronic equipment powered by an external source, such as the AC powerline. They are also quite compact, taking up a small amount of space on the equipment’s chassis, or printed circuit board.

Power entry modules frequently allow connections to the equipment circuitry using quick connect tab terminals, also known as blade connectors. An AC inlet connector allows use of a separate, detachable AC line cord that has the type of wall plug favored by the locality. IEC 60320 AC inlet connectors typically used can handle either 120 or 250 volts.

Since most power entry modules connect to the AC powerline, they are subject to safety standards set by Underwriters Laboratories (UL), the Canadian Standards Association (CSA), Verband der Elektrotechnik, Elektronik und Informationstechnik (VDE), and many other safety standards agencies such as the BSI Group (BSI). Power entry module manufacturers take on the responsibility of producing power entry module products in such a way that they meet the standards of one or more of these safety standard agencies, so that equipment manufacturers using them need not take responsibility for the internal details of safety certification. Power entry module manufacturers also pay independent testing labs to test their products against the safety standards, so that the products can carry the safety agency’s approval mark.

Typical AC power entry modules often have dielectric strengths of 2000 volts or more, and can handle currents of up to 10 to 20 amperes at 250 volts maximum. Exceeding the ratings can cause unsafe operation and must be avoided.

Medical devices can and do take advantage of power entry modules. Power entry modules are available with electromagnetic interference filters with very low leakage current ratings, even those suitable for direct patient contact in accordance with UL 544 and IEC 60601-1. Shock-safe fuseholders have also been integrated into power entry modules. These devices require a tool to remove the fuse for replacement.

DC (Direct current) power entry modules have been less common, but are finding popularity with equipment manufacturers, especially those that supply equipment in both AC- and DC-powered versions. The DC-powered versions of such equipment are frequently used in telephone exchange applications.

Power entry modules are also available rated as water resistant at IP65, with seal protection at the panel opening, around the fuse holders when provided, and between the inlet housing and connector pins.

== See also ==
- AC power plugs and sockets
