= Hugo Pos =

Dutch-Surinamese poet

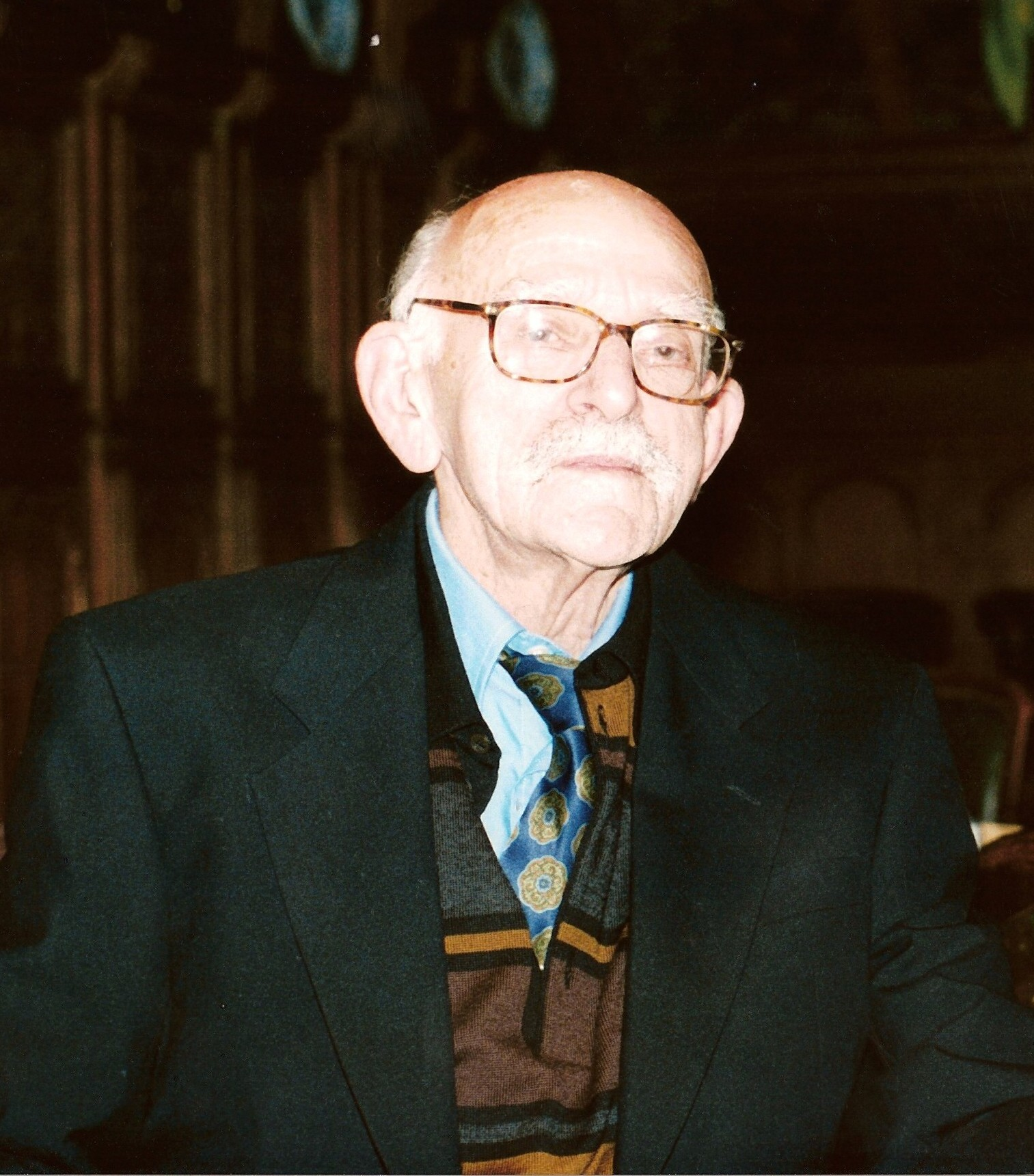
- Hugo Pos in 1998
- Born: 28 November 1913; Paramaribo, Suriname
- Died: 11 November 2000 (aged 86); Amsterdam, Netherlands
- Occupations: Judge, writer, and poet

Hugo Pos (November 28, 1913 in Paramaribo – November 11, 2000 in Amsterdam) was a Surinamese judge, writer, and poet.

== Biography ==
Hugo Pos was born in Paramaribo. Raymond was his older brother. In 1925, he left Suriname for the Netherlands to study at the grammar school and later Leiden University, and continued his studies in Paris. In 1940, Germany invaded the Netherlands, and because Pos was Jewish, he tried to escape. His second attempt was successful and Pos managed to reach California via Finland, Russia and Japan. He then decided to go to the United Kingdom to enlist in the army. In 1944, Pos joined the Netherlands Indies Civil Administration, and prosecuted "minor war crimes" for the International Military Tribunal for the Far East in Japan. Pos was back in the Netherlands in 1948, however he decided to return to his native country of Suriname in 1950 where he was appointed as judge and attorney general. Pos also taught at the Law School in Paramaribo. Eddy Hoost, the first Minister of Justice of an independent Suriname, asked Pos to return to Suriname to head the Constitutional Court of Suriname. Pos accepted the offer, however the court was not established until 4 October 2019. Pos started to publish under his own name after his retirement .

== Writer and Poet ==
He wrote poems under the pseudonym "Ernesto Albin" in the magazine Soela (1963-1964) and a number of plays, including the self-directed Vive la Vida (1957) and radio play Black and White. He published several collections of quatrains, which were later collected in Een uitroep zonder uitroepteken' ("an exclamation without exclamation mark") (1987) and various other collections.

In his 1982 play De Tranen van Den Uyl (English: The Tears of Den Uyl), Pos writes about the December murders. Harold Riedewald, and Eddy Hoost were not just former students of Pos during the time he was teaching at the Law School in Suriname, but also personal friends. The play is about a fictitious meeting between the Surinamese reporter Jozef Slagveer and his Dutch counterpart Han de Graaf, in which the events after the independence of Suriname are discussed. (Note: Suriname was granted independence by Prime Minister Joop den Uyl on 25 November 1975.) Pos did not write the play as a drama, but as a means of remembrance. Even though he lived in diaspora, he mentally remained in his land of birth.

In his first collection of stories Het doosje van Toeti ("The box of Toeti") (1985), he looks back on his childhood years in Paramaribo and his crossing to Holland. The stories from his second collection, De ziekte van Anna Printemps ("The Disease of Anna Printemps") (1987) take place everywhere around the globe. This cosmopolitanism can also be found in the collection of essays and travel reports that appeared on the occasion of his 74th birthday, Reizen en stilstaan ("Travel and residence") (1988), in which he also reflects on the moral implications of the judgments he had to express as a representative of the colonial authority over colonized people.

== Sources ==
- Bert Peene, 'Hugo Pos'. In: Kritisch Lexicon van de Moderne Nederlandstalige Literatuur, afl. 46, augustus 1992.
- Michiel van Kempen, Surinaamse schrijvers en dichters. Amsterdam: De Arbeiderspers, 1989
- Michiel van Kempen, Een geschiedenis van de Surinaamse literatuur. Breda: De Geus, 2003, deel I, pp. 528–530, 548-549, deel II, pp. 736, 923, 1116-1124.
- Levensbericht in het Jaarboek van de Maatschappij der Nederlandse Letterkunde
