= J. C. Bloem =

Dutch poet and essayist (1887–1966)

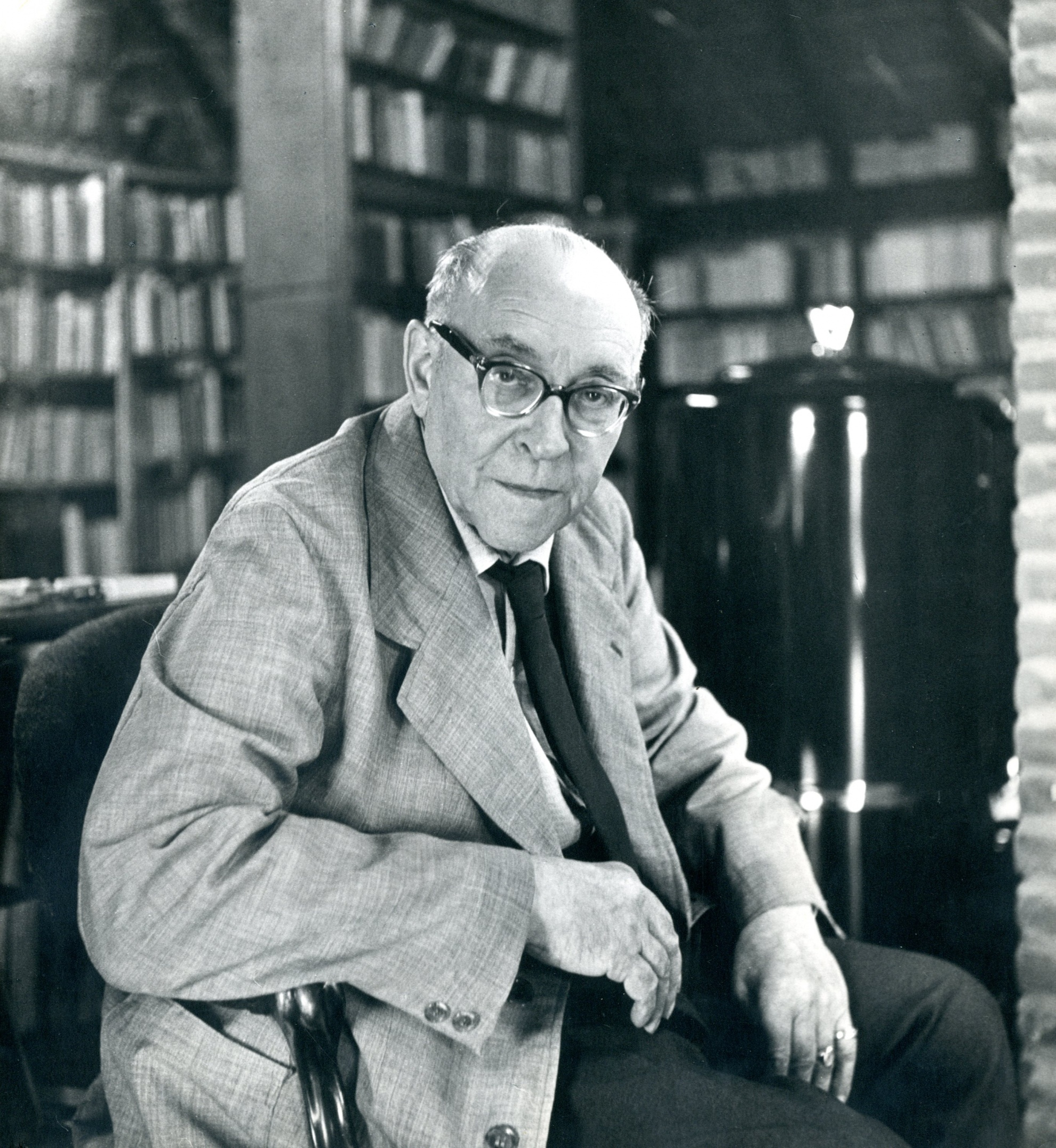
- Bloem in his study in 1933
- Born: 10 May 1887
- Died: 10 August 1966
- Genre: poetry and essay

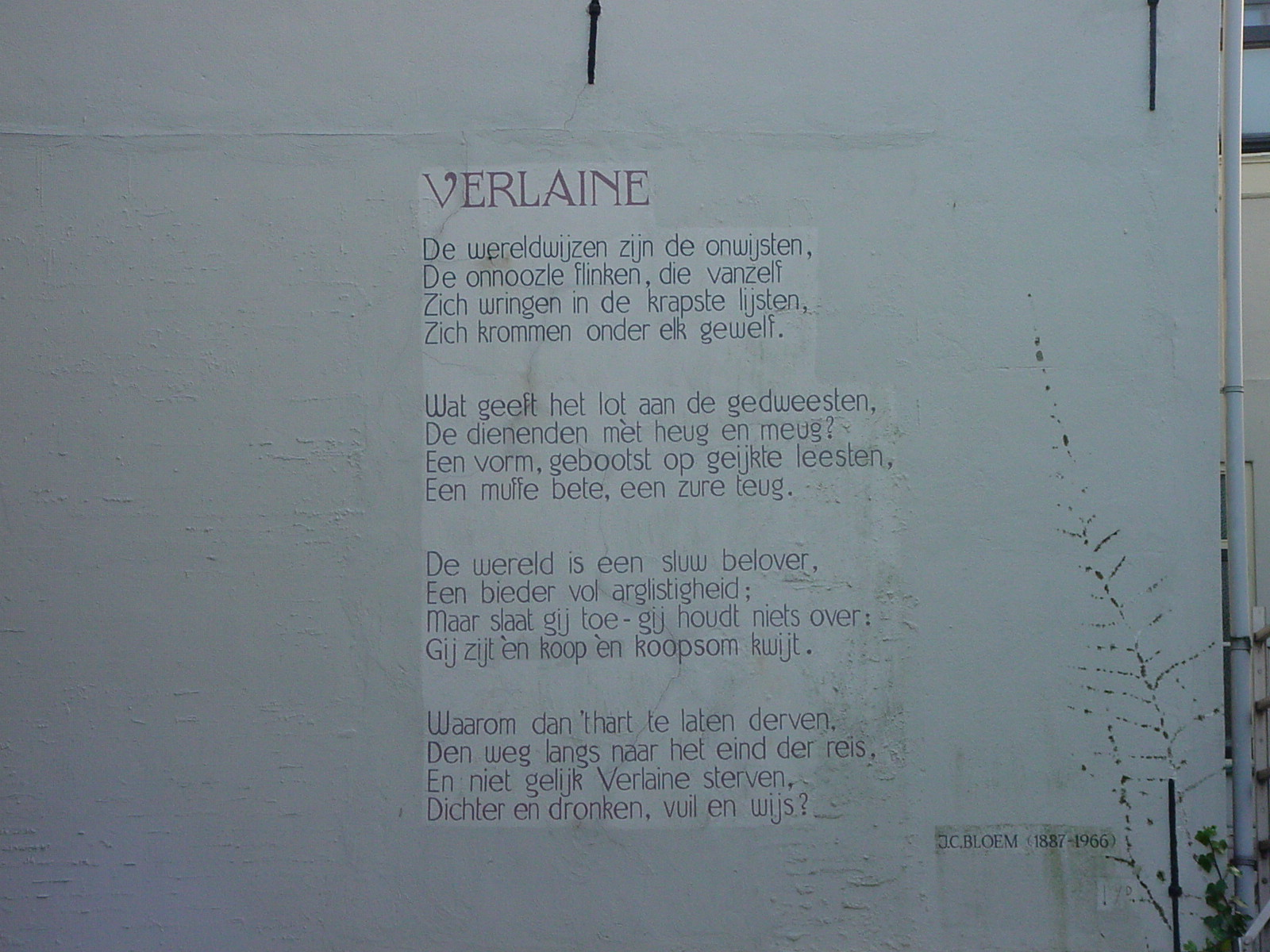
J.C. Bloem - Verlaine, a wall poem in Leiden

Jakobus Cornelis (Jacques) Bloem (10 May 1887 – 10 August 1966) was a Dutch poet and essayist. Between 1921 and 1958 he published fourteen volumes of poetry. In 1949 he won the Constantijn Huygensprijs, one of the country's highest literary awards, and in 1952 the P. C. Hooft Award for his literary oeuvre. In 1965, in rapidly declining health, he was awarded the highest Dutch-language literary award, the Prijs der Nederlandse Letteren. He was nominated for the Nobel Prize in Literature.

Dubbed the poet of unfulfilled desire, he is hailed as one of the 100 greatest Netherlanders of the twentieth century.

The Dutch poetry award J.C. Bloem-poëzieprijs is named after him.

== Life ==
In his early years, Bloem was a great admirer of the symbolist poetry of Charles Baudelaire; it is, however, for a relatively simple, almost naive poem that he is best remembered in the Netherlands, "Domweg Gelukkig in de Dapperstraat", "simply (or foolishly) happy in the Dapperstraat", a market street in East Amsterdam. The poem also lent its title to a popular anthology of Dutch poetry. His legacy, beside his poetry, remains a bit controversial: he was suspected of antisemitism and of sympathizing, at least initially, with the German Nazi government, and in a recent biography the possibility of his having been homosexual was proposed. Still, his importance to the country was reaffirmed at the fortieth anniversary of his death, a celebration of his life and work in Paasloo, where he and his wife Clara Eggink were buried.

== Select bibliography ==
- Het verlangen. 1921.
- Media vita. 1931.
- Nederlaag. 1937.
- Sintels. 1945.
- Quiet though sad: gedichten ’s-Gravenhage, A.A.M. Stols, 1946.
- Verzamelde gedichten. ’s-Gravenhage, A. A. M. Stols, 1947.
- Verzamelde Beschouwingen. ’s-Gravenhage, A.A.M. Stols, 1950.
- Afscheid. ’s-Gravenhage: L. J. C. Boucher, 1957.
- Poëtica. Amsterdam: Athenaeum/Polak & Van Gennep, 1969.
- Ongewild archief. ’s-Gravenhage: BZZTôH, 1977. ISBN 90-6291-009-2.
- Ganz einfach glücklich, in der Dapperstraat - Ausgewählte Gedichte aus dem Niederländischen übersetzt von Gerd Busse und Christian Golusda. Mauke Verlag, Jena, 2024. ISBN 978-3-948259-19-8
