= Maria Barnas =

Dutch writer, poet, artist

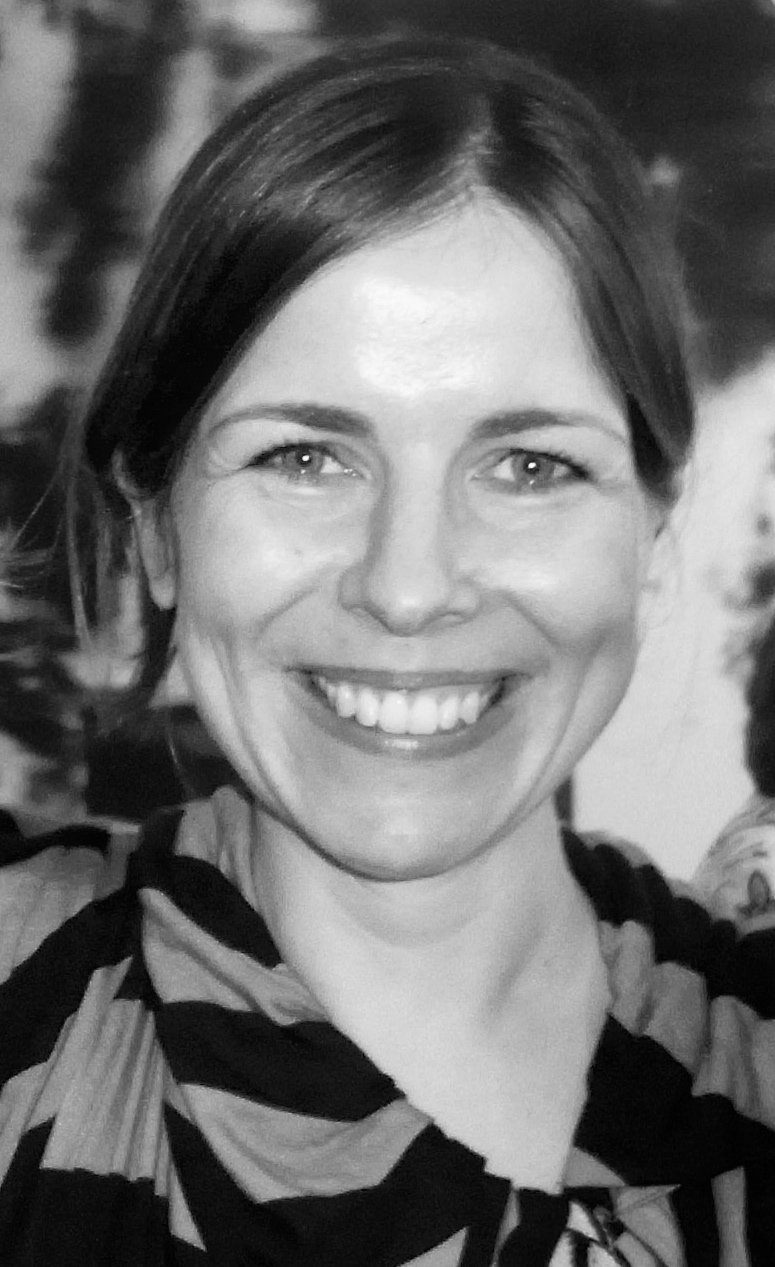
Maria Barnas, March 2012

Maria Barnas (born 28 August 1973, Hoorn) is a Dutch writer, poet and artist.

== Awards ==
- 2004 C. Buddingh'-prijs voor nieuwe Nederlandstalige poëzie' for 'Two Suns' ('Twee zonnen, 2003 De Arbeiderspers)
- 2009 J.C. Bloem-poëzieprijs for 'A City Rises' (Er staat een stad op, 2007 De Arbeiderspers)
- 2014 Nomination for VSB Poetry Prize for 'Yeah Right The Big Bang' (Jaja de oerknal, 2013 De Arbeiderspers)
- 2014 Anna Bijns Poetry Prize for Jaja de oerknal
- 2019 Nomination for VSB Poetry Prize for Jaja de oerknal

== Works ==
=== Novels ===
- Engelen van (Ice Angels) (1997)
- De baadster (The bather) (2000)
- Altijd Augustus (August Always) (2017)

=== Poetry ===
- Twee zonnen (Two Suns) (De Arbeiderspers, 2003)
- Er staat een stad op (A City Rises), De Arbeiderspers, Amsterdam 2007.
- Jaja de oerknal (Yeah right the Big Bang), De Arbeiderspers, Amsterdam 2013,
- Nachtboot (Night Boat), Van Oorschot, 2018, nominated for the VSB Poetry Prize 2019

=== Essays ===
- Fantastisch (On Fantasy), De Arbeiderspers, 2010, collected news paper articles for NRC Handelsblad
