= Memre Boekoe barracks =

Barrack in Paramaribo, Suriname

- Paramaribo, Suriname
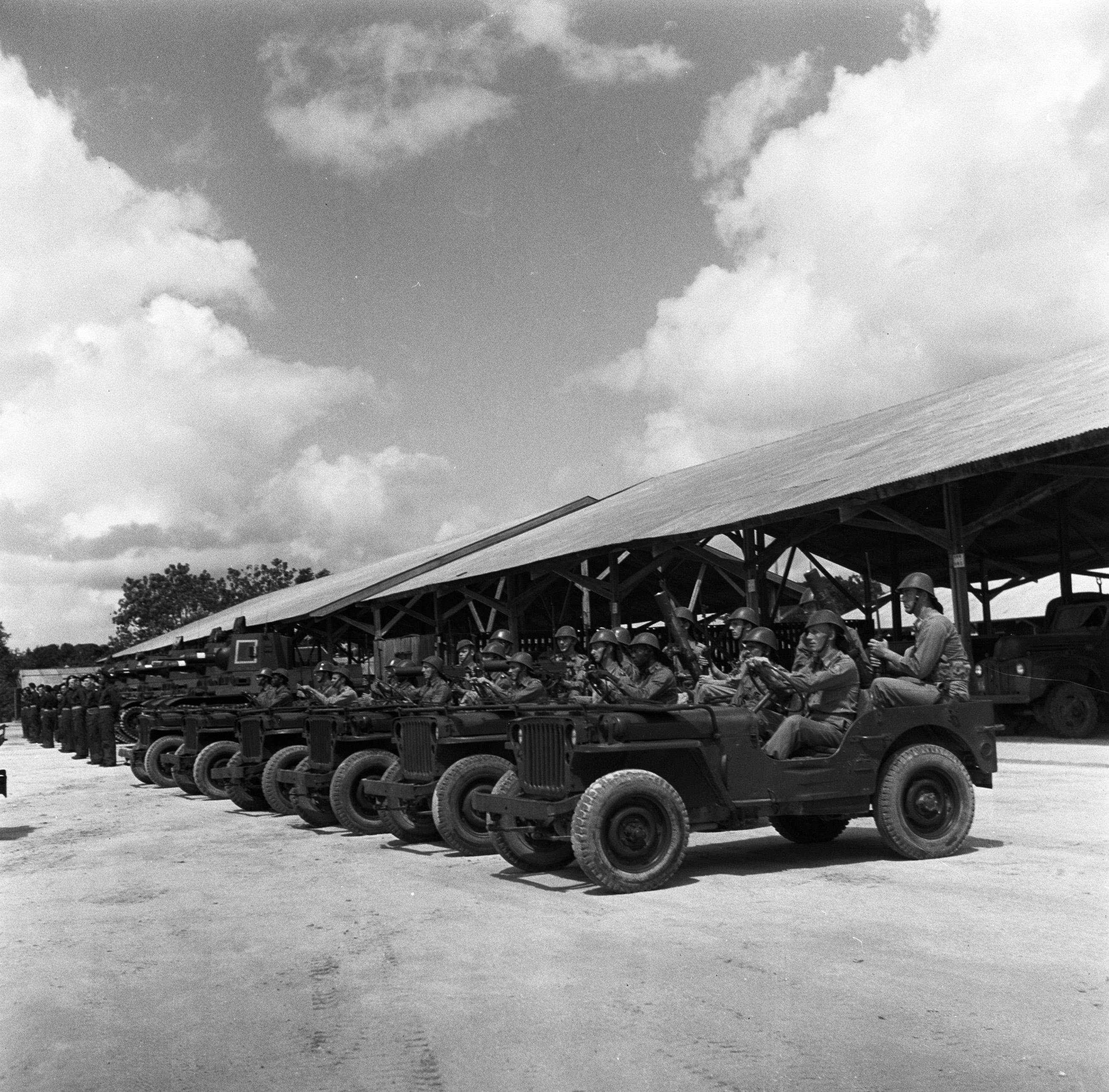
- Jeeps at a military parade (1947)

Site information
- Type: Headquarters / Barracks
- Owner: Suriname Ministry of Defence
- Operator: Suriname National Army

Location
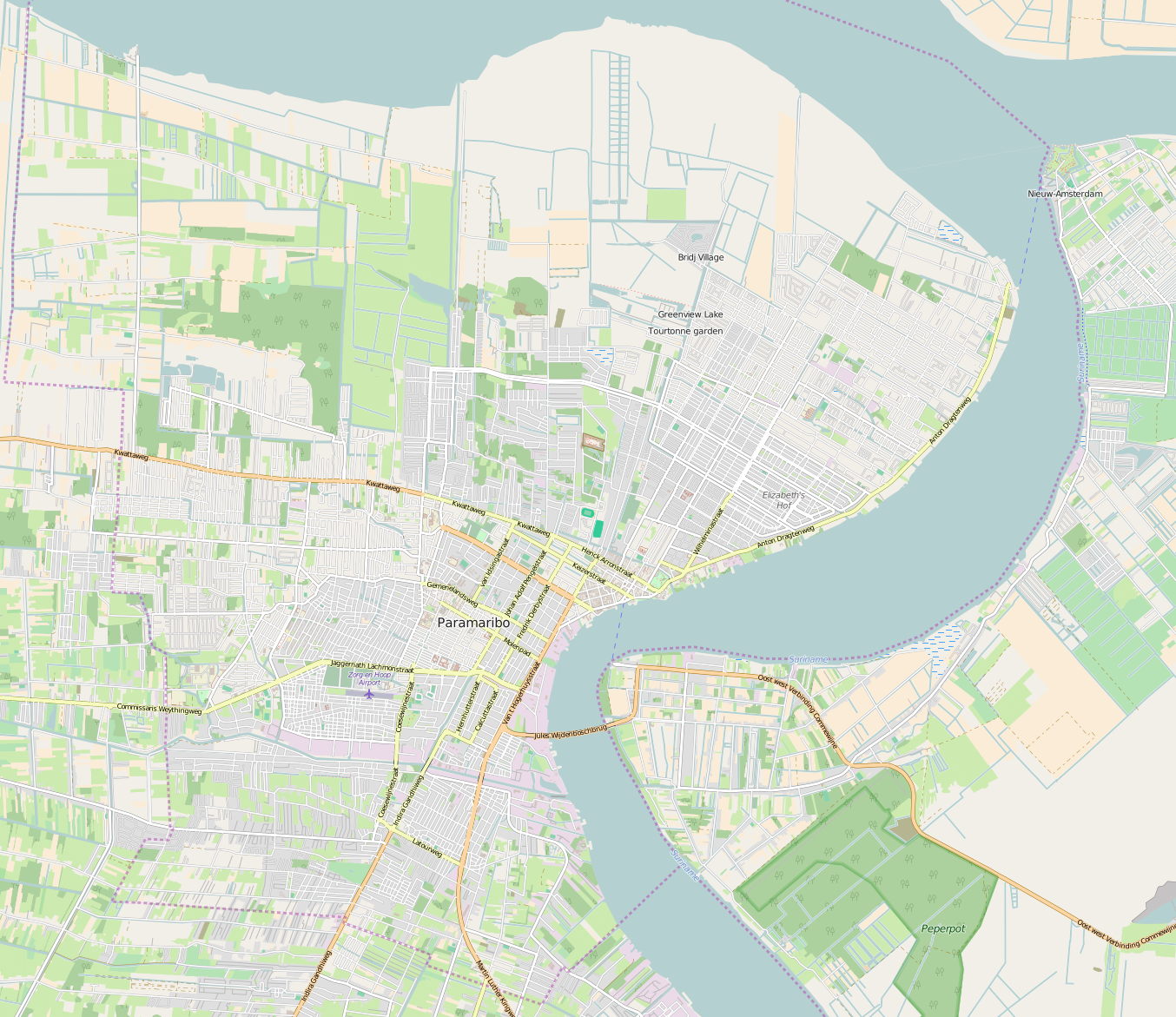
- Location within Paramaribo
- Coordinates: 5.82668°N 55.17828°W

Site history
- In use: World War II to Present

Garrison information
- Occupants: Surinamese Land Forces

The Memre Boekoe barracks (Dutch: Memre Boekoe-kazerne) is a military installation in Paramaribo, Suriname. It was constructed during World War II as barracks for the American soldiers stationed in Suriname. It was originally named Kampement Gemenelandsweg. In 1950, it was renamed Prins Bernhard kampement. After the independence of Suriname on 25 November 1975, it was renamed Memre Boekoe barracks after Fort Boekoe, a fort used during the Boni Wars. It is currently used as the headquarters of the Surinamese Land Forces.

== History ==
Suriname was a major producer of bauxite which is used to make aluminium, a vital resource for the aircraft industry. Between 1940 and 1943, Suriname supplied 65% of American imports of bauxite. On 1 September 1941, President Franklin D. Roosevelt made an offer to Queen Wilhelmina, to station 3,000 soldiers in Suriname. The number of troops was later revised to 2,000 soldiers who started to arrive from November 1941 onwards. To house the troops, land was bought from farmers near Paramaribo, and Kampement Gemenelandsweg was constructed. It would become the largest barracks in Suriname.

After World War II, the barracks were turned over to the Netherlands Armed Forces in Suriname. In 1950, it was renamed Prins Bernhard kampement after Prince Bernhard of Lippe-Biesterfeld. The barracks were the first stop for soldiers serving in Suriname.

After the independence of Suriname on 25 November 1975, it was renamed Memre Boekoe barracks meaning "remember Boekoe" which refers to Fort Boekoe, a fort used during the Boni Wars by the Aluku to defend against the colonial troops. Memre Boekoe was designated the headquarters of the Surinamese Land Forces.

On the night of 24 to 25 February 1980, Desi Bouterse committed a coup d'état. The first objective was to take the Memre Boekoe barracks. Lieutenant van Aalst who was on guard duty that night was killed during the fighting. During the coup, the barracks were used to intern captured politicians. On the night of 10 to 11 March 1982, Surendre Rambocus committed a counter-coup, and captured Memre Boekoe. Rambocus was betrayed and subsequently captured. He was killed on 8 December 1982 as part of the December murders.

The Memre Boekoe barracks are still in use as the headquarters, however it is no longer in use as barracks to house soldiers.
