= Judith Mok =

Dutch soprano, author and poet

Judith Mok (1954 in Bergen, North Holland – 26 November 2024 in Dublin, Ireland) was a Dutch soprano, author and poet. She moved to Ireland in her 40s and released novels and other works in English. Her last book is loosely based on family facts, but with a great deal of fiction.

== Early life and education ==
Judith Mok was born in 1954 in Bergen, North Holland, the daughter of Moses (later Maurits) Mok and Riemke Timmermans, who was not Jewish. who met after World War II. Her father was a writer, poet, and translator, and her mother was a housewife and a translator. Mok has an older half-sister who is Dutch and was a pre-adolescent when her grandparents were arrested during World War II.

As a young child, Mok moved back and forth between Bergen and Southern France. At age 14, she entered the Royal Conservatory of The Hague, where she was accepted into both the dance and music programs. She eventually studied under Elisabeth Schwarzkopf, a German-born opera soprano who had supported the Nazis and sang at Auschwitz concentration camp . At age 19, Mok published her first short story collection, then graduated the following year.

== Career ==
Mok's career included singing soprano with the opera, as well as writing.

She published her first poetry collection at age 19 and published two additional collections. She also published three novels, as well as a memoir, The State of Dark, in which she discussed her family's history related to the Holocaust, including the fact that 163 of her family members were killed. Some of her books were written in English and others in Dutch.

Mok began singing professionally when she was 21 years old. She also provided voice coaching to singers.

== Personal life ==
Mok was married to a Frenchman for six months, ending shortly after Mok met poet and critic Michael O'Loughlin in Barcelona. Mok became pregnant with O'Loughlin's daughter, Saar; the couple married in 1988, then moved to Ireland in 2002.

She spoke six languages.

== Publications ==
=== Anthology contributions ===
- O'Connor, Rebecca, ed. (2012). "Pirates". Scéalta: Short Stories by Irish Women. Telegram Books. ISBN 978-1-846-59159-4.

=== Poetry ===
- Sterkwater (in Dutch). Holland: de Prom. 1985. ISBN 978-9-068-01037-4.
- Materiaal (in Dutch). Holland: de Prom. 1991. ISBN 978-9-068-01284-2.
- Het Feestmaal (in Dutch). Holland: Meulenhoff. 1997. ISBN 978-9-029-05564-2.
- Gods of Babel. Salmon Poetry. 2011. ISBN 978-1-907-05680-2.

=== Fictional Memoir ===
- The State of Dark. Dublin: The Lilliput Press. 2022. ISBN 978-1-843-51850-1.

=== Novels ===
- Argelozen in het Circus (in Dutch). Holland: Toth. 1992. ISBN 978-9-068-68040-9.
- De Beul (in Dutch). Meulenhoff. 2000. ISBN 978-9-029-05836-0.
- Gael. London: Saqi Books. 2006. ISBN 978-1-846-59193-8.
