= C. Buddingh' =

Dutch poet and translator

Cornelis Buddingh
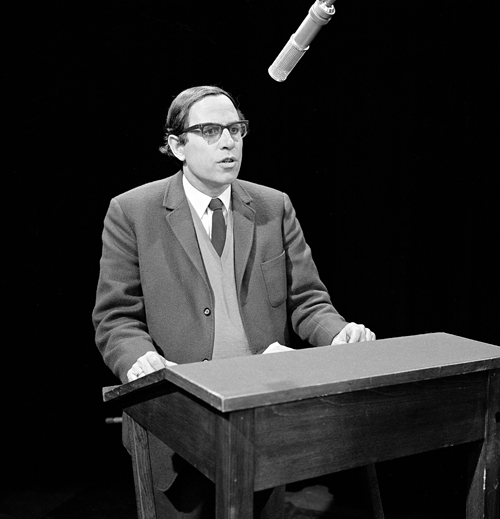
- Kees Buddingh' in 1967
- Born: 7 August 1918; Dordrecht
- Died: 24 November 1985 (aged 67)
- Occupations: Poet, translator

Cornelis "Kees" Buddingh' (7 August 1918 – 24 November 1985) was a Dutch poet, TV-presenter, translator. Amongst others he translated A Clockwork Orange and the complete works of William Shakespeare into Dutch. His son Wiebe Buddingh' later became the translator of Harry Potter into the Dutch language. The C. Buddingh'-prijs literary award is named after him.

== Biography ==
Kees Buddingh' was born on 7 August 1918 in Dordrecht. He went to the HBS from 1930 to 1935 and in 1938 he received his grade of MO-A in English in The Hague. He was in military service from 1938 to 1940, until he was diagnosed with tuberculosis. For that illness, he was treated for several years.

After several publications in the prewar literary magazines "Den Gulden Winckel" and "Criterium", Buddingh' debuted with his collection "Het geïrriteerde lied" (1941). These publications of surreal poems were illegal, due to the German occupation of the Netherlands in World War II. In 1944, a little under-the-counter book was clandestinely published, a series of erotic quatrains titled Praeter gallum cantat. Also his translations of four poems by W.H. Auden were issued clandestinely.

While in the sanitarium for his tuberculosis, he wrote his famous "gorgelrijmen", of which "De blauwbilgorgel" (1943) is the most famous. This particular poem was inspired by an English children's novel titled The Bluebillgurgle by E. Nesbit. He published the "gorgelrijmen" in many different editions, among which "10 gorgelrijmen", an illustrated collection of which only ten copies were printed in 1954. He also worked for "Gard Sivik" and "Barbarber", two Dutch magazines.

Later in his life, Buddingh' was a literary critic and a translator. He translated many English books into Dutch, including The Forsyte Saga by John Galsworthy and A Clockwork Orange, together with his son Wiebe. Together with the cartoonist Otto Dicke he created the newspaper comics Spekkie en Blekkie (1955-1965) and Jesje en Josje, for which he wrote the scripts.

Throughout his life, Buddingh' felt a strong connection to his native town of Dordrecht and the city features in many of his works including the poem "Ode aan Dordrecht". In 1975 he wrote the "Boekenweekgeschenk". Buddingh' published a translation of a volume of poetry by D.J. Enright, "Paradise Illustrated", in 1982.

He had a part-time job at the institute for translation studies at the University of Amsterdam. Buddingh' also was the chairman of the publishing company De Bezige Bij and was granted an honorary citizenship of Dordrecht on his 60th birthday.

== Personal life ==
In 1950, Buddingh' married Christina "Stientje" van Vuren. They had two sons, Sacha and Wiebe. He died while recovering from an operation on 24 November 1985.
