= F. van Dixhoorn =

Dutch poet (born 1948)

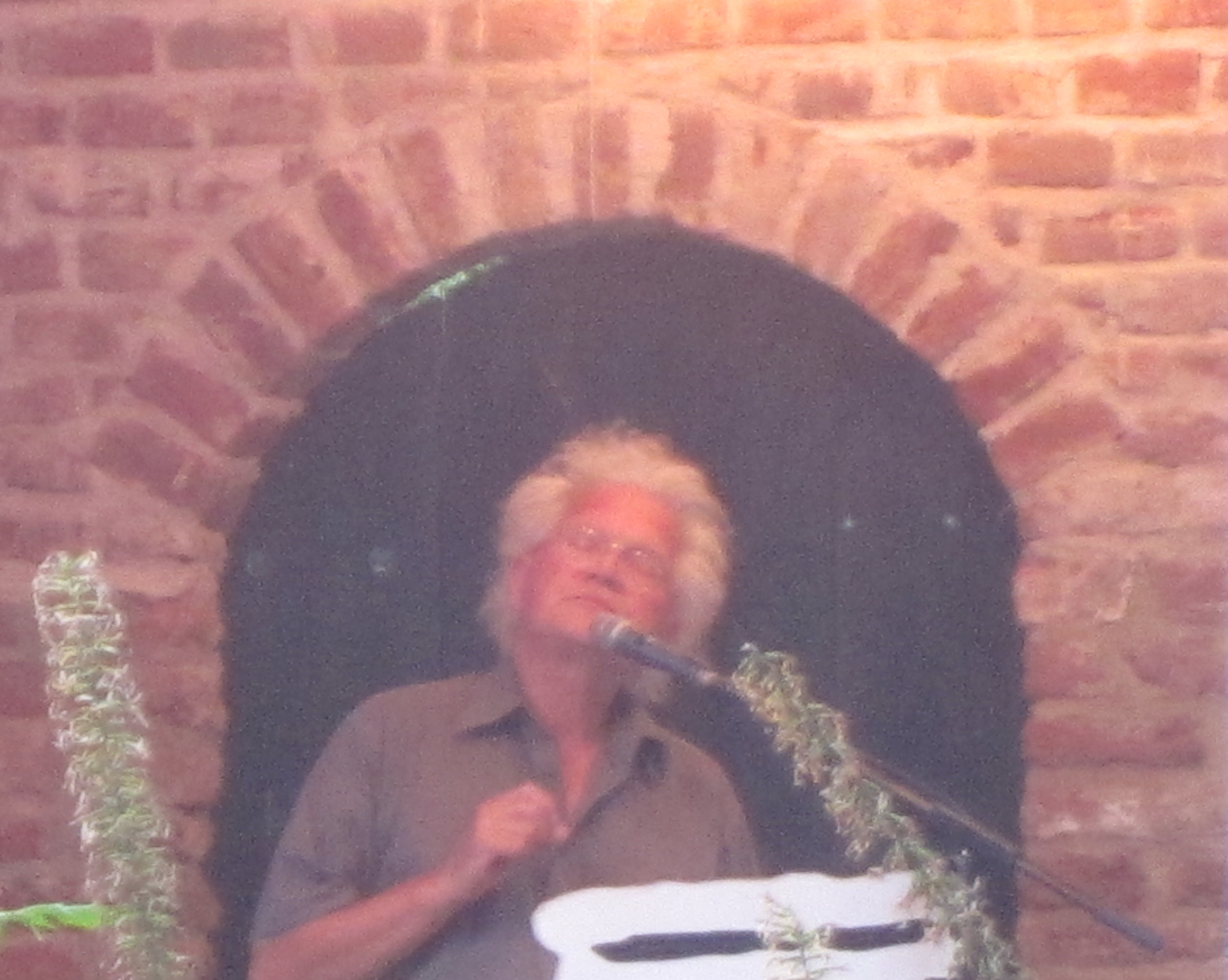
- F. van Dixhoorn in 2013
- Born: François Henricus Anthonie van Dixhoorn; 17 June 1948 (age 78); Hansweert
- Occupation: Poet
- Writing career
- Years active: 1994 – present
- Notable awards: C. Buddingh'-prijs 1994

François Henricus Anthonie van Dixhoorn (born 17 June 1948) is a Dutch poet.

== Career ==
Van Dixhoorn made his debut with the poetry collection Jaagpad / Rust in de tent / Zwaluwen vooruit in 1994. He won the C. Buddingh'-prijs for this debut.

He was nominated for the Ida Gerhardt Poëzieprijs in 2008 for his work Twee piepjes (2007). For his work De zon in de pan (2012) he was nominated for the VSB Poëzieprijs.

== Awards ==
- 1994: C. Buddingh'-prijs, Jaagpad / Rust in de tent / Zwaluwen vooruit

== Publications ==
- Jaagpad / Rust in de tent / Zwaluwen vooruit (1994)
- Armzwaai / Grote keg / Loodswezen I (1997)
- Takken molenwater / Kastanje jo / Hakke tonen / Uiterton / Molen in de zon (2000)
- Dan op de zeevaartschool (2003)
- Twee piepjes (2007)
- De zon in de pan (2012)
- Verre uittrap (2017)
