= Pem Sluijter =

Dutch poet (1939–2007)

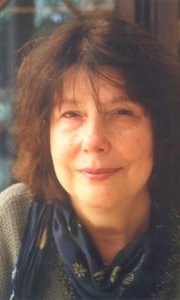
- Pem Sluijter in 2003
- Born: Petronella Eduarda Maria Rutgers-Sluijter; 15 May 1939; Middelburg, Netherlands
- Died: 18 December 2007 (aged 68); The Hague
- Occupation: Poet

Pem Sluijter (Note: Sometimes spelled as Pem Sluyter.) (15 May 1939 – 18 December 2007) was a Dutch poet.

== Biography ==
Pem Sluijter was born in 1939 in Middelburg, Netherlands.

Sluijter worked between 1959 and 1963 as journalist at Het Parool.

Sluijter made her debut at 58 years of age with poetry collection Roos is een bloem (1997). She won the C. Buddingh'-prijs for this debut. Her second poetry collection Het licht van Attica was published in 2004. Both of her publications were published by De Arbeiderspers.

Sluijter died in The Hague in December 2007.

In 2018, her poem Nachtbraak was added to a wall in the Batjanstraat in The Hague, both in Dutch and translated into English.

== Awards ==
- 1997: C. Buddingh'-prijs, Roos is een bloem

== Publications ==
- Roos is een bloem (1997)
- Het licht van Attica (2004)
