= Twee minuten stilte =

Dutch detective novel by Karel van het Reve

Karel van het Reve, Twee minuten stilte. Front cover by Nicolaas Wijnberg.

Twee minuten stilte ("Two minutes' silence") is a novel by Dutch academic, writer, and essayist Karel van het Reve. First published in 1959, the detective novel follows the investigation into a murder at a Dutch research institute. A barely disguised roman à clef, many of its characters are based on colleagues and friends of the author, and the novel criticizes an academic system full of meaningless formalities and historiography as practiced by Soviet scholars and their Western sympathizers. The novel was reprinted in 1960 and 1962, and again in 2001 together with Van het Reve's other novel, Nacht op de kale berg ("Night on the bare mountain").

== Background ==
Van het Reve (a scholar of Russian literature and Soviet and Communist studies) enjoyed the genre of the detective novel, and many references to it are found in his work. Literature critic Ab Visser listed Twee minuten stilte among the "professors detective novels", along with a half a dozen of such novels written by Dutch professors in the period 1946–1966. One of those was Moord in Meppel by Jacques Presser, and in a 1954 letter to Presser, his mentor, he wrote of how he had just read the novel for a third time.

The novel has aspects of the roman à clef. Real-life characters appear in the novel, and many of the names are drawn from or inspired by real people: the main character is named for Lodewijk Prins, the chess player, and he works at the Institute for Eastern European Social History, a stand-in for the Russia Institute in Amsterdam where Van het Reve worked from 1948 to 1957. One of his colleagues was Jan Bezemer, the model for the character called Peter Bruning in an early version, and later named Peter Struve, inspired by the American scholar of Slavic studies, Gleb Petrovich Struve. Prins is a scholar of Slobodian language and culture – this is intended to be a Slavic language, and Van het Reve (a professor of Slavic literature) constructed a plot whose Soviet allegory is only thinly veiled: Slobodia is the Soviet Union, the country's newspaper is called Krivda ("lie"), rather than Pravda ("truth"), one of the magazines mentioned in the book is Duszegubinsk, resembling a Russian word for murderer, and Slobodia's capital is called Rabsk, related to the Russian word for "slavish". Finally, the missing letters were written by the politician Iljin (or Lenin), corresponding with Bronstein (Trotski's real name, as well as the name of another chess player, David Bronstein). "Uncle Ko", who is described both as a person and as an institution, is Stalin ("father Stalin").

Van het Reve (who, while a scholar of Slavic studies, is praised more for his essayistic contributions to polemics) used various characters and events in Twee minuten stilte to satirize academic life. The institute's reading room, in all its formality, suggests the general atmosphere that predominates in such environments – Jan Blokker (in a comparison with J. J. Voskuil's Het Bureau), said "the author describes with perverse pleasure the typical office bullying that predominates in such institutions". Other objects of satire (that would later become his well-known hobby-horses) are the low academic salaries, the hierarchies, and the meaningless formalities, in particular the process of academic promotion.

== Plot ==
Lodewijk Prins, a librarian at the Institute for Eastern European Social History in Amsterdam and the first-person narrator of the novel, returns home after spending a year studying in the United States on a scholarship from the Chevrolet foundation. He learns that his boss, Karel Maria van Bever, the institute's director, has been killed by a bomb inside the institute. His colleague, Peter Struve (who is about to defend his thesis and receive his doctorate), explains all the events that have taken place: Van Bever was killed during the two minutes of silence at 8 pm on 4 May, the Remembrance of the Dead, just before an unusual meeting he had called himself. Central in the mystery is the disappearance of a set of letters by a dead Slobodian revolutionary, Iljin, which have been taken from the safe and replaced by a set of reproductions of other letters by the same person. The letters cast doubt on the Slobodian regime, and their publication is likely to cause a public relations nightmare for the regime. Van Bever had acquired the letters months before, but was hesitant about publishing them. Prins, by accident, discovers that someone has been using the library card catalog to communicate from inside the institute to persons unknown, who are called to the institute by way of postcards sent to request the return of overdue books.

Prins suspects the murder has been committed by an agent of the Slobodian regime, and alters a message to make it say that the letters are to be exchanged the next day; right after Struve's dissertation defense and promotion, they are to be placed on a table so the other party can retrieve them. During the reception he notices that Struve places his briefcase on the table, and when a man comes and takes it away, Prins follows him and calls him out. The man pulls out a gun and shoots, but misses, because Struve pushes Prins aside. The man is arrested, and it turns out that he indeed was a Slobodian agent hoping to retrieve the letters. Van Bever had taken the letters from the safe and hid them (in plain sight, in a book held in the library of the City University). His death was accidental: Struve, on his way to the meeting, had picked up a suspicious package addressed to Van Bever and dropped it from an upper floor inside the institute in what he thought was a safe place, in order to see if it would explode. Unfortunately this was the exact place where Van Bever stopped for the two minutes of silence on 4 May.

== Publication history ==
Reve started on the manuscript (then titled Opgewarmd lijk, "Warmed-up corpse") in 1954; the core of the later novel was already there – Lodewijk Prins returns from a yearlong research trip to the United States, and on his return deals with the murder of the professor of the Dutch research institute that employs him. In the following years, he worked especially on the ending, which went through numerous drafts and revision. He wrote to his publisher Geert A. van Oorschot in May 1959, asking him if he were interested in a detective novel in which a professor is murdered; he requested that the book be affordable, in contrast to Van Oorschot's usual practice of publishing expensive, specialized books. Van Oorschot responded positively, and the book was published that same year, in October 1959. Not many months later Van Oorschot reprinted the book, in March 1960, as the first volume in a series of affordable reprints and (some) new publications, the Witte Olifanten ("white elephants"), with cover illustrations by the artist Nicolaas Wijnberg. The novel was reprinted in the same series in 1962, and it was republished in 2001, along with his 1961 novel Nacht op de kale berg.

Van het Reve seems to have struggled with the ending, judging from the manuscript, which has more corrections in the final section than anywhere else, including alternate endings. Marsha Keja considers the published version to be rather weak, and comments that it is likely that Van het Reve simply did not care for it, and that "relativized" the idea of suspense. One of the pieces of evidence she cites is that while the reader is waiting for the denouement, the narrator slows down for a few pages to describe how he regained consciousness after being knocked down – ending with a few sentences on the "where am I?" trope and referring the reader to the authors of Dorian Gray and Lolita. As for suspense in the detective novel, Van het Reve commented (while questioning a candidate's claims during an academic promotion) that he did not think a good detective novel loses its readers' attention on a second reading, and that he reread some of the classic detective novels ten times, every time with pleasure.

A curious detail was explained by Marsha Keja, editor of the literary magazine De Parelduiker : the first edition included a fake letter by Van het Reve to Van Oorschot, dated 6 July 1959, which purports to have been included with the manuscript and explains that the events in the novels reflected a real murder, which Van Oorschot knew about, and which Van het Reve wanted him to keep secret. This caused confusion among later readers (who bought the book second-hand, or found it in an old collection), some of whom thought they had accidentally come across a real letter, and returned it to Van het Reve.

== Themes and criticism ==
=== Soviet historiography ===
The novel (which was published during the Cold War) treats, in an allegorical way, the influence Soviet politics has on individuals and institutions in the West. It also thematizes historiography, according to critic Jan Gielkens, who cites the commentary on Slobodian historiography by Struve: Neem een biograaf die een allemachtig aardige afsluiting van een hoofdstuk zou hebben als het hem maar mogelijk was er een paar dingen in te laten voorvallen waarvan hij zeker weet dat ze niet gebeurd zijn. De kwaliteit van zijn werk lijdt daar in zekere zin onder. De kameraden echter hebben van de feiten geen last. Dat geeft soms een bovenaardse schoonheid aan hun redeneringen. ("Consider a biographer, who would have a really nice conclusion to a chapter if he could only make a few things happen that he knows didn't happen. The quality of his work would suffer, to some extent, but the comrades are not bothered by facts. Sometimes that lends an supernatural beauty to their arguments.")

=== The fake letter and the supposed real murder ===
Van het Reve suggested that the murder of Van Bever was based on a real event, and at least one critic saw this as a reason for his wanting (or claiming to want) to publish the book under a pseudonym. The aforementioned fake letter was essential in this ruse, and proved of interest to later critics and journalists. The story behind it was unearthed (years after Van het Reve's death) by Arjan Visser, a journalist for the Dutch daily Trouw. He found a copy of the novel, with the letter, among a set of books from the recently deceased Willem Heinemeijer, a social geographer who was the person behind the novel's Professor de Bock, who presided over Peter Struve's doctoral examination after the death of Van Bever. Van het Reve's widow explained to Visser that the letter was a joke, the kind that Van het Reve enjoyed making. It did lead to more speculation: the letter speaks of the murder of "B. te O.", a person whose last name starts with "B" in a town whose name starts with "O". Igor Cornelissen, a newspaper editor and friend of Van het Reve, proposed to Visser that it might have been "Becker" from Odessa. Bruno Becker was Van het Reve's former professor, and director of the Russia Institute, and the model for the novel's Van Bever, but he was born in Saint Petersburg, though he later lived in Oegstgeest. Author Adriaan van Dis thought it could be "Bezemer" from Oldeberkoop, and Jan Bezemer was the model for Peter Struve. Bezemer, however, responded that the events in the novel were purely fictional. Still, in 2004, Hans Renders, critiquing a biography of the author in Vrij Nederland, asked whether it would not have been interesting if the biographer had dived into the supposed real event behind the novel.

=== Reviews and legacy ===
Where Van het Reve's interest lay in the difference between truth and fiction, contemporary reviews focused more on the opposition between detective novel and literature, and frequently discussed the denouement, which for a detective novel was considered meagre. Critic and essayist Pierre H. Dubois asked whether the book should be considered a work of literature in the first place, and suggested it should not, when measured by literary standards – and then asked if such a book should be measured by literary standards in the first place. Poet and critic Hans Warren was more positive, and remarked that (setting aside the element of suspense) the book certainly had literary value, and said its style was "dry, business-like, almost disinterested, and seasoned with a strong dose of irony, mockery, and criticism." Nico Scheepmaker, reviewing the novel for Hollands Weekblad, thought the novel "a highly amusing and educational description of the milieu in which a murder is committed".

A copy of the novel was owned by Dutch writer Maarten Biesheuvel (1939–2020), with a dedication on the title page: "Deze eerste druk is door Maarten Biesheuvel gestolen uit het Academisch Ziekenhuis. Was getekend: K. van het Reve." ("This first edition was stolen by Maarten Biesheuvel from the Academic Hospital. Signed, K. van het Reve.")
