= Gouden Ganzenveer =

Dutch literary award

The Gouden Ganzenveer ("Golden goose quill") is a Dutch cultural award initiated in 1955, given annually to a person or organization of great significance to the written and printed word. Recipients are selected by an academy of people from the cultural, political, scientific, and corporate world. Members meet once a year; the winner is announced each year in January and honored in April. From 1995 to 1998 the award was granted by the Koninklijke Nederlandse Uitgeversbond, the Royal Dutch Organization of Publishers; since 2000, it is granted by a separate organization.

Since 2022, the Gouden Ganzerveer laureate awards the Jonge Veer ("Young Quill") to a person under 35 who has made an outstanding contribution to the Dutch language. The first recipient was Nina Polak, who was nominated by Nelleke Noordervliet.

== Recipients ==
=== The Gouden Ganzenveer ===
Note: some years the award was not given.

- 1955 – Royal Netherlands Academy of Arts and Sciences
- 1957 – Adriaan Jacob Barnouw, historian
- 1960 – Jan Oort, astronomer
- 1965 – Bram Hammacher, art historian
- 1980 – Herman de la Fontaine Verwey, librarian
- 1983 – Bernard Lievegoed, psychiatrist and author
- 1984 – Hans Freudenthal, mathematician
- 1985 – Jan Tinbergen, economist
- 1986 – Natuurmonumenten, environmental and cultural organization
- 1987 – Armando, painter and writer
- 1988 – Loe de Jong, historian
- 1989 – Edward Schillebeeckx, theologian
- 1990 – Lucas Reijnders, environmental scientist
- 1991 – "Cultural Supplement" section of NRC Handelsblad
- 1992 – Arthur Lehning, writer and historian
- 1993 – Pierre H. Dubois and Simone Dubois, writers
- 1996 – Henk Hofland, journalist
- 1999 – Nederlands Letterkundig Museum
- 2002 – Michaël Zeeman, critic and writer
- 2003 – Jan Blokker, writer and journalist
- 2004 – Kees van Kooten, writer
- 2005 – Maria Goos, writer
- 2006 – Peter van Straaten, artist and writer
- 2007 – Tom Lanoye, writer
- 2008 – Joost Zwagerman, writer
- 2009 – Adriaan van Dis, writer
- 2010 – Joke van Leeuwen, writer and illustrator
- 2011 – Remco Campert, poet and writer
- 2012 – Annejet van der Zijl, writer
- 2013 – Ramsey Nasr, poet, writer, actor, and director
- 2014 – David Van Reybrouck
- 2015 – Geert Mak, journalist and writer
- 2016 – Xandra Schutte, journalist
- 2017 – Arnon Grunberg
- 2018 – Antjie Krog
- 2019 - Ian Buruma
- 2020 - Abdelkader Benali, Moroccan-Dutch writer and journalist
- 2021 - Margot Dijkgraaf, Dutch literary critic
- 2022 - Nelleke Noordervliet, Dutch writer
- 2023 - Jan Brokken, Dutch writer
- 2024 - Babs Gons, Dutch poet
- 2025 - Bart Van Loo, Flemish writer

=== The Jonge Veer ===
- 2022 - Nina Polak
- 2023 - Charlotte Van den Broeck
- 2024 - Aya Sabi
- 2025 - Jonas Roelens
- 2026 - Lisette Ma Neza
