= Aya Sabi =

Belgian writer and columnist (born 1995)

- Born: 1995 (age 30–31); Roermond, the Netherlands
- Occupations: Writer; Columnist
- Website: ayasabi.be

Aya Sabi (born 1995 in Roermond, The Netherlands) is a Belgian, Dutch and Moroccan writer and columnist.

== Early life and education ==
Sabi was born in the Netherlands and moved to Limburg, Belgium at age thirteen. In her youth, she mainly wrote poetry and participated in several writing contests. At age 13, she sent a manuscript it to several publishers. She studied Biomedical Sciences at Maastricht University and attained a Master in Arabic and Islamic Studies from KU Leuven.

== Career ==
In 2017, Sabi debuted with short story collection titled Verkruimeld land. The idea for the book was sparked during a visit in Casablanca, where she saw a stark contrast between the rich neighbourhood she stayed in and the nearby slums. The book was compared to Zadie Smith's The Embassy of Cambodia and described as "blunt and gentle" and "resonating with current political questions about power dynamics between men and women, as well as migration."

In 2022, Sabi published her first novel Half Leven, a family chronicle following three generations of Moroccan women searching for identity, connection and emancipation.

In 2023, she released the novella Juli, about a middle-aged playwright on a sweltering day in Brussels. The book was part of a series in twelve authors, amongst which Saskia De Coster, Annelies Verbeke and Bregje Hofstede, each wrote a book corresponding to a month, published by Das Mag.

In 2025, she published Zo zingt de pijn: Van intergenerationeel trauma naar intergenerationele troost, which consists of essays about intergenerational consolation and how trauma might be healed in a non-verbal, bodily manner. The book touches on her chronic stress and PMOS-diagnosis. Together with actress and theater producer Dounia Mahammed, she reworked the piece into a theater monologue titled Dit is (niet) de evolutietheorie van de troost.

Sabi is a columnist at De Morgen, and previously wrote for MO* magazine. She previously wrote for the NTGent magazine.

== Activism and controversy ==
In 2017, Sabi had a Twitter discussion with Belgian's State Secretary for Asylum, Migration Theo Francken about the changes to the Belgian Immigration Act. This interaction gathered international attention and was covered in The New York Times. Sabi then wrote an open letter to Francken titled "So I am deportable" (dutch: "Ik ben dus deporteerbaar") in the newspaper De Morgen, in which she called his policy "dehumanising".

In 2025, she denounced a local cafe in Halle on social media for including an ethnic slur in the naming of one of their drinks, declaring the menu to resemble a menu you would expect "in the colonial sector of a musty museum." The cafe owner then changed the name, albeit noting that "some people these days are quick to get indignant and take offence."

== Bibliography ==
Year	Title	Publisher	ISBN
2017	Verkruimeld land	Uitgeverij Atlas Contact	9789025451059
2018	Dichter bij Meester Bart	Pepper Books	9789020633696
2019	Le Ravage d'Ali Baba	Kaap	9789463965521
2022	Half leven	Das Mag Uitgevers	9789493168442
2022	Hoe de zon soms anders staat - Moeders met een migratieachtergrond over hun zorgenkind	Mammoet	9789462673885
2023	Juli	Das Mag Uitgevers	9789493248809
2025	Zo zingt de pijn: Van intergenerationeel trauma naar intergenerationele troost	Das Mag Uitgevers	9789493399334

== Awards ==
Sabi has been nominated and won the following awards:

- 2017: Nominated for the Opzij Literatuurpijs
- 2017: Nominated for the LangZullenWeLezen trophy
- 2023: Won the PrixFintro Public Prize for Half leven
- 2023: Shortlisted for the Confituur Boekhandelsprijs for Half leven
- 2023: Shortlisted for the Hebban Debuutsprijs for Half leven
- 2023: Nominated for the Opzij Literatuurrpijs
- 2024: Won the Ultima for Emerging Talent
- 2024: Won the Jonge Veer as nominated by Babs Gons
