= Michaël Zeeman =

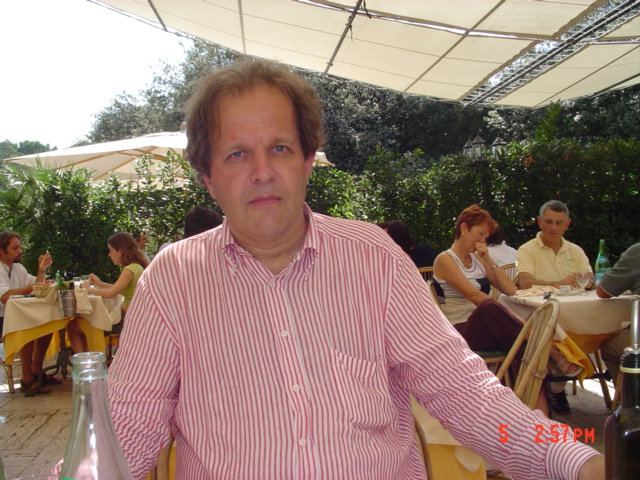
- Born: 15 May 1958; Marken, Netherlands
- Died: 27 July 2009 (aged 50); Rotterdam, Netherlands
- Occupations: Journalist; Author; Editor; Columnist; Literary critic.

Michaël Zeeman (12 September 1958 – 27 July 2009) was a Dutch journalist, author, editor, columnist and literary critic. He received the C. Buddingh'-prijs, given annually for the best debut in Dutch poetry (named for C. Buddingh'), for Beeldenstorm in 1991. He was also awarded the Gouden Ganzenveer, given to people who have significantly contributed to Dutch literary culture, in 2002.

Zeeman died in July 2009 at the age of 50, of a brain tumor.

== Biography ==
Zeeman was born in Marken, a small, mainly Protestant town north of Amsterdam, into the family of a pastor. His father wanted him to study theology, but Zeeman left faith and family behind to study philosophy in Utrecht and Groningen, though he never got his degree. He worked in a bookstore in Leeuwarden and began reviewing literature.

== Literary career and criticism ==
From 1991, Zeeman wrote columns and essays for the Dutch newspaper de Volkskrant, on poetry, prose fiction and non-fiction, music, theater, and visual arts. He also published a number of poetry and short story collections. For two years he was the editor of the arts section of de Volkskrant, but lost that position because he was notoriously difficult to work with; afterward, he worked freelance, and for a while was the paper's cultural correspondent in Rome. His knowledge of literature was immense and his work as a critic influential. He has been compared to Kees Fens, the most widely recognized Dutch critic). Especially notable was his feud with Joost Zwagerman, one of the most prominent Dutch writers from the late 1980s onwards, whose novel Chaos en rumoer was "publicly executed" in Zeeman's television program.

== Television career ==
Starting in the mid-1990s, Zeeman presented two literary programs for VPRO television which gained national recognition, Kamer met Uitzicht and Zeeman met Boeken (1995–2002), for which he interviewed writers such as Jeanette Winterson, Edward Said, and Philip Roth.
