= Nijeberkoop =

Nijeberkoop Nijeberkeap
- Village
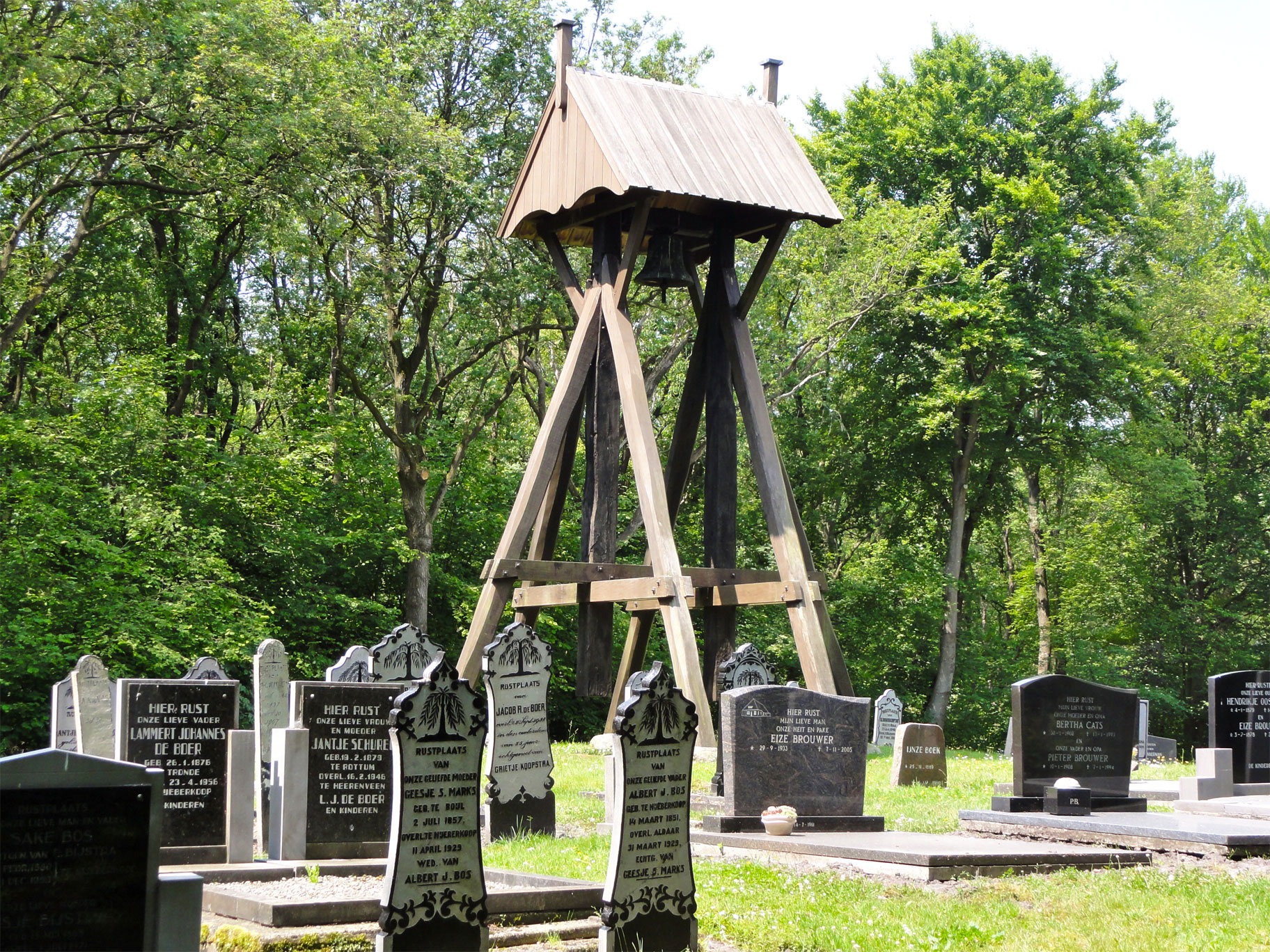
- Nijeberkoop Cemetery

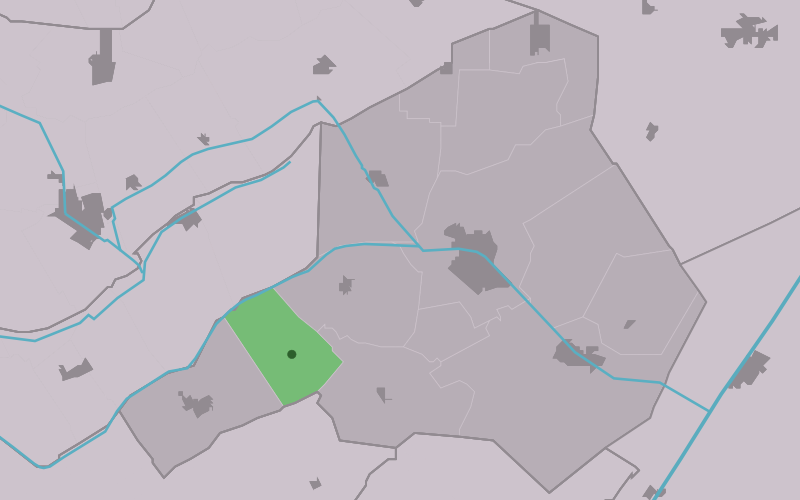
- Location in Ooststellingwerf municipality

- Location in the Netherlands Nijeberkoop (Netherlands)
- Country: Netherlands
- Province: Friesland
- Municipality: Ooststellingwerf

Area
  - Total: 12.19 km^{2} (4.71 sq mi)
- Elevation: 4 m (13 ft)

Population (2021)
  - Total: 275
  - Density: 22.6/km^{2} (58.4/sq mi)
- Time zone: UTC+1 (CET)
  - Summer (DST): UTC+2 (CEST)
- Postal code: 8422
- Dialing code: 0516

Nijeberkoop (Dutch pronunciation: [ˌnɛiəbərˈkoːp]; West Frisian: Nijeberkeap) is a village consisting of about 270 inhabitants in the municipality of Ooststellingwerf in 2017 in the east of Friesland, the Netherlands.

The village was first mentioned in 1320 as Oostbrocop, Westbrocop. It used to be two hamlets. Nije (new) was added to distinguish between Oldeberkoop. The etymology of -berkoop is unclear. Nijeberkoop developed in the 13th century as a linear settlement. In 1826, the church was demolished and only the bell tower remained. Nijeberkoop was home to 142 people in 1840.

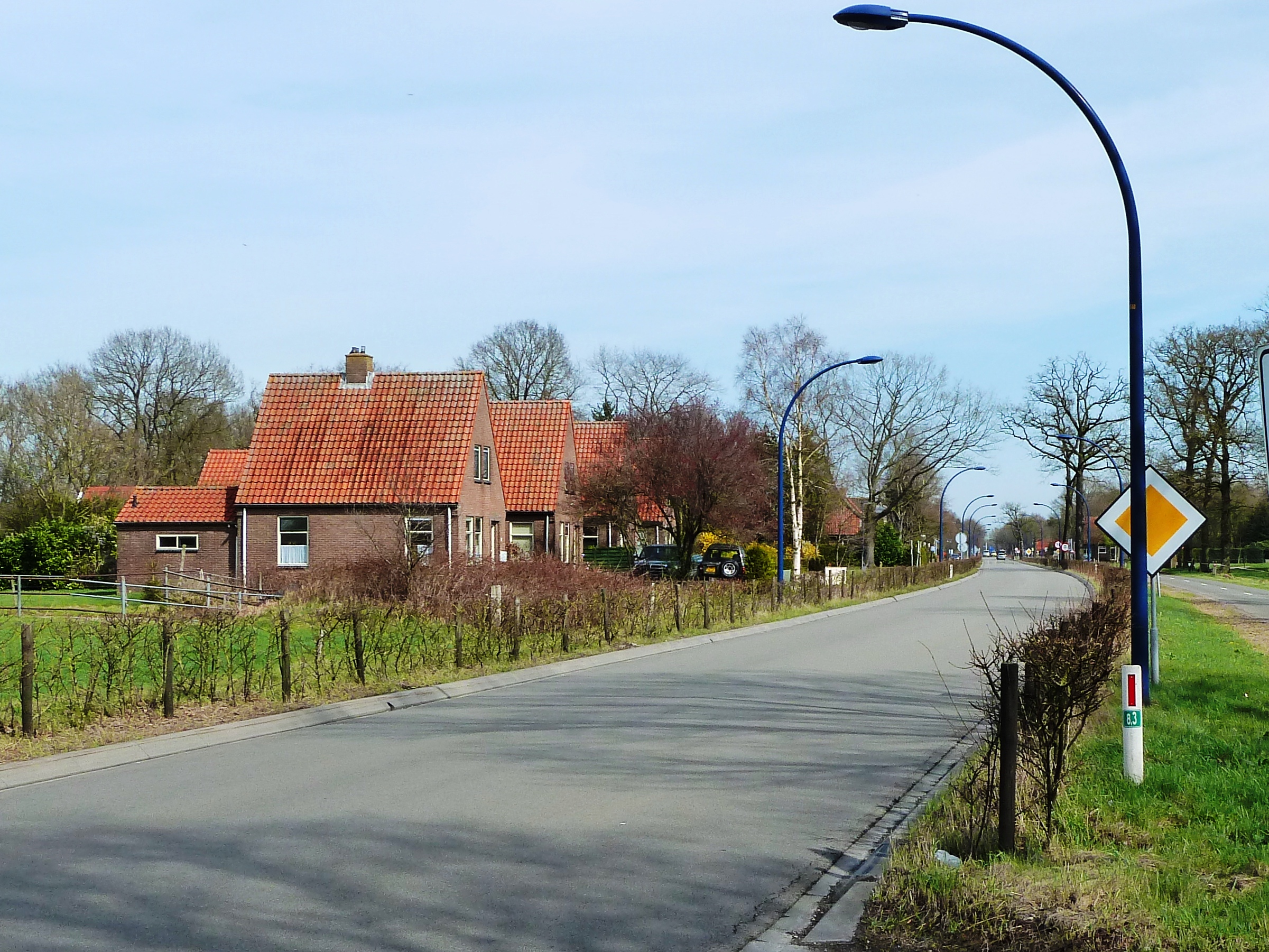
Street view
