= Peter Reddaway =

British-American political scientist (1939–2024)

Peter Brian Reddaway (September 18, 1939 – July 28, 2024) was a British-American political scientist and expert on Russia, known primarily for his study of its human rights and dissident movement.

== Life and career ==
Peter Reddaway was born in Cambridge. He graduated from Cambridge University and did graduate studies at Harvard, Moscow State University, and the London School of Economics and Political Science where he later taught. Reddaway moved to the United States in the 1980s and served as Director of the Kennan Institute for Advanced Russian Studies (1986–89). From 1989 until his retirement in 2004, he was Professor of Political Science at the George Washington University, teaching courses on Soviet and post-Soviet history. He was Emeritus Professor at this university.

Starting from the early 1970s, Reddaway was closely involved with the Soviet dissident and human rights movement. He published some of his articles about it in the Dissent. Reddaway has provided a testimony on corruption in Russia to USA congressional hearings. According to one of Reddaway's presentations, "by 1998, Yeltsin's regime and the Russian state had become not just dangerously weak and corrupt, but also... financially dependent on Russia's wealthy elite"; he viewed Vladimir Putin as a product of the Yeltsin system, who, "if he does try to change the system... will find himself a prisoner of the system."

Reddaway died in the United States on July 28, 2024, at the age of 84.

== Publications ==
His major publications included:

- Uncensored Russia: The Human Rights Movement in the USSR (1972), which consists primarily of his translation of the first 11 issues of the underground Chronicle of Current Events;
- Psychiatric Terror: How Soviet Psychiatry is Used to Suppress Dissent (co-authored with Sidney Bloch, 1977);
- Soviet Psychiatric Abuse (co-authored with Sidney Bloch, 1984);
- Authority, Power and Policy in the USSR (co-edited with T.H. Rigby and Archie Brown, 1980);
- The Tragedy of Russia's Reforms: Market Bolshevism Against Democracy (co-authored with Dmitri Glinski, 2001);
- The Dynamics of Russian Politics: Putin's Reform of Federal-Regional Relations (in 2 volumes, co-authored with Robert Orttung, 2003–2004),
- The Dissidents: A Memoir (2020).

== See also ==
- Alexander Herzen Foundation
