= Alexander Herzen Foundation =

Non-profit foundation

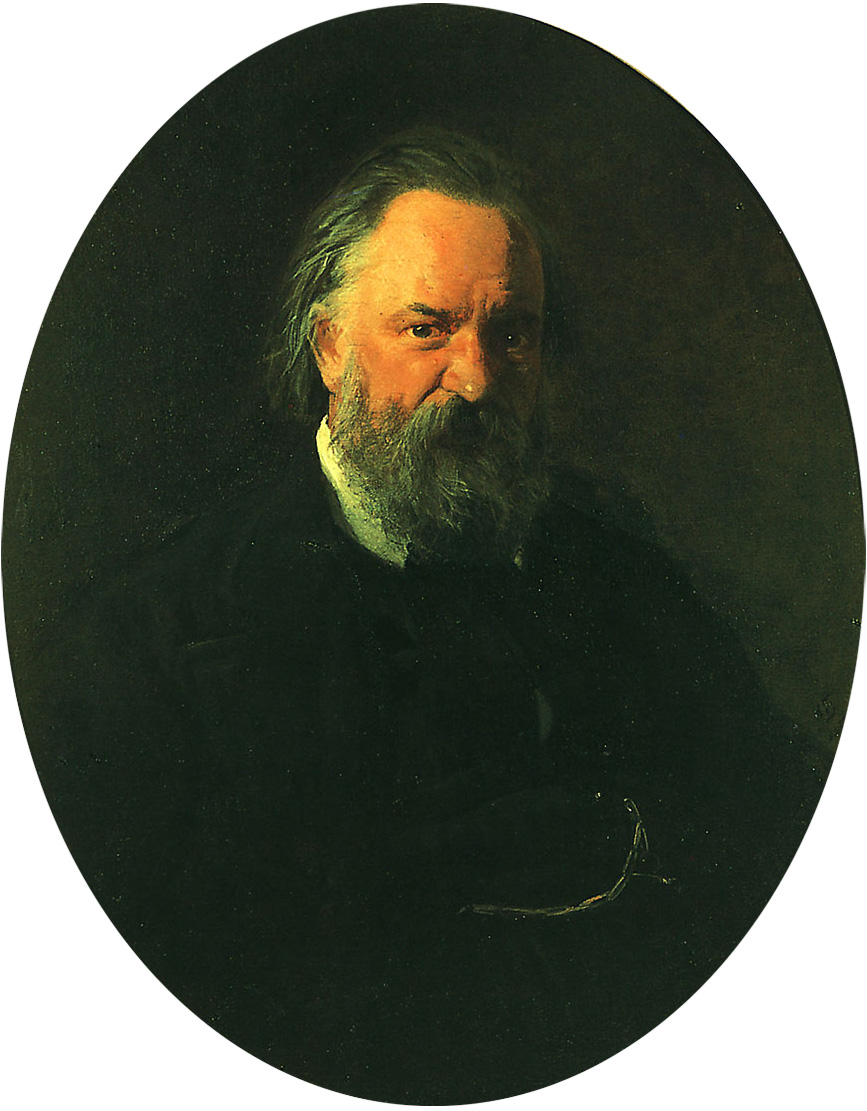
Alexander Herzen, painted by Nikolai Ge

The Alexander Herzen Foundation (in Dutch: Alexander Herzenstichting) was a non-profit foundation, legally established in 1969 in Amsterdam, dedicated to publish samizdat manuscripts from dissidents in the former Soviet Union in the original language or in translation. The Alexander Herzen Foundation was the first to publish accounts of the Sinyavsky-Daniel trial and the works of Andrei Amalrik, Yuli Daniel, Larisa Bogoraz, Andrei Sinyavsky, Pavel Litvinov and others in the West. The Foundation was ended legally in 1998.

== History ==
The Alexander Herzen Foundation was legally established May 19, 1969, in Amsterdam. The Dutch slavist and essayist Karel van het Reve (1921–1999) took the initiative and was one of the trustees. The other trustees were the Dutch historian Jan Willem Bezemer (1921–2000) and the British-American politicologist Peter Reddaway (1939). Frank Fisher and his wife Elisabeth Fisher-Spanjer were also involved in its founding. The date of establishment of the foundation is mentioned in the obituary written by Robert van Amerongen after Van het Reve's death. The Foundation is named after Alexander Herzen, the Russian philosopher and writer who founded in 1853 an independent publishing house in Russia.

Karel van het Reve was in 1967-1968 foreign correspondent in Moscow of the Dutch daily newspaper Het Parool. He considered, quite unusual at the time, collecting samizdat documents as one of his journalistic tasks. He published, among other pieces, the famous Andrei Sakharov memorandum Reflections on Progress, Peaceful Coexistence, and Intellectual Freedom. This was the overture to the Alexander Herzen Foundation.

The Foundation was established to publish samizdat manuscripts in the West and to preserve the revenues for the authors of the manuscripts. The annotated texts being published in the original language was also important to counteract corrupt editions and bad translations.

The foundation ended in 1998 because the Cold War and the strong repression of the press in Russia and Eastern Europe were over.

== Published (selection) ==
- Andrej Amarik, Will the Soviet Union survive until 1984 (1969)
- Pavel Litvinov, The Trial of the Four. A collection of Materials on the Case of Galanskov, Ginzburg, Dobrovolsky & Lashkova (1972)
