= Franz Jakubowski =

Franz Jakubowski (10 June 1912, Posen, Province of Posen, Prussia, Germany, now Poznan, Poland – 1970, U.S.) was a philosopher and Western Marxist theorist.

== Life ==
Born in Prussia, he grew up in what was then the Free City of Danzig. His father was a doctor. From 1930 to 1933 he studied law in Heidelberg, Berlin, Munich and Breslau, before completing his studies in political science at Basel University. After student activism and the agitational role he would briefly play in Danzig, Jakubowski abandoned Europe, and settled in the US, changing his name to Frank Fisher and marrying Margaret Citron with whom he had two children Thomas and Robert Fisher. In the 1970s he moved back to Europe and married Elisabeth Spanjer. There he would play a part in establishing the Alexander Herzen Foundation, a publisher of samizdat soviet literature.

== Contribution to theory ==
Jakubowski published his only major work, a book based on his doctoral thesis, in Danzig, 1936. It is entitled Ideology and Superstructure in Historical Materialism, ISBN 0-85031-154-3 and may be seen as an extension to the seminal work of Karl Korsch on the centrality of the Hegelian dialectic to Marxian thought. Jakubowski rehearses for the reader the steps Marx and Engels took away from Hegel, via Feuerbach, to their 'historical materialist' position. Its unique contribution to Marxian thought is the clarity of its exposition of the relationship between subject and object in Marxian theory.

"In order to combat a widespread misunderstanding, it must be stressed that the superstructure is real. Lenin in particular tended to overlook this, when he contrasted being and idea in his 'reflection theory'. The superstructure is no less real than its base. The terms 'reflection' and 'to reflect', which Engels was fond of using when he was discussing ideological superstructure, can be misleading; these terms are meant to indicate something about the relationship between base and superstructure, not to describe the superstructure itself. There are in fact two forms of reality: the material reality and the 'ideal' reality (ie, the reality of human ideas). Political and legal superstructure are as real as the base. Both are social relations consisting of human relationships. Both exist in the idea, both are also material realities. As Marx said in The Holy Family, 'The communist workers know full well that property, capital, money, wage labour etc. are in no way the mere creations of their imagination but are the extremely concrete and practical results of their own self-alienation', and the same is true of non-economic relationships. The reality of social ideas, then, forms a necessary and constituent part of the material reality of social relationships. Material relations are what they are only in conjunction with the ideas which correspond to them. The reality of both is expressed by their social efficacy."

Ideology and Superstructure also offered a critique of competing interpretations of Marxian thought, particularly that associated with Karl Kautsky and that with Max Adler.

== Influence ==
History has not been kind to Jakubowski. His one contribution is still read in certain small Marxist political currents, and occasionally touches the fringes of academic study, for example, a brief review in the journal Radical Philosophy by British philosopher Kate Soper.
