= Anne van Amstel =

Dutch writer (born 1974)

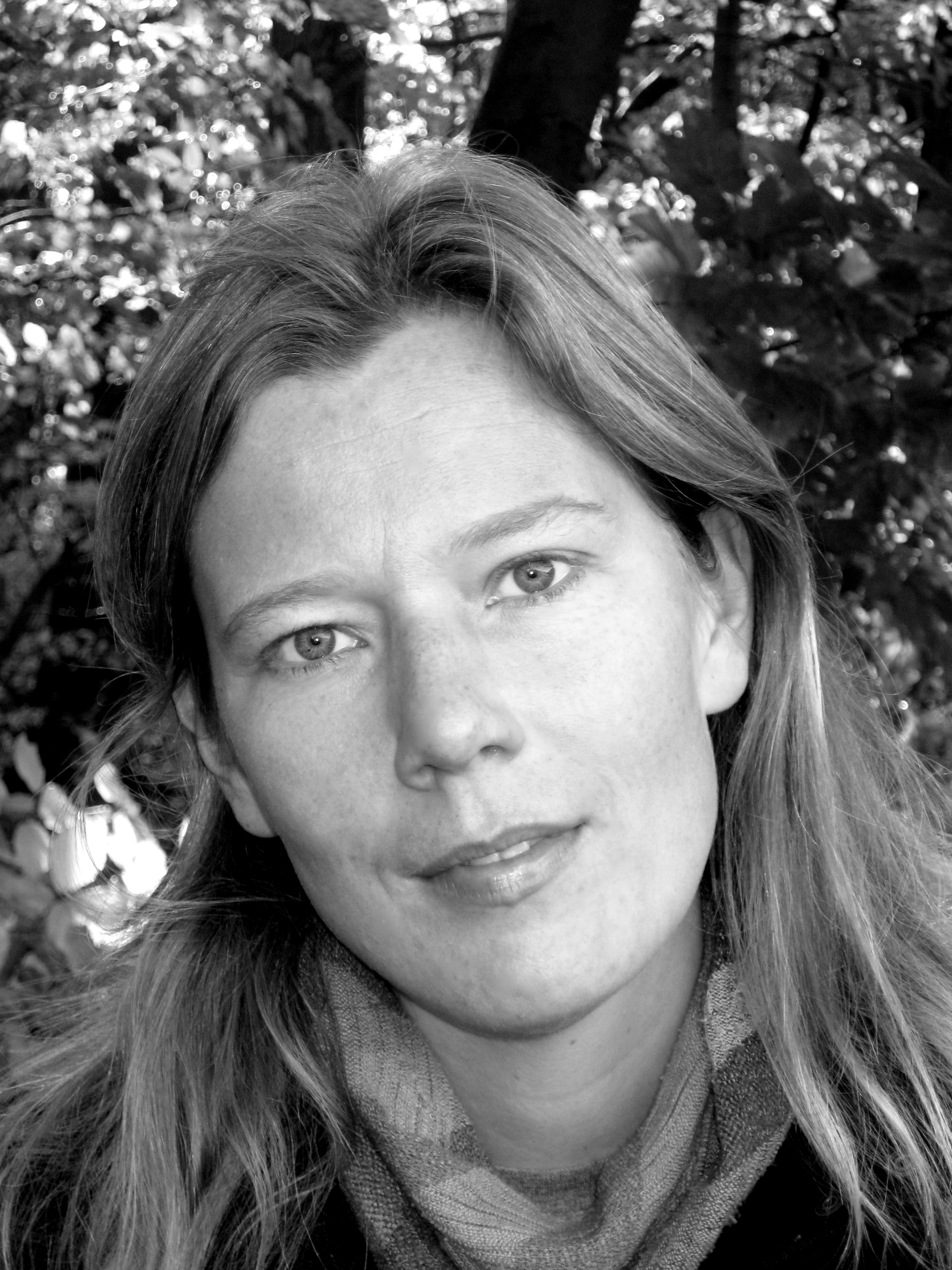
- Born: June 25, 1974 (age 50); Hoogeveen, Netherlands
- Genre: poetry

Anne van Amstel (born June 25, 1974) is a Dutch writer.

She was born in Hoogeveen and was educated at the Menso Alting College there, going on to study English literature and clinical psychology at the Vrije Universiteit Amsterdam. Van Amstel works part-time as a psychologist.

In 2004, she published her first poetry collection Het oog van de storm. In 2007, van Amstel was awarded first place for the VU-Podium Poëzieprijs. She has appeared at the Geen Daden Maar Woorden festival in Rotterdam, the Park & Poëzie festival in Middelburg, the Vurige Tongen festival in Ruigoord and the Dichters in de Prinsentuin festival in Groningen. In 2015, she received a scholarship awarded by the magazine Hollands Maandblad for the poetry category.
