= Hollands Maandblad =

Hollands Maandblad (formerly Hollands Weekblad) is a Dutch literary and political magazine founded by K. L. Poll.

== History ==
It was founded on 20 May 1959, as a weekly called Hollands Weekblad. Its founding editor was K. L. Poll, who for decades was also its only editor (he was also editor for the Algemeen Handelsblad, later merged into NRC Handelsblad). After 1962 the weekly became a monthly and was given its current title. Besides being known as a publication venue for beginning writers (Maarten Biesheuvel published his first story in the magazine), it is also a popular forum for essayists and politicians.

It shares many prose writers with Maatstaf.

== Subsidy and award ==
Like most Dutch literary magazines, it was initially subsidized by the government, but after 1997 this changed, when the advising agency thought the magazine was "too journalistic" and didn't generate enough discussion. The magazine continued without subsidy, but the subsidy was restored in 2004 after the magazine was judged to be trendsetting. In 2007 the magazine received an award from the Lucas-Ooms Fonds, an organization that promotes magazine journalism, as one of the most outstanding literary magazines.

== Editors ==
After the death of K.L. Poll, in 1990, the magazine was edited by J.J. Peereboom, who collaborated with Poll from the magazine's early days. At the end of 1994 an editorial team of four was instated, consisting of Peereboom, Marie-Anne van Wijnen, Maarten Doorman, and Bastiaan Bommeljé. In January 2001, the latter became the sole editor; he resigned in January 2019 and was succeeded by David Garvelink.

== Hollands Maandblad scholarships ==
Since 2004 the magazine awards scholarships to promising young writers of prose, poetry, and essays.

Year	Poetry	Prose	Essay
2002/2003	Cor Gordijn	Cathelijn Schilder	Megchel Doewina
2003/2004	Vrouwkje Tuinman	Yusef el Halal	Thomas Bersee
2004/2005	Froukje van der Ploeg	M.A.C. Paanakker	Esther ten Dolle
2005/2006	Floor Buschenhenke	Anke Scheeren	Margriet de Koning Gans
2006/2007	Annemieke Gerrist	Ilse Bos	Fredie Beckmans
2007/2008	Krijn Peter Hesselink	Thijs de Boer	not awarded
2008/2009	Vicky Francken	Ivo Bonthuis	Hans Hogenkamp
2009/2010	Iris Brunia	Nina Roos	not awarded
2010/2011	Emma Burns	Philip Huff	Krijn Peter Hesselink
2011/2012	Kira Wuck	Stephan ter Borg	Machiel Jansen
2012/2013	Esther Porcelijn	Bregje Hofstede	Maxim Roozen
2013/2014	Olga Kortz	Jochem van den Dijssel & Emma Burns & Olga Kortz	not awarded
2014/2015	Anne van Amstel & Marieke Lucas Rijneveld	Kitty Pouwels	not awarded
2015/2016	not awarded	Erik Wietse Rietkerk & Daniëlle van Versendaal & Pieter Kranenborg	not awarded
2016/2017	Jan-Willem Dijk	Gerda Blees	not awarded
2017/2018	Anne van Winkelhof	Renske van den Broek	not awarded
2018/2019	Dorien de Wit	Tjeerd Posthuma	not awarded
2019/2020	Johannes van der Sluis	not awarded	Kim Schoof
