= Joost Zwagerman =

Dutch writer, poet, and essayist

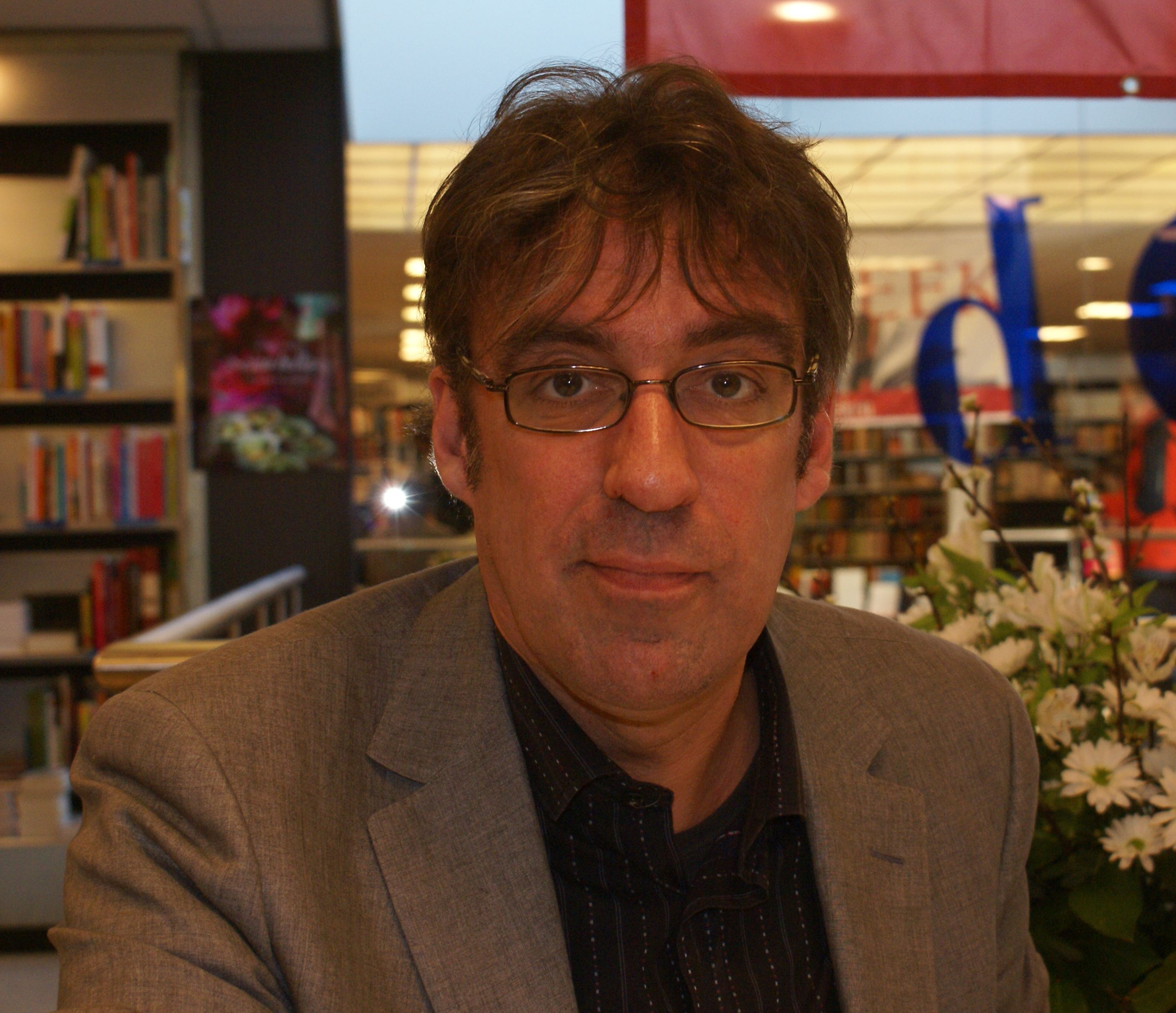
- Zwagerman in 2010
- Born: Johannes Jacobus Willebrordus Zwagerman; 18 November 1963; Alkmaar, Netherlands
- Died: 8 September 2015 (aged 51); Haarlem, Netherlands
- Occupations: Writer, poet, essayist
- Writing career
- Years active: 1986—2015
- Notable works: Gimmick! (1989), Vals licht (1991)
- Notable awards: Gouden Ganzenveer

Johannes Jacobus Willebrordus "Joost" Zwagerman (Dutch pronunciation: [joːst ˈsʋaːɣərmɑn]; 18 November 1963 – 8 September 2015) was a Dutch writer, poet and essayist. Among his teachers was the novelist Oek de Jong.

== Early life and education ==
Johannes Jacobus Willebrordus Zwagerman was born on 18 November 1963 in Alkmaar, Netherlands.

At the age of nine, Zwagerman compiled a magazine, De Zwagergids, of texts and images from TV magazines.

Zwagerman received his high-school education at the Rijksscholengemeenschap Noord-Kennemerland in Alkmaar, where he graduated from havo and moved on to study at the Pedagogische Academie. Afterwards he went on to study Dutch language (Nederlandse taal- en letterkunde, unfinished) He was a student at a course of creative writing by Oek de Jong.

== Work ==
Zwagerman started his literary career writing fiction that described the Netherlands in the later 20th-century. He made his debut with the novel De houdgreep in 1986. His second novel, Gimmick! (1989), was adapted as a play, and reached a much wider audience. He wrote his third book, False Light (Dutch: Vals licht), in 1991 and it was short listed for the AKO Literatuurprijs. Vals Licht was the basis for a movie by Theo van Gogh (1993). More novels followed, including Chaos en Rumoer, Zes Sterren and De buitenvrouw. Zwagerman's work has been translated into twelve languages, including German, French and Japanese.

Besides books, Zwagerman also published poetry and essays. His first collection of poems was published in 1987 Langs de doofpot. The Awater poetry prize was awarded for his most recent collection Roeshoofd hemelt, which was reprinted four times. Among his essay works are the Pornotheek Arcadië (2001) and Het vijfde seizoen (2003).

Zwagerman was also active as a columnist for Dutch newspapers, previously for de Volkskrant (1998–2002) and since 2001 for NRC Handelsblad. Additionally he was the host of a Dutch television programme (Zomergasten) and appeared in theater with the Dutch writer Ronald Giphart. Besides his work as a writer and columnist, he also frequently appeared on Dutch national television, in the program De Wereld Draait Door, broadcast by VARA, where he often held mini-lectures on art-related topics. As an amateur art lover himself, Zwagerman enjoyed transmitting his love for art to a wider audience.

As a writer Zwagerman was connected to two universities; in 1998 Rijksuniversiteit Groningen and 2003 Universiteit Leiden. He also lectured at the Radboud Universiteit Nijmegen during the Frans Kellendonk Lecture in 2006. In January 2008, Zwagerman was awarded the Gouden Ganzenveer, for his extraordinary contribution to the Dutch written culture.

Until his divorce, Joost Zwagerman lived with his wife and three children in Amsterdam. In December 2012, he settled in Haarlem.

== Death and legacy ==
On 8 September 2015, de Volkskrant confirmed that Zwagerman had died by suicide. He was 51 years old. He was found dead at his home in Haarlem. Suicide was the theme of his 2002 novel Six Stars. He had recently published The Museum of Light, an essay collection on art.

The Joost Zwagerman Lecture is an annual event held in honor of Zwagerman by Stedelijk Museum Alkmaar. It is also the venue for the Joost Zwagerman Essay Prize, given to the best essay that encourages critical thinking on a topic chosen each year. The prize is hosted by the van Bijlevelt Foundation and has a prize of €7,500.

== Bibliography ==
- 1986 – De houdgreep, roman
- 1987 – Kroondomein, verhalen
- 1987 – Langs de doofpot, gedichten
- 1988 – De ziekte van jij, gedichten
- 1989 – Gimmick!, roman
- 1991 – Vals licht, roman
- 1993 – Collega's van God, essays
- 1993 – De kus van Michael Jackson, columns
- 1993 – De mooiste vrouw ter wereld, gedichten
- 1994 – De buitenvrouw, roman
- 1996 – Tomaatsj, novelle
- 1996 – In het wild. Essays en kritieken
- 1997 – Chaos en rumoer, roman
- 1998 – Het jongensmeisje, verhalen
- 2000 – Pornotheek Arcadië, essays
- 2001 – Bekentenissen van de pseudomaan, gedichten
- 2001 – Landschap met klein vuil, columns
- 2002 – Zes sterren, roman
- 2003 – Het wilde westen, columns
- 2003 – Het vijfde seizoen, essays
- 2004 – Tussen droom en daad in Dubbelstad: Alkmaar in feit en fictie
- 2005 – Roeshoofd hemelt, gedichten
- 2005 – Door eigen hand. Zelfmoord en de nabestaanden, essays en interviews
- 2005 – De Nederlandse en Vlaamse literatuur vanaf 1880 in 250 verhalen, bloemlezing
- 2005 – Tot hier en zelfs verder, de vroege gedichten
- 2006 – Perfect Day en andere popverhalen
- 2006 – Transito, essays
- 2006 – De Nederlandse en Vlaamse literatuur vanaf 1880 in 60 lange verhalen, bloemlezing
- 2007 – De schaamte voor links, pamphlet
- 2007 – Hollands welvaren, non fictie ISBN 978-90-295-6586-8
- 2007 – De ontdekking van de literatuur. The Paris Review Interviews, bloemlezing
- 2008 – De Nederlandse en Vlaamse literatuur vanaf 1880 in 200 essays, bloemlezing
- 2009 – Hitler in de polder & Vrij van God, pamphlet
- 2010 – Duel (novel), Boekenweekgeschenk 2010
- 2016 – The Penguin Book of Dutch Short Stories, anthology
- 2016 – Americana : een keuze uit zijn omzwervingen in de Amerikaanse cultuur, essays over Amerikaanse cultuur, schrijvers en kunstenaars.ISBN 978-90-295-0688-5
