= Simone Dubois =

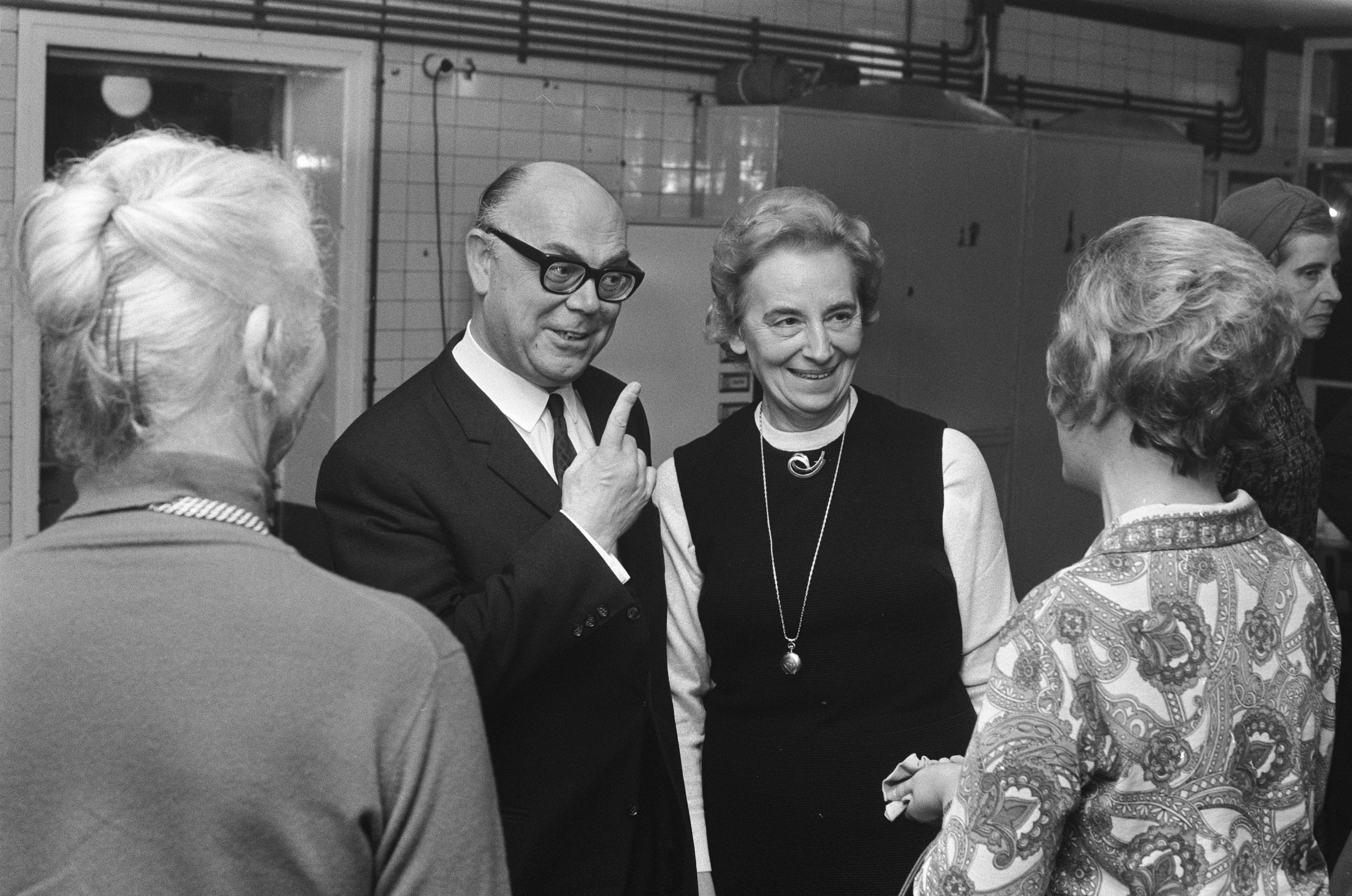
- Simone with her husband, Pierre Dubois, in 1969
- Born: Simonna Anna Gabriella Charlotta de Bruyn; 29 April 1910; Ghent, Belgium
- Died: 5 April 2001 (aged 90); The Hague, The Netherlands
- Citizenship: Netherlands; Belgium
- Occupations: Writer; translator; researcher
- Spouse: Pierre Dubois (m. 1943; died 1999)

Simone Dubois (29 April 1910 – 5 April 2001) was a Belgian translator, writer and researcher who lived and worked mainly in the Netherlands. She became known in particular for research into and translations of the work of Belle van Zuylen, of whom she wrote two biographies. Dubois devoted 40 years of her life to this French-language writer.

== Biography ==
Dubois' parents were bilingual and non-religious. Dubois went to the girls' high school in Ghent, humanities department. Because of her poor health, she did not continue her studies. When Dubois' family moved to Brussels, she studied at the fashion academy. She also took an evening course in stenography and at the age of twenty went to work as a secretary at the Hollandsch Weekblad, a periodical intended for Dutch people living in Belgium, for which she managed the administration and advertisements.

With the German invasion of Belgium (1940), Dubois went to work as a volunteer for the directorate-general of the Red Cross. She continued to do so throughout the war. She also worked for the Belgian women's movement YWCA, which delivered letters to soldiers in the city.

In 1942, she met the writer Pierre H. Dubois, whom she married on 12 June 1943. Dubois became the mother of two sons. She worked with her husband, who was also a journalist. Although she positioned herself as the wife of the writer Dubois, Simone Dubois considered the emancipation of women to be ‘the most important development in the [twentieth] century’. They had lived in the Netherlands since 1949.

== Work ==
Dubois translated work by the French writer Françoise Sagan. In addition, Dubois wrote in Dutch and French for the publisher of the magazine Libelle, also based in Haarlem.

When her children were adults, she began to do even more research and wrote more often. In 1952, after a suggestion from her husband she discovered the work of Belle van Zuylen (1740–1805), the Dutch writer who wrote in French, after reading a biography by Philippe Godet. She wrote a biography of Van Zuylen herself (published in 1969), and translated her work, among other things the anthology of letters Rebels en beminnelijk (published in 1971).

Publisher G.A. van Oorschot wanted to publish the Collected Works and the biography of Belle van Zuylen with a subsidy from the Netherlands Organisation for Scientific Research. However, the subsidy application was rejected twice. The Dubois couple had no academic education. On the advice of Leendert Brummel, emeritus professor of Library Science at the University of Amsterdam, Dubois became a member of the 18th Century Working Group in February 1970 in order to get to know other people interested in Van Zuylen, better known in French by her married name as Isabelle de Charrière. In September 1973, Dubois became secretary of this working group. With the working group, she organised the international congress Actualité d'Isabelle de Charrière in Zuylen Castle in September 1974. This led to the creation of the international editorial team, of which Simone Dubois was general secretary, which ultimately led to the publication of the collected works of Belle van Zuylen in 10 volumes on thin paper in the period 1979–1984. Simone and Pierre Dubois were members of the editorial team of this publication by publisher Van Oorschot. With this, Simone Dubois became 'the driving force behind the development of Belle de Zuylen's work'.

In 1974, Simone and Pierre Dubois also co-founded the Belle de Zuylen Society with the annual magazine Lettre de Zuylen, the first edition of which was published in 1976. In 1990, she and her husband retired as board members of the Belle de Zuylen Society to fully focus on writing the biography.

In 1984, Dubois published an article about Anna Maria van Schurman.

Eventually, together with her husband, she wrote the more extensive biography of Belle van Zuylen, Zonder Vaandel (published 1993), based on the Collected Works and their research. Dubois was already 83 years old at the time. This biography became a success and ended up on bestseller lists.

When her husband died in 1999, she mainly took care of his literary legacy.
