= Oldeberkoop =

- Village
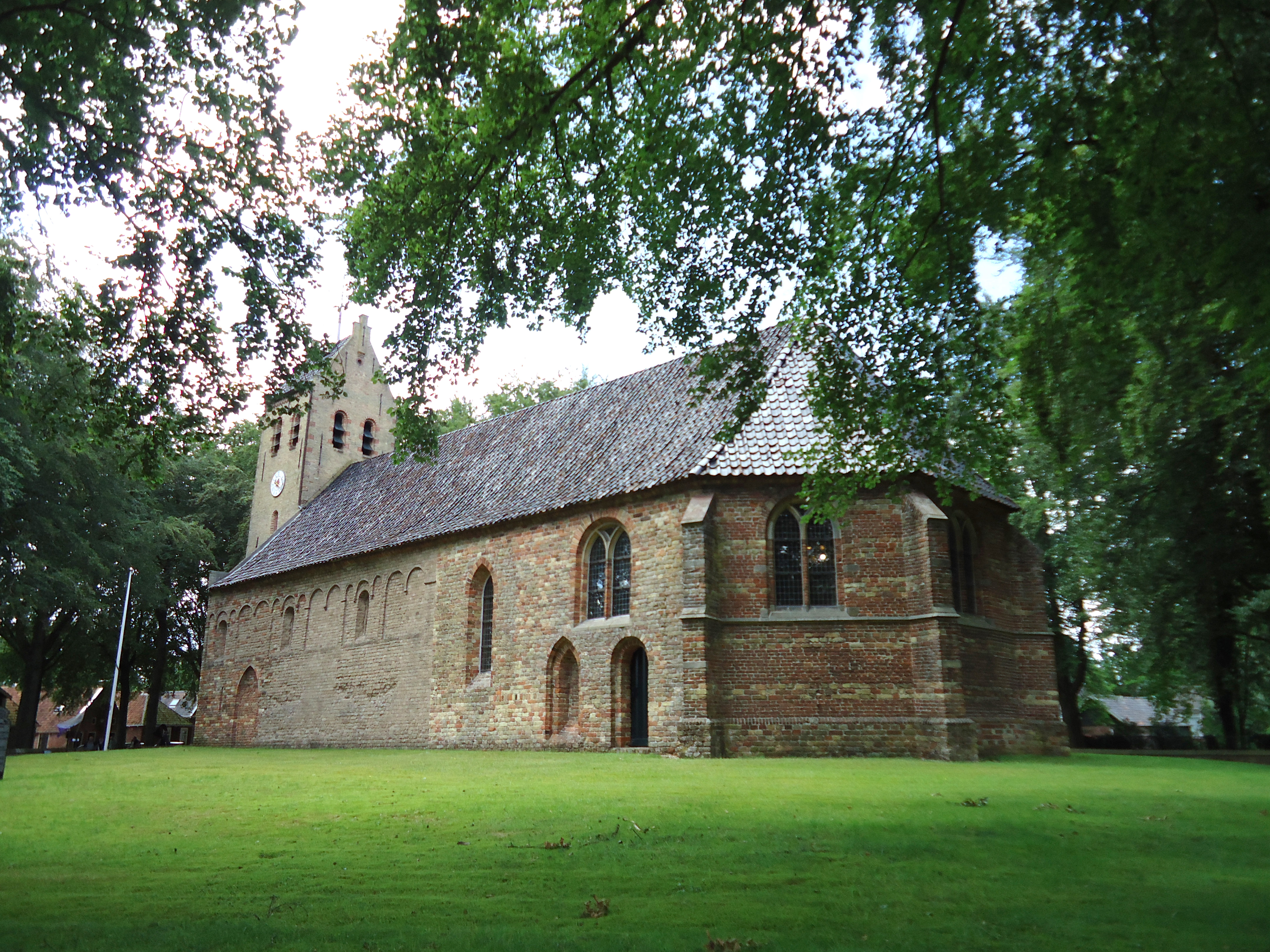
- Bonifatius Church of Oldeberkoop

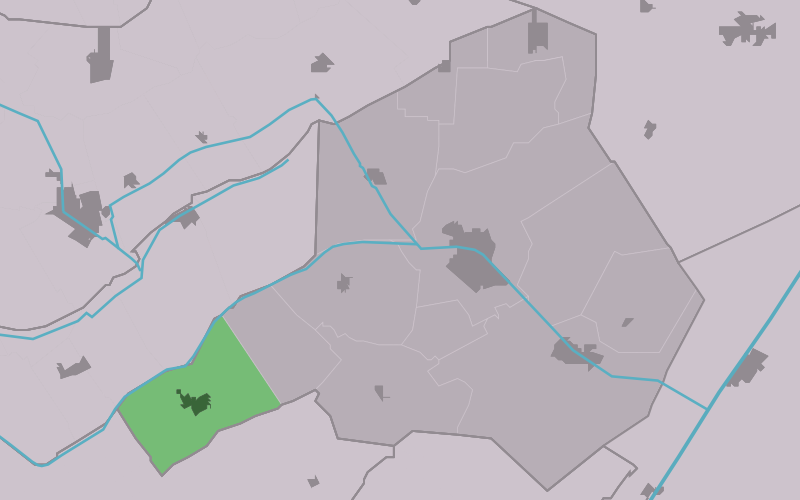
- Location in Ooststellingwerf municipality

- Location in the Netherlands Oldeberkoop (Netherlands)
- Country: Netherlands
- Province: Friesland
- Municipality: Ooststellingwerf

Area
  - Total: 18.34 km^{2} (7.08 sq mi)
- Elevation: 3 m (9.8 ft)

Population (2021)
  - Total: 1,570
  - Density: 85.6/km^{2} (222/sq mi)
- Time zone: UTC+1 (CET)
  - Summer (DST): UTC+2 (CEST)
- Postal code: 8421
- Dialing code: 0516
- Website: Official

Oldeberkoop (Dutch pronunciation: [ˌɔldəbərˈkoːp]; West Frisian: Aldeberkeap [ˌɔːdəbəˈkɪəp]) is a village consisting of about 1,580 inhabitants in the municipality of Ooststellingwerf in the east of Friesland, the Netherlands.

== History ==
The village was first mentioned between 1232 and 1233 as apud Brokope. Olde (old) was added to distinguish between Nijeberkoop. The etymology of -berkoop is unclear. The village developed around the church and brink (communal pasture). The Dutch Reformed church dates from the 12th century, and was enlarged in the 14th century. In 1585, the tower collapsed and was replaced in 1608.

Oldeberkoop was attacked by Spanish troops in 1585. To better protect the village, a sconce was constructed in 1593 along the Linde River. In 1672, the sconce was attacked by a combined force of France and the Prince-Bishopric of Münster, but was not conquered.

Oldeberkoop was the capital of the municipality of Ooststellingwer until 1848. It was home to 646 people in 1840.

== Gallery ==
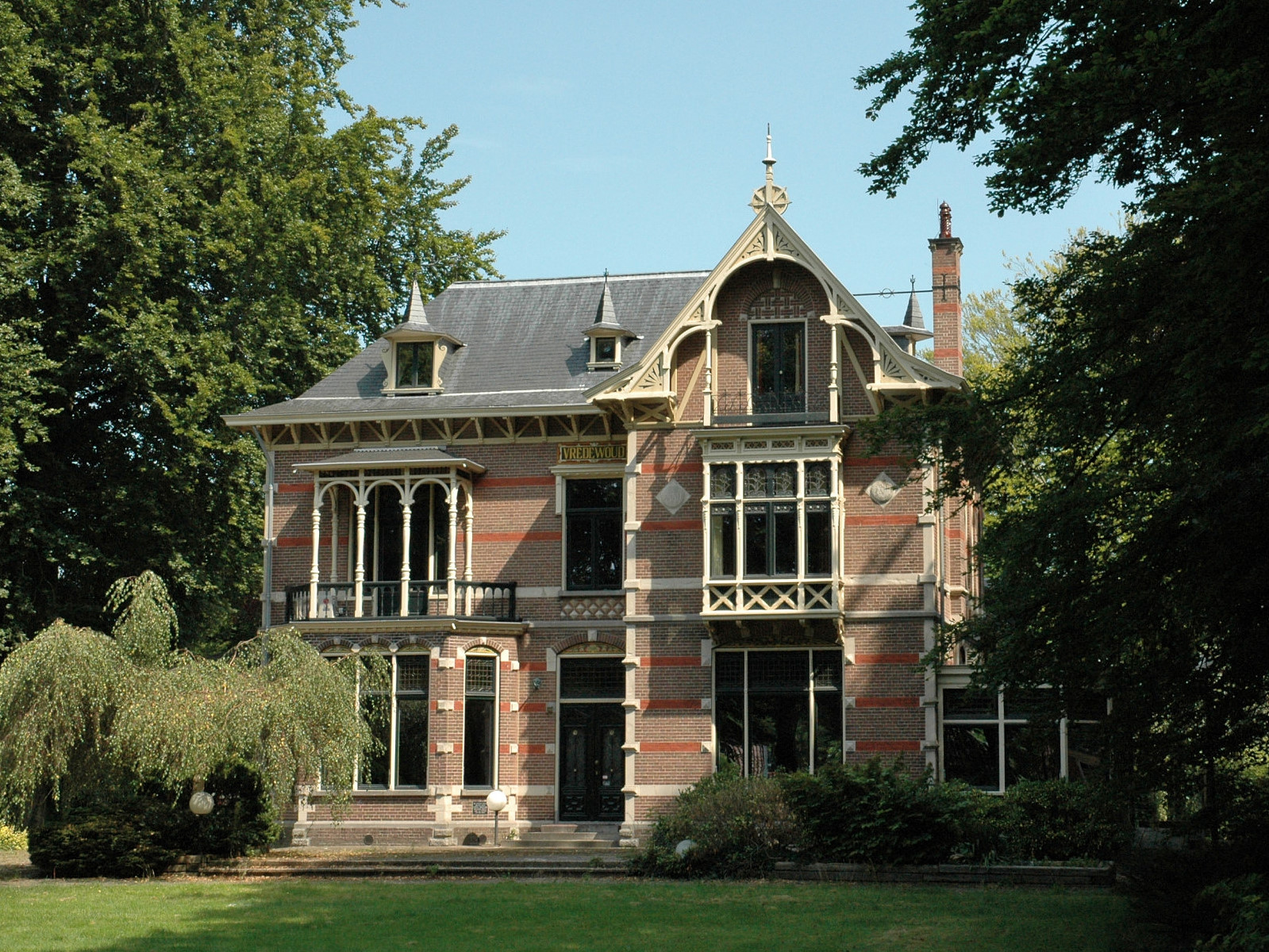
Huis Vredewoud

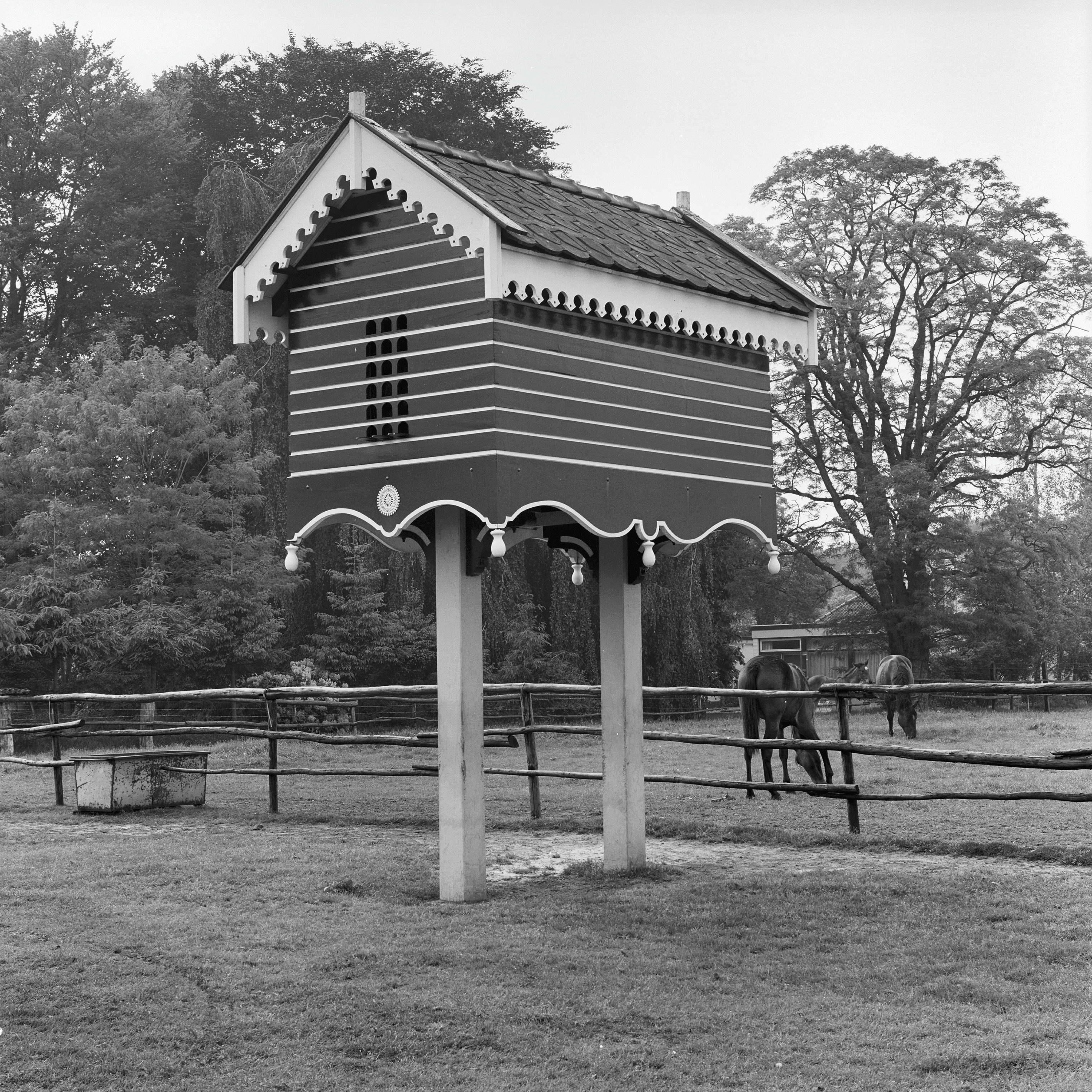
Dovecote in Oldeberkoop

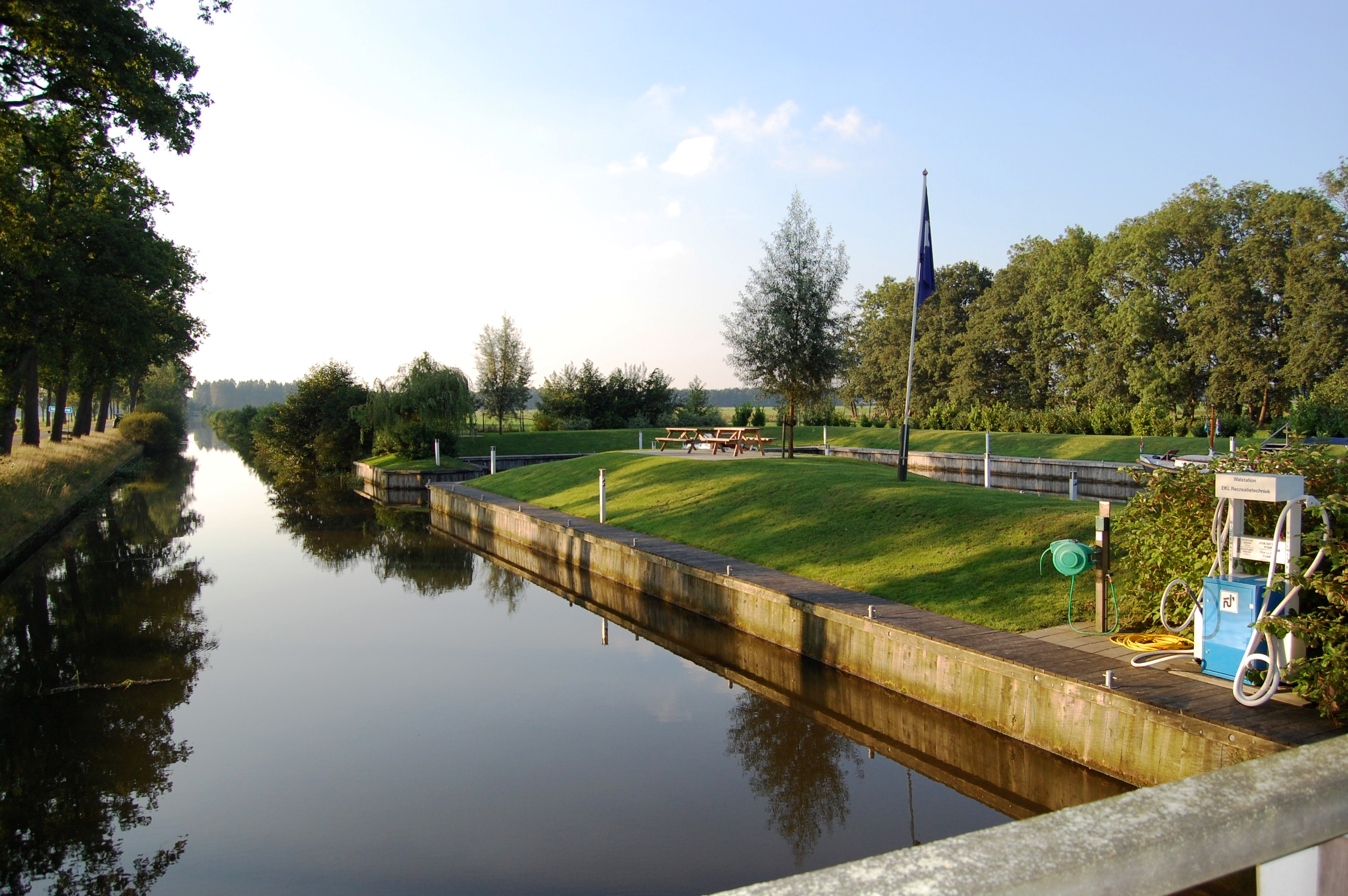
Canal view

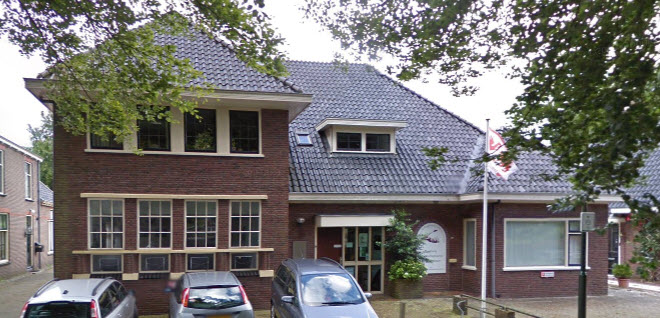
Office building
