= Bregje Hofstede =

Dutch journalist

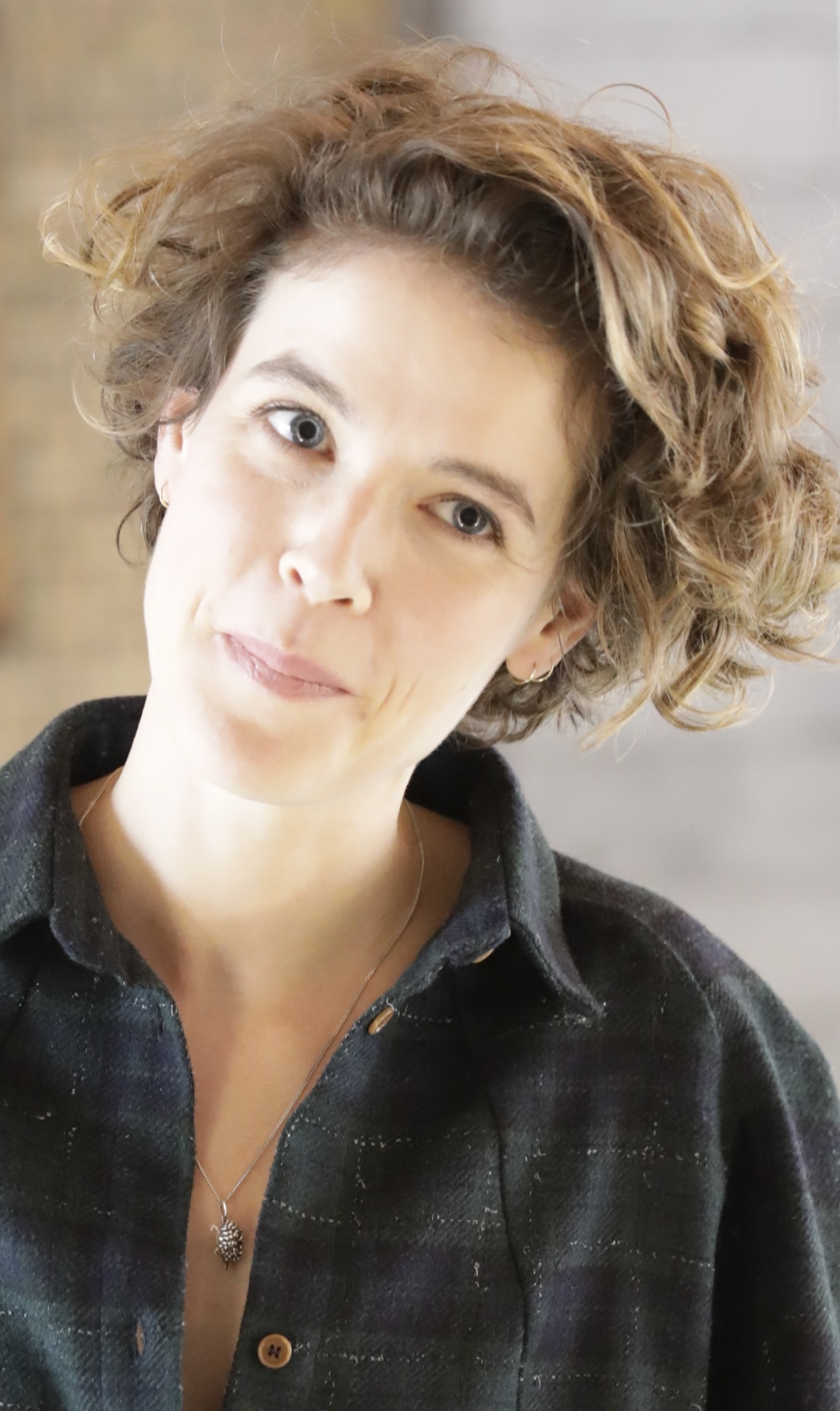
- Hofstede in 2022
- Born: 1988 (age 36–37)
- Occupation: journalist

Bregje Hofstede (born 1988) is a Dutch journalist, columnist and writer.

== Career ==
Hofstede studied art history and French in Utrecht, Paris and Berlin. She writes for various newspapers and literary magazines, including a column on "New Feminism" for De Correspondent. Bregje Hofstede is co-founder of the feminist action group De Bovengrondse (in English: "The Aboveground").

Her debut novel De hemel boven Parijs (German title: "Der Himmel über Paris"), published in 2014, was nominated for several literary prizes (including Libris Literatuur). Libris Literatuur Prijs, Anton Wachterprijs, Gouden Boekenuil) and translated into Danish and German.

Her second book, the essay collection De herontdekking van het lichaam (German title: "The Rediscovery of the Body"), was published in 2016.

Her second novel, Drift (German title: "Verlangen"), was published in 2018 and was shortlisted for the prestigious Libris Literatuur Prijs.

In Slaap vatten (German title: Schlaf finden), her third non-fiction book, the author deals with the phenomenon of sleep(ing). Her latest novel has the title Oersoep and was published in 2023.

== Works ==
- De hemel boven Parijs. Cossee 2014, ISBN 978-90-5936-741-8 (novel)
  - The sky over Paris. C.H. Beck 2015, ISBN 978-3-406-68343-5, translated by Heike Baryga
- De herontdekking van het lichaam: over de burn-out. Cossee 2016, ISBN 978-90-5936-694-7 (volume of essays)
  - The rediscovery of the body Verlag Freies Geistesleben 2020, ISBN 978-3-7725-3018-0, translated by Christiane Burkhardt and Janine Malz
- Drift. Das Mag 2018, ISBN 978-94-92478-71-9 (novel)
  - Desire. Verlag Freies Geistesleben 2020, ISBN 978-3-7725-3019-7, translated by Christiane Burkhardt
- Bergje: een wandeling. Series "Terloops", Van Oorschot 2020, ISBN 978-90-282-1033-2 (travel story)
  - Bergje. Strangers Press 2020, ISBN 978-1-911343-29-5, translated by Alice Tetley-Paul
- Slaap vatten. Hoe een slapeloze de nacht terugwon. Das Mag 2021, ISBN 978-94-93168-07-7 (literary sleep guide)
- Oersoep. Das Mag, 13 oktober 2023, ISBN 978-94-93399-04-4
