= Pierre H. Dubois =

Dutch writer and critic

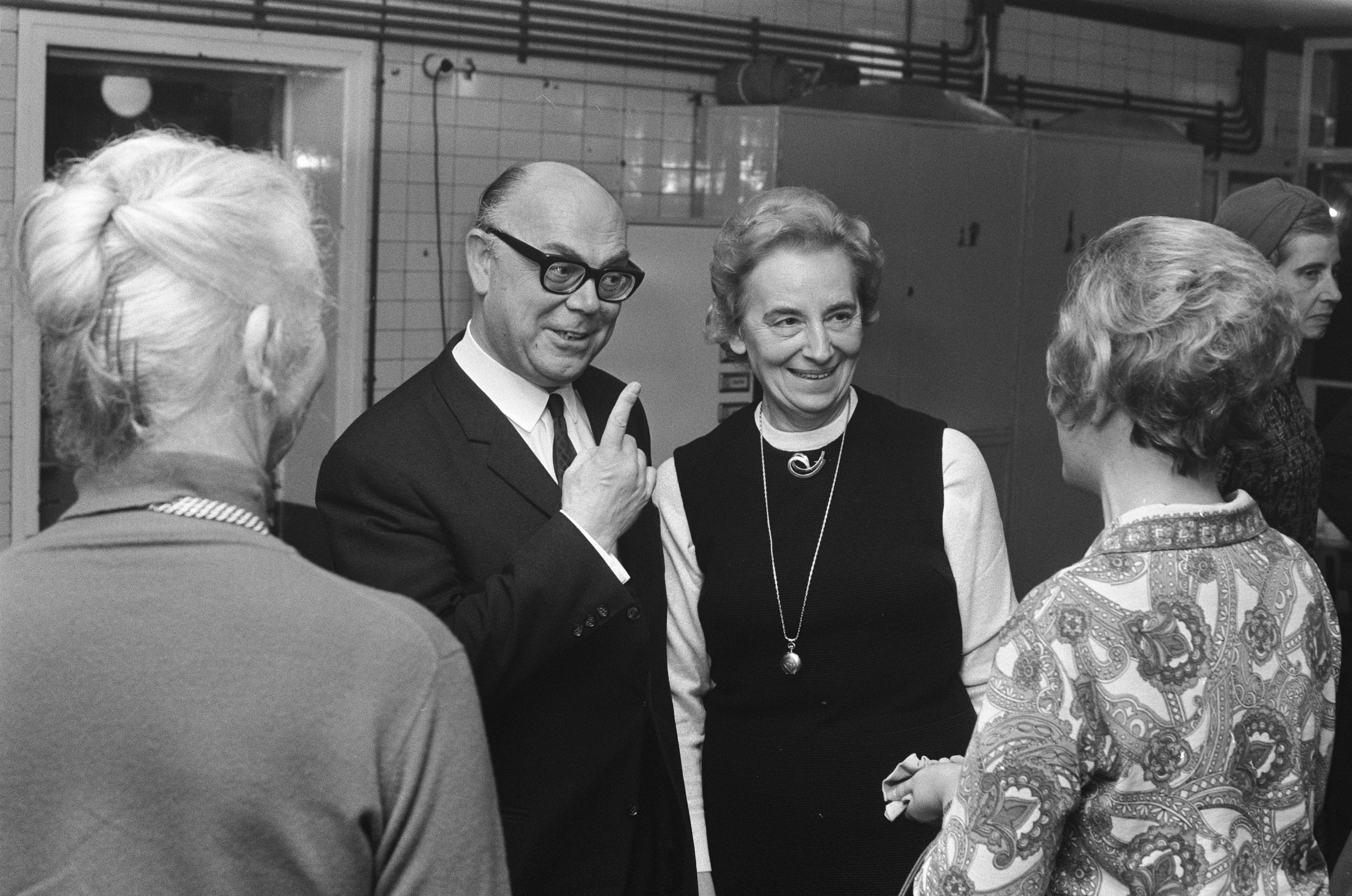
Pierre Dubois and his wife Simone de Bruyn (1969)

Pierre H. Dubois (born Amsterdam, 2 July 1917 – died The Hague, 24 March 1999) was a Dutch writer and critic. He was awarded the Constantijn Huygens Prize in 1952, for Een houding in de tijd, and again in 1985.

== Works ==
- 1940 - A.C. Willink
- 1941 - In den vreemde
- 1942 - Het gemis
- 1945 - De semaphoor
- 1947 - Quia absurdum
- 1950 - Een houding in de tijd
- 1952 - Een vinger op de lippen
- 1953 - De ontmoeting
- 1953 - F. Bordewijk
- 1954 - Voor eigen rekening
- 1955 - Facetten van de Nederlandse poëzie
- 1956 - Ademhalen
- 1958 - In staat van beschuldiging
- 1960 - Jan van Nijlen
- 1964 - Marcellus Emants, een schrijversleven
- 1966 - Het geheim van Antaios
- 1966 - Maurice Gilliams
- 1966 - Zonder echo
- 1968 - Het binnenste buiten
- 1970 - Zomeravond in een kleine stad
- 1971 - Mettertijd
- 1972 and 1977 - Schrijvers in hun landschap
- 1976 - De verleiding van Gogol
- 1977 - Spinrag van tijd
- 1978 - Over Allard Pierson
- 1978 - Over Simenon
- 1982 - Najaar
- 1984 - Een toren van Babel
- 1984 - Requiem voor een verleden tijd
- 1985 - Kaleidoscopie van een acteur
- 1986 - De angst van Belisarius
- 1987 - Memoranda 1 - Hermetisch en besterd
- 1988 - Memoranda 2 - Retour Amsterdam-Brussel (1942–1952)
- 1989 - Memoranda 3 -Een soort van geluk (1952–1980)
- 1993 - Frans van stijl, Nederlands van karakter, universeel van geest
- 1993 - Zonder vaandel, biografie Belle van Zuylen, met Simone Dubois
- 1994 - J. C. Bloem, dichter van het onuitsprekelijke
- 1997 - Over de grens van de tijd
