= Campert =

Campert is a surname. Notable people with the surname include:

- Remco Campert (1929–2022), Dutch author, poet, and columnist
- Jan Campert (1902–1943), Dutch author
