= Willy Corsari =

Dutch novelist and actor

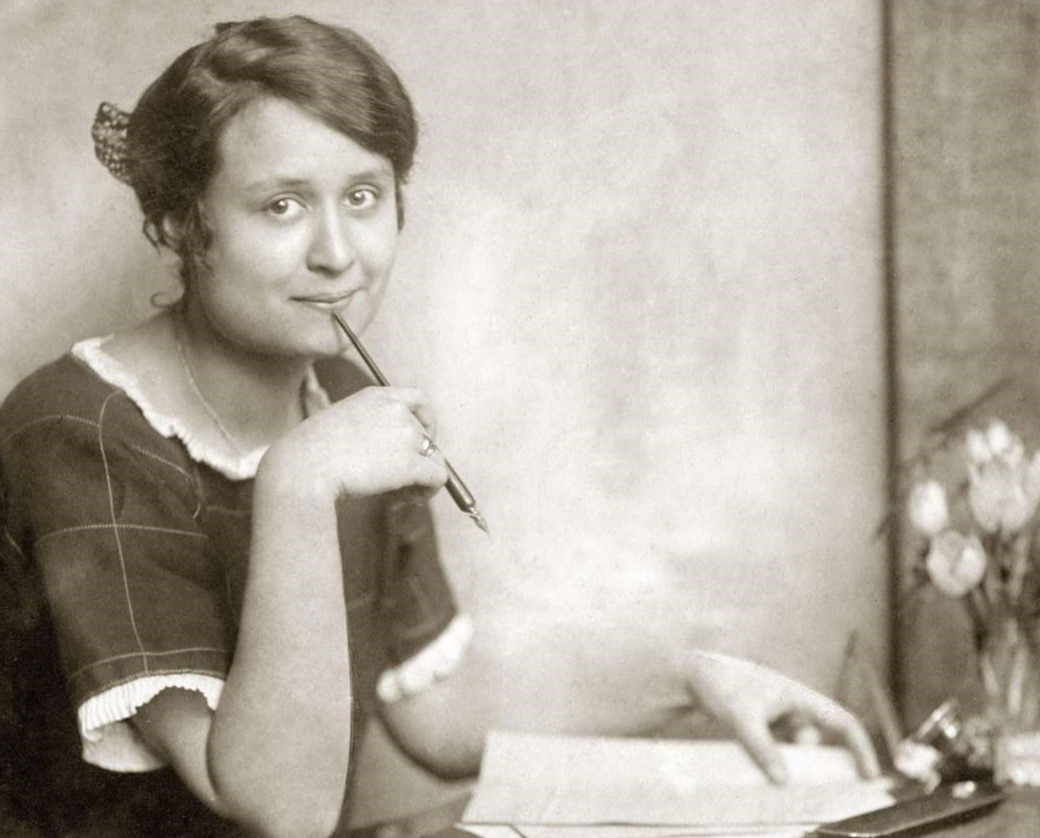
- Portrait of Willy Corsari in 1921
- Born: Wilhelmina Angela Schmidt; 26 December 1897; Jette, Belgium
- Died: 11 May 1998 (aged 100); Amstelveen, Netherlands
- Spouse(s): Antoni Ewoud Sichterman, Hendrik Willem Cornelis Douwens
- Children: Paul Ewoud Sichterman
- Writing career
- Language: Dutch
- Genres: Cabaret, Children's fiction, Detective fiction
- Notable awards: Knight of the Order of Orange-Nassau

Signature
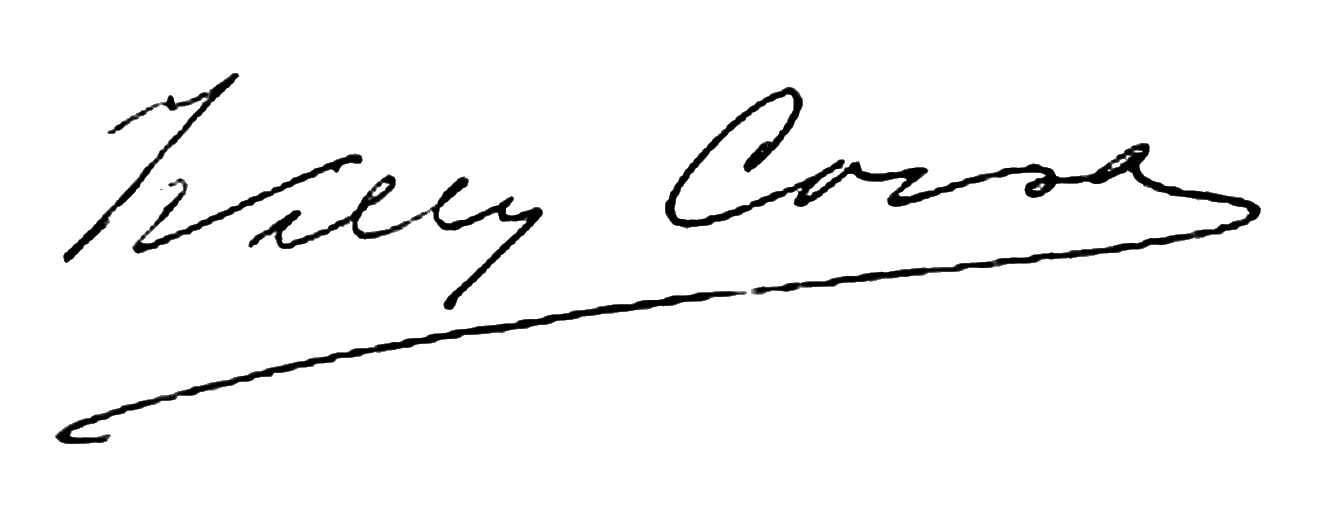

Wilhelmina Angela Schmidt (26 December 1897 – 11 May 1998), known by her stage name and pen name Willy Corsari, was a Dutch writer, actress and composer. She is noted for her detective fiction and has been termed the Dutch Agatha Christie. Born in Jette, a municipality of Brussels, the daughter of a singer and a musician, she spent an itinerant childhood living in the Dutch East Indies, Germany and the Netherlands. Corsari developed as a writer at an early age, being first published at age ten. In 1914, she had her musical debut at the cabaret De Kattebel, performing on stage until 1932. At the same time, she developed her writing career.

In 1927, she published her first three books, including Misdaad zonder Fouten (Crime without Mistakes). Many more followed. She also produced plays for the stage and radio, and, in 1972 an album of songs that she wrote and composed entitled Liedjes in de Schemer (Songs in the Twilight). During the Second World War, she gave a German deserter refuge and was consequentially imprisoned in Scheveningen, although released due to insufficient evidence. After the war, Corsari continued to publish and reached a peak in 1958 with over 200,000 copies of her omnibus sold in a year. She continued to write, producing Spelen met de dood (Playing with Death) in 1983, although by that time her output had reduced to very low levels. She was made a Knight of the Order of Orange-Nassau in 1990 and died in Amstelveen in 1998.

== Biography ==
Wilhelmina Angela Schmidt was born in Jette, a municipality of Brussels in Belgium, on 26 December 1897. Schmidt came from an artistic family. Her father, Cornelis Nicolaas Schmidt, was a singer and sculptor who used the stage name Corsari, and her mother. Elisabeth Christina Benit, was also a musician. She grew up travelling, living in The Hague, the Dutch East Indies, Amsterdam and Berlin. Her schooling was disrupted by a bout of malaria, but her father took advantage of this by ensuring she had music lessons on the piano as well as instruction from his singing teacher, Mrs. Ypes-Speet while they were in Berlin. Her talent at writing became evident early in her life and she had her first story published in the newspaper Het Volk at the age of ten. Before the First World War, she had her work published in the news magazines De Groene Amsterdammer and Haagsche Post, and the literary magazine Nederland.

Schmidt's father had destined her to be an opera singer. However, she demonstrated a preference to cabaret, for which her voice was more suited, and she made her debut in 1914 at Jean-Louis Pisuisse's De Kattebel, adopting the stage name Willy Corsari. She started singing with the company full-time in 1917 and, in 1925, went on tour to Borneo, appearing as a headline act. She sang in Dutch and German. Returning to the Netherlands, she continued to pursue her singing career with increasing success, while at the same time also resuming her writing. In 1927, she published her first three books, the children's book Bobbed en shingled (Bobbed and Shingled), the novel Chimaera (Chimera) for adults and her first detective novel Misdaad zonder fouten (Crime Without Fault). The last genre was to become particularly important for her. The children's story was named for the bob cut hairstyle. From this point on, writing increasingly took over from music as the focus of her time. Sometimes they complemented each other. For example, she would use her experience of cabaret to inform her writing. Nummers (Numbers) is a story set in the German cabaret world, which she wrote while in Berlin in the 1920s but was published in 1932. It was also in 1932 that she retired from singing cabaret to concentrate on writing. As well as novels and children's stories, she wrote stage plays and radio drama as well as translating works from Danish, English, French and Norwegian.

In 1939, her son migrated to South Africa and she moved to Amsterdam to live in a boarding house. During the Second World War she hid a German deserter in her home. He was discovered and she was sent to prison in Scheveningen in 1943. While in prison, she sang to entertain her fellow inmates and, although she was released due to a lack of evidence, this was the last time she felt able to sing to others. She waited until the end of the war before resuming publishing, unwilling to support the occupying forces. Her popularity increased and, by 1958, she was a best-selling author with more than 200,000 copies of her omnibus alone being bought by the public each year. In 1961 she moved to Amstelveen, but frequently visited her son in South Africa. She was critical of the increasing impact of apartheid she saw there. In 1972, her work found a new outlet when the album Liedjes in de schemer (Songs in the Twilight), containing songs she had both written and composed, was released. The same year saw the publication of Liedjes en herinneringen (Songs and Memories), which contained reminiscences of her time in cabaret.

Her writing proved very popular outside the Netherlands as well as in the local market, and has been translated into Afrikaans, Hebrew, Danish, English, French, Frisian, German, Hebrew, Hungarian, Norwegian, Spanish and Swedish. She has been called the Dutch Agatha Christie, due to the popularity of her detective novels, and characters like Inspector Robert Lund. Lund, introduced in 1934, became an archetype of the Dutch detective in popular culture. Her writing reflected a wide range of themes, from her experience in Amsterdam during the Second World War in Die van ons (Those of us) to euthanasia in De man zonder uniform (The Man Without a Uniform).

In 1990, Corsari was made a Knight of the Order of Orange-Nassau. She died on 11 May 1998 in Amstelveen at the age of 100.

== Selected writing ==
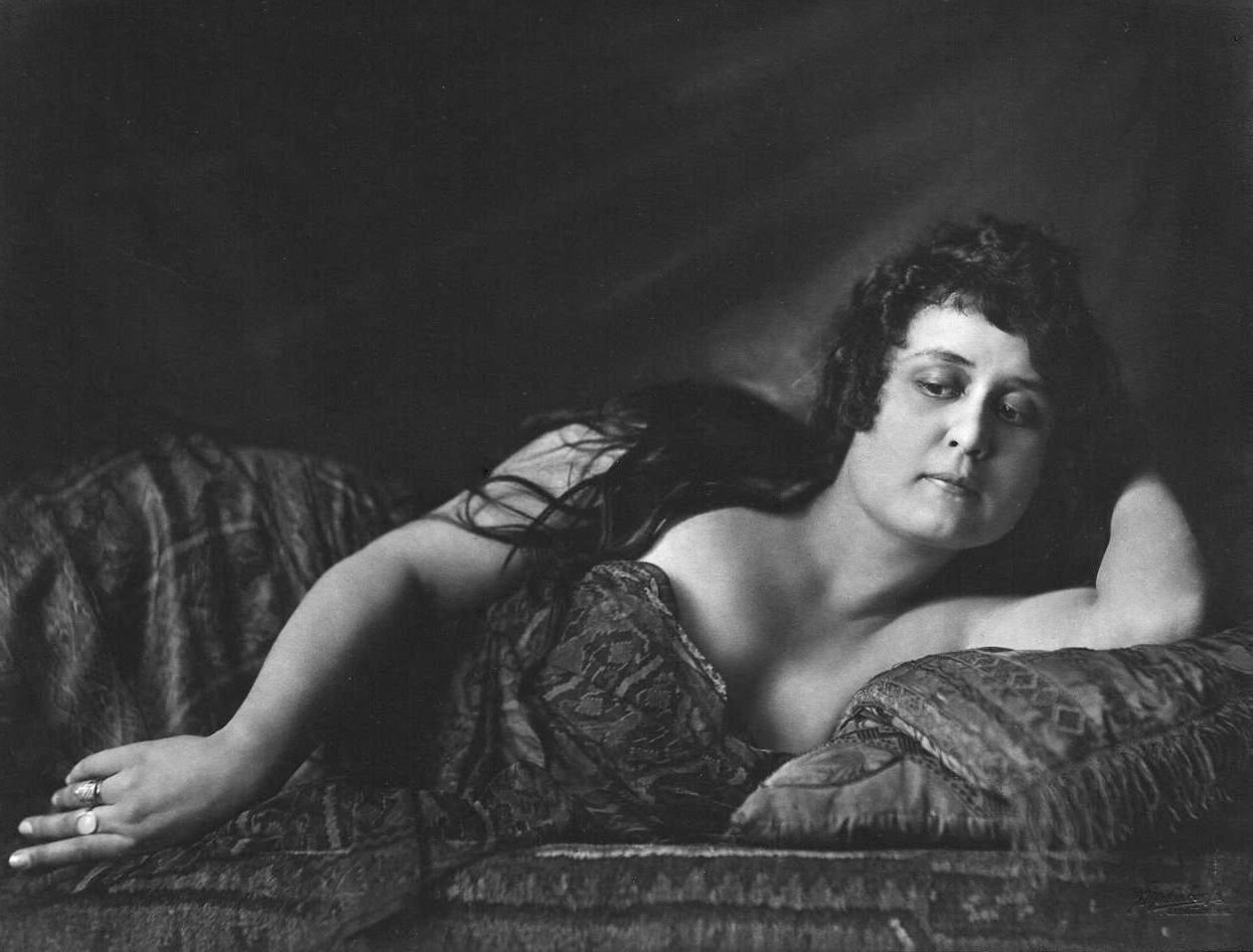
Willy Corsari, by Jacob Merkelbach

Corsari wrote over thirty books, published over fifty years, including the following:

- Bobbed en shingled (Bobbed and Shingled) (1927)
- De Misdaad zonder fouten (Crime Without Fault) (1927)
- Chimaera (Chimera) (1927)
- De onbekende medespeler (The Unknown Fellow Actor) (1929)
- Gestalten in den spiegel (Shapes in the Mirror) (1930)
- De zonden van Laurian Ostar (The Sins of Laurian Ostar) (1931)
- Nummers (Numbers) (1932)
- De man zonder uniform (The Man Without a Uniform) (1933)
- Klokslag twaalf (Twelve Clock) with Jan Campert (1933)
- Terugkeer tot Thera (Return to Thera) (1934)
- Het Mysterie van de Mondscheinsonate (The Mystery of the Moon) (1934)
- Binnen drie dagen (Within Three Days) (1935)
- Alleen maar Peter (Just Peter) (1935)
- De weg naar Scutari (The Road to Scutari) (1936)
- Voetstappen op de trap (Footsteps on the stairs) (1937)
- Een expres stopte (An Express Stop) (1938)
- Schip zonder haven (Ship without a port) (1938)
- Doden dansen niet (Do Not Dance Dead) (1939)
- Een gast in uw huis (A guest in your House) (1940)
- De weddenschap van inspecteur Lund (The Bet of Inspector Lund) (1941)
- Die van ons (Those of Us) (1945)
- De man die niet mocht terugkeren (The Man who was not Allowed to Return) (1947)
- De schorpioen (The Scorpion) (1948)
- Geliefde dwaas (Beloved Foo) (1949)
- Deze ene voorstelling (This One Performance) (1951)
- Illusies (Illusions) (1953)
- Moorden en marionetten (Murders and Puppets) (1955)
- Charles en Charlotte (Charles and Charlotte) (1956)
- De man die er niet was (The Man Who Wasn't There) (1959)
- De demon in de spiegel (The Demon in the Mirror) (1960)
- Kinderen en minnaars (Children and Lovers) (1961)
- Door een noodlottig ongeval (Due to a Fatal Accident) (1963)
- De bittere wijn (The Bitter Wine) (1966)
- Oude mensen hebben geheimen (Old People Have Secrets) (1968)
- Isabelle (Isabelle) (1971)
- Liedjes en herinneringen (Songs and Memories) (1972)
- Spelen met de dood (Playing with Death) (1983)

== Personal life ==
Corsari married Antoni Ewoud Sichterman in 1919, and had a son, named Paul Ewoud, the same year. The couple divorced in 1925. She subsequently married Hendrik Willem Cornelis Douwens to retain custody of her son, but her new husband died in 1931, leaving her a widow. She subsequently had a relationship with Jan Campert, who was at the time married. She accused him of stealing her silverware, for which he was detained. Although Campert separated from his wife, saying that he would rather be with Corsari, their relationship ended after two years. She never remarried. In 1950, she started exploring the Catholic Church and became a member in 1952.
