= Remco Campert =

Dutch writer and poet (1929–2022)

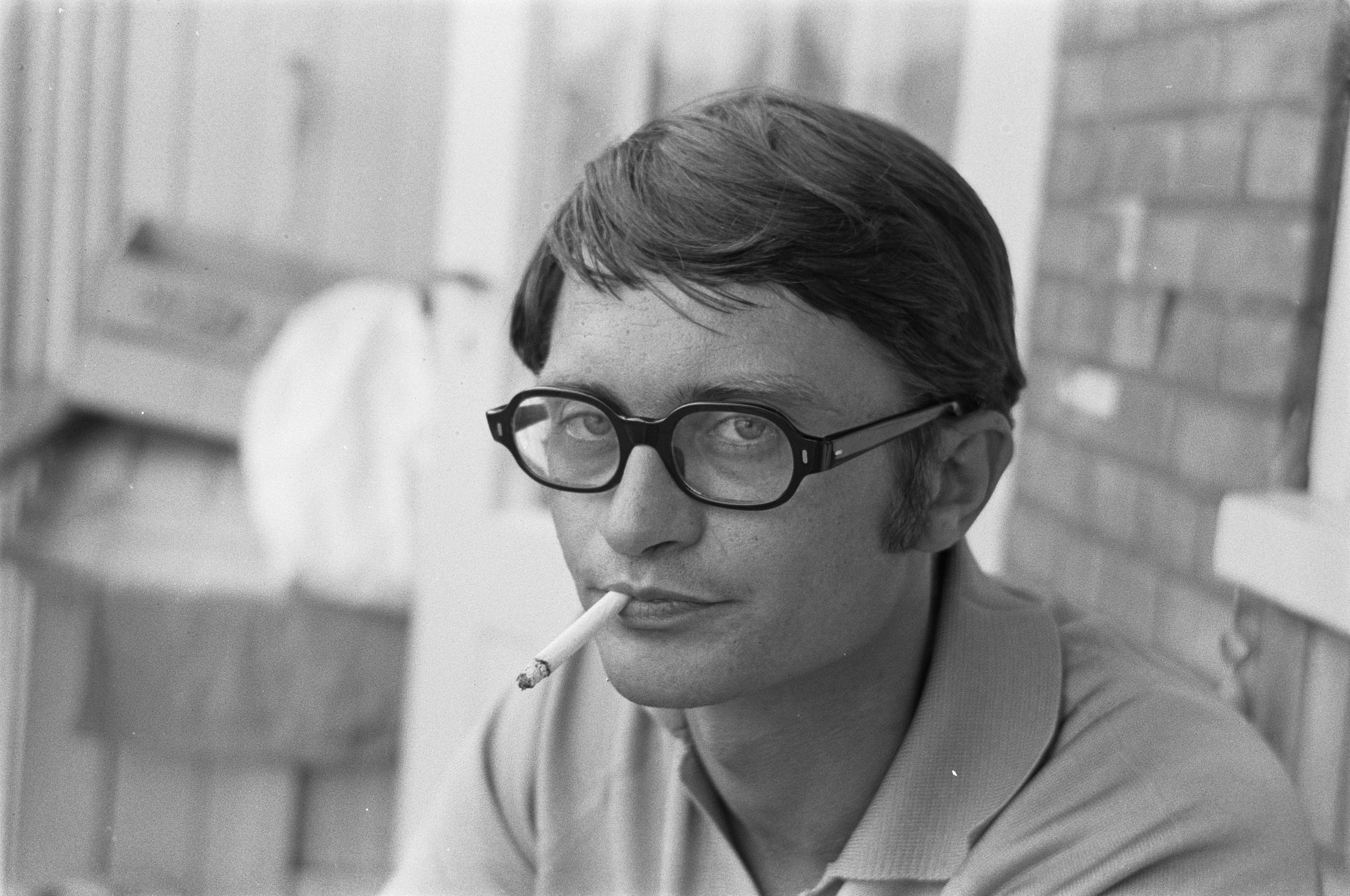
- Campert in 1963
- Born: 28 July 1929; The Hague, Netherlands
- Died: 4 July 2022 (aged 92); Amsterdam, Netherlands
- Education: Lyceum of Amsterdam
- Spouses: Freddy Rutgers (m. 1949–1954); Fritzi Harmsen van Beek (m. 1955–1957); Lucia van de Berg (m. 1961–1966); Deborah Wolf (m. 1996–2022)
- Children: 2
- Writing career
- Pen name: Various
- Language: Dutch
- Period: 1950–2022
- Genres: Poetry; comedy
- Literary movement: "De Vijftigers"

Remco Campert (28 July 1929 – 4 July 2022) was a Dutch author, poet and columnist.

== Early years ==
Remco Wouter Campert was born in The Hague, son of writer and poet Jan Campert, author of the poem De achttien dooden, and actress Joekie Broedelet. His parents separated when he was three years old, causing him to sometimes live with either of his parents and sometimes his grandparents, depending on situations and circumstances. His father died in 1943 in a Nazi concentration camp, Neuengamme. Remco then went to live with his mother. They returned to Amsterdam after World War II in 1945, after having spent the three preceding years in the town of Epe.

== His writings ==
In Amsterdam, he started a secondary education at the Amsterdam Lyceum, occasionally writing articles or drawing comics for the school's newspaper. As the years went on, he skipped more and more classes and spent increasing amounts of time in cinemas, jazz clubs or pubs. He finally left school without graduating. With Rudy Kousbroek, a school friend, he founded the magazine Braak in May 1950. Between 1949 and 1952 Campert drew cartoons for the Dutch magazine Mandrill and Het Parool and in the 1970s for Haagse Post too. In 1979 he drew comics for NRC Handelsblad.

Campert married Freddie Rutgers in 1949, but they separated five years later. In order to finance his living, Campert resorted to writing commercial texts or jingles as well as translating foreign literary works. He later married author Fritzi ten Harmsen van der Beek (daughter of comics artist Harmsen van der Beek), with whom he lived in Blaricum until 1957, when he returned to Amsterdam. He divorced his second wife and married Lucia van den Berg in 1961. They moved to Antwerp in 1964, but Campert returned to Amsterdam two years later. There, he met art gallery owner Deborah Wolf, with whom he lived until 1980.

He has mostly kept quiet about his life in the following years, however, he once explained his situation in 1994, in an interview to Cees van Hoore, journalist of newspaper 'Nieuwsblad van het Noorden'. He was quoted as saying; "I don't choke myself. I'm my own best company. Whenever I lived together with someone, I felt like being underwater for days on end. To be together is to be twice alone and I don't need that. I'm more than happily married to my career."

By the end of the 1970s, he had written very little. He explained to journalist Jan Brokken of the Dutch newspaper Haagse Post: "I couldn't write for years on end. I didn't feel like it. I felt a physical repulsion towards it. I thought about it, but I was paralysed by doubts."

He resumed writing in 1979. He wrote Somberman's actie in 1985. From 1989 until 1995, Campert starred in theatres throughout the nation and beyond in a play he had created together with Jan Mulder (author and ex-football player). Their shows were based on both their literary works. 1995 was also the year he read his bestseller novel 'Het leven is vurrukkulluk' on the radio.

Dutch people of older generations will most likely associate his name with CaMu, the partnership between Remco Campert and Jan Mulder that wrote daily front-page columns for national newspaper 'de Volkskrant' from 1995 until 2006. These columns traditionally have been bundled into books titled CaMu ....: Het jaaroverzicht van Remco Campert en Jan Mulder at the end of each year.

== Bibliography ==
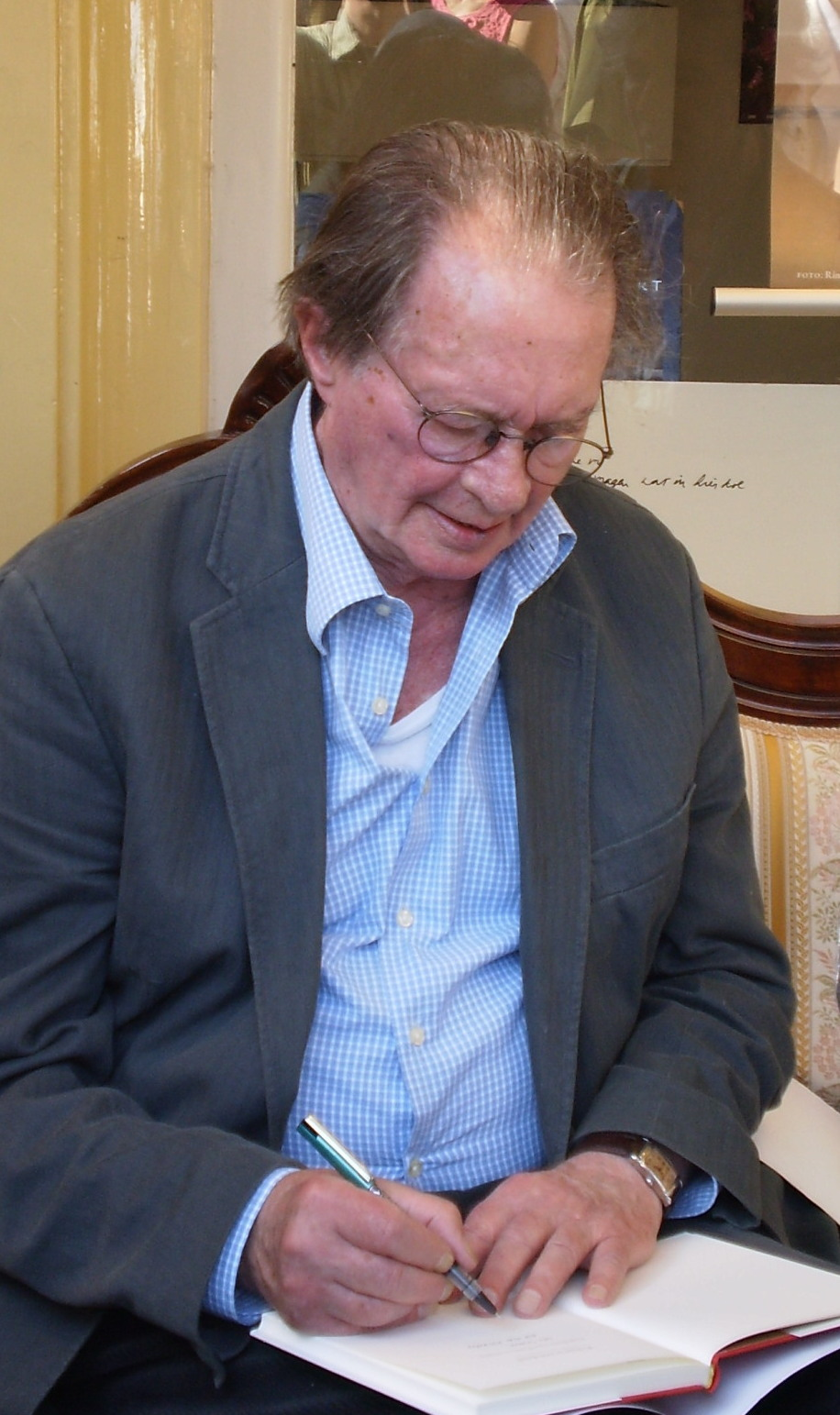
Campert signing a book at a poetry event celebrating his 80th birthday, 2009

- 1950 'Ten lessons with Timothy' (poems).
- 1951 'Vogels vliegen toch' (poems).
- 1952 'Een standbeeld opwinden' (poems).
- 1953 'Berchtesgaden' (poems).
- 1953 'Eendjes voeren' (short stories).
- 1955 'Alle dagen feest' (short stories).
- 1955 'Het huis waarin ik woonde' (poems).
- 1955 'Met man en muis' (poems).
- 1956 'Lodewijk Sebastiaan' (short stories).
- 1956 'Van de wijs' (short stories).
- 1958 'De jongen met het mes en andere verhalen' (short stories).
- 1959 'Bij hoog en bij laag' (poems).
- 1960 'Een ellendige nietsnut en andere verhalen' (short stories).
- 1961 'Het leven is vurrukkulluk' (novel).
- 1962 'Dit gebeurde overal' (poems, also appeared in English under the title 'This happened everywhere').
- 1962 'Het paard van Ome Loeks' (short stories).
- 1963 'Liefdes schijnbewegingen : een leesboek' (novel, also appeared in English under the title 'No holds barred')
- 1964 'Nacht op de kale dwerg' (short stories).
- 1965 'Het gangstermeisje' (novel, also appeared in English under the title 'The gangster girl').
- 1965 'Hoera, hoera' (poems).
- 1968 'Fabeltjes vertellen' (short stories).
- 1968 'Mijn leven's liederen' (poems).
- 1968 'Tjeempie! of Liesje in Luiletterland' (novel).
- 1969 'Hoe ik mijn verjaardag vierde' (short stories).
- 1970 'Betere tijden' (poems).
- 1971 'Campert Compleet' (short stories).
- 1972 'James Dean en het verdriet' (short stories).
- 1974 'Basta het toverkonijn' (short stories).
- 1974 'Op reis' (novel, written together with Willem Malsen).
- 1976 'Alle bundels gedichten' (poems).
- 1976 'Luister goed naar wat ik verzwijg' (thoughts and philosophies).
- 1978 'Waar is Remco Campert?' (short stories).
- 1979 'Theater' (poems).
- 1980 'Na de troonrede' (short stories).
- 1980 'De tijden' (novel).
- 1982 'Een beetje natuur' (short stories).
- 1983 'De Harm & Miepje Kurk Story' (novel).
- 1983 'Scènes in Hotel Morandi' (poems).
- 1984 'Amsterdamse dagen' (poems).
- 1984 'Drie vergeten gedichten' (poems).
- 1984 'Kinderverhalen van Remco Campert' (short children's stories).
- 1984 'Wie doet de koningin?' (short stories).
- 1984 'Zeven vrijheden' (poems).
- 1985 'Somberman's actie' (novel, "Boekenweekgeschenk").
- 1985 'Somberman's maandag' (novel).
- 1985 'Zijn hoofd verliezen' (novel).
- 1986 'Collega's (poems).
- 1986 'Rustig' (novel).
- 1986 'Tot zoens' (short stories).
- 1987 'Eetlezen' (columns).
- 1988 'Een neger uit Mozambique : een keuze uit de gedichten' (poems).
- 1988 'Toen ik je zag' (Poems accompanying photographs of Peter Dejong).
- 1989 'Zachtjes neerkomen' (novel).
- 1990 'Gouden dagen' (novel).
- 1990 'Graag gedaan' (columns and short stories).
- 1991 'Campert compleet vervolg : verhalen 1971–1991' (short stories).
- 1991 'Dansschoenen' (novel).
- 1992 'Rechterschoenen' (poems).
- 1993 'Het bijzettafeltje' (columns).
- 1994 'Fiebelekwinten' (short stories, written together with Jan Mulder).
- 1994 'Restbeelden : notities van Izegrim' (poems).
- 1994 'Straatfotografie' (poems).
- 1994 'Vele kleintjes' (columns).
- 1995 'Dichter' (poems).
- 1995 'Ohi, hoho, bang, bang, of Het lied van de vrijheid' (novel).
- 1996 'De zomer van de zwarte jurkjes' (columns).
- 1998 'Een mooie jonge vriendin en andere belevenissen (short stories)
- 2004 'Een liefde in Parijs' (novel).
- 2006 'Het satijnen hart' (novel).
- 2007 'I Dreamed in the Cities at Night' (selected poems translated to English by Donald Gardner)
- 2007 'Dagboek van een poes' (short story)
- 2010 'Om vijf uur in de middag' (short stories).
- 2013 'Hôtel du Nord' (novel)

== Literary awards ==
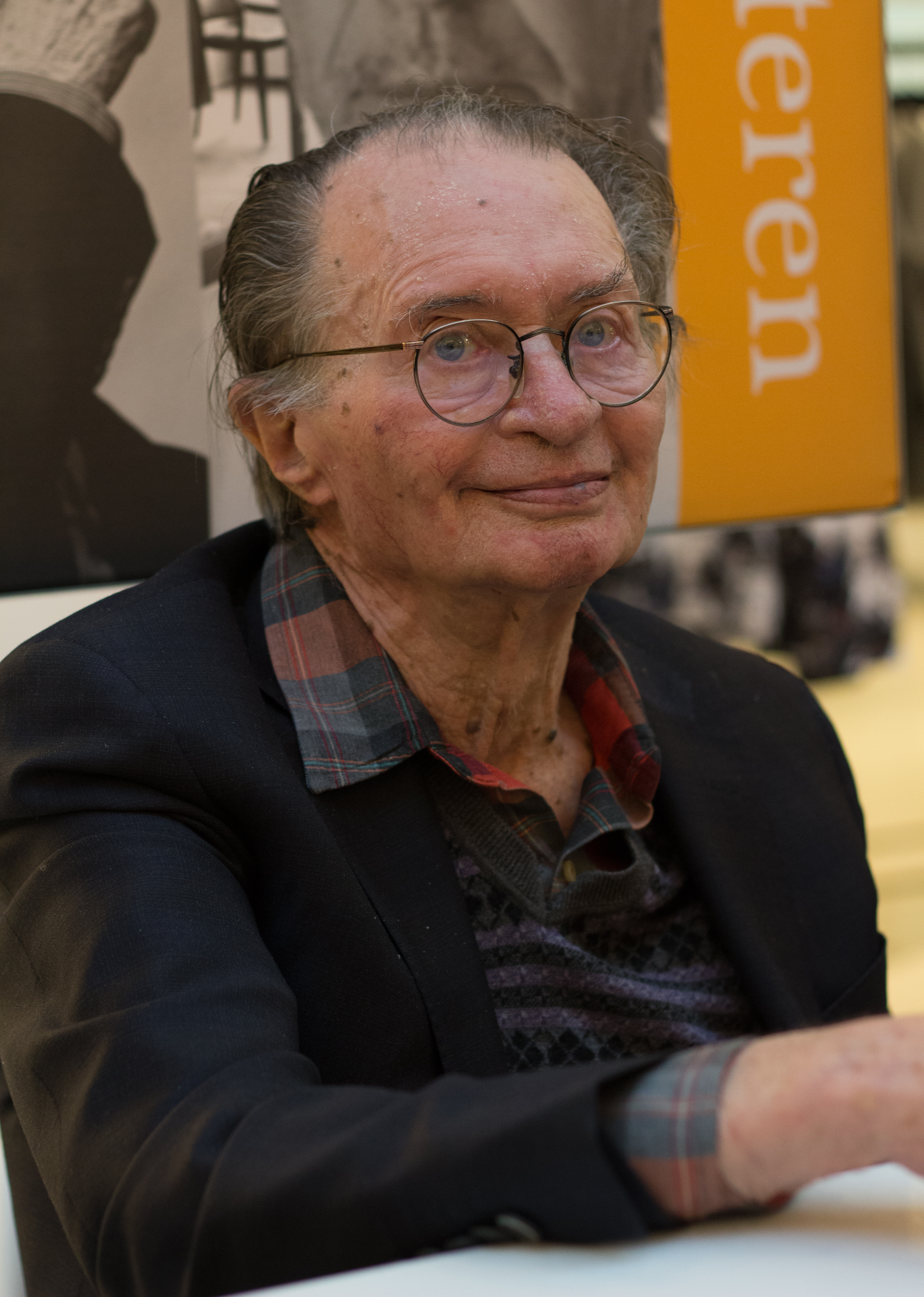
Campert in 2015

- 1953 – Reina Prinsen Geerligs Award for 'Berchtesgaden'
- 1955 – Poetry award of the city of Amsterdam for 'Gedicht met een moraal'
- 1956 – Jan Campert award for 'Met man en muis en Het huis waarin ik woonde'
- 1958 – Anne Frank award for 'Vogels vliegen toch'
- 1959 – Proza award of the city of Amsterdam for 'De jongen met het mes'
- 1960 – Award of the Amsterdamse Art-council for 'De jongen met het mes'
- 1976 – P.C. Hooft-award for his poetic works
- 1987 – Cestoda-award
- 2011 – Gouden Ganzenveer
- 2015 – Prijs der Nederlandse Letteren
