= Fritzi Harmsen van Beek =

Dutch poet, writer and illustrator (1927–2009)

- Born: Frederike Martine ten Harmsen van der Beek; June 28, 1927; Blaricum, Netherlands
- Died: April 4, 2009 (aged 81); Groningen, Netherlands
- Occupations: Poet; prose writer; illustrator
- Spouses: Eric de Mareschal (m. 1951–1952); Remco Campert (m. 1957–1960)
- Children: 1
- Parents: Harmsen van der Beek (father); Freddie Langeler (mother)
- Writing career
- Pen name: Fritzi Harmsen van der Beek, among others
- Language: Dutch
- Notable works: Geachte Muizenpoot en Achttien Andere Gedichten and Neerbraak

Frederike Martine ten Harmsen van der Beek (June 28, 1927 – April 4, 2009), known as Fritzi Harmsen van Beek, was a Dutch writer.

The daughter of the cartoonist Harmsen van der Beek, she became an illustrator and poet, receiving significant attention for her debut collection Geachte Muizenpoot en Achttien Andere Gedichten. Her work, which also included short stories, was noted for its grotesque and subversive elements.

Harmsen van der Beek resented the media's portrayal of her as a wild bohemian, and she retreated for the latter decades of her life to a small village in the far northeast of the Netherlands.

== Early life ==
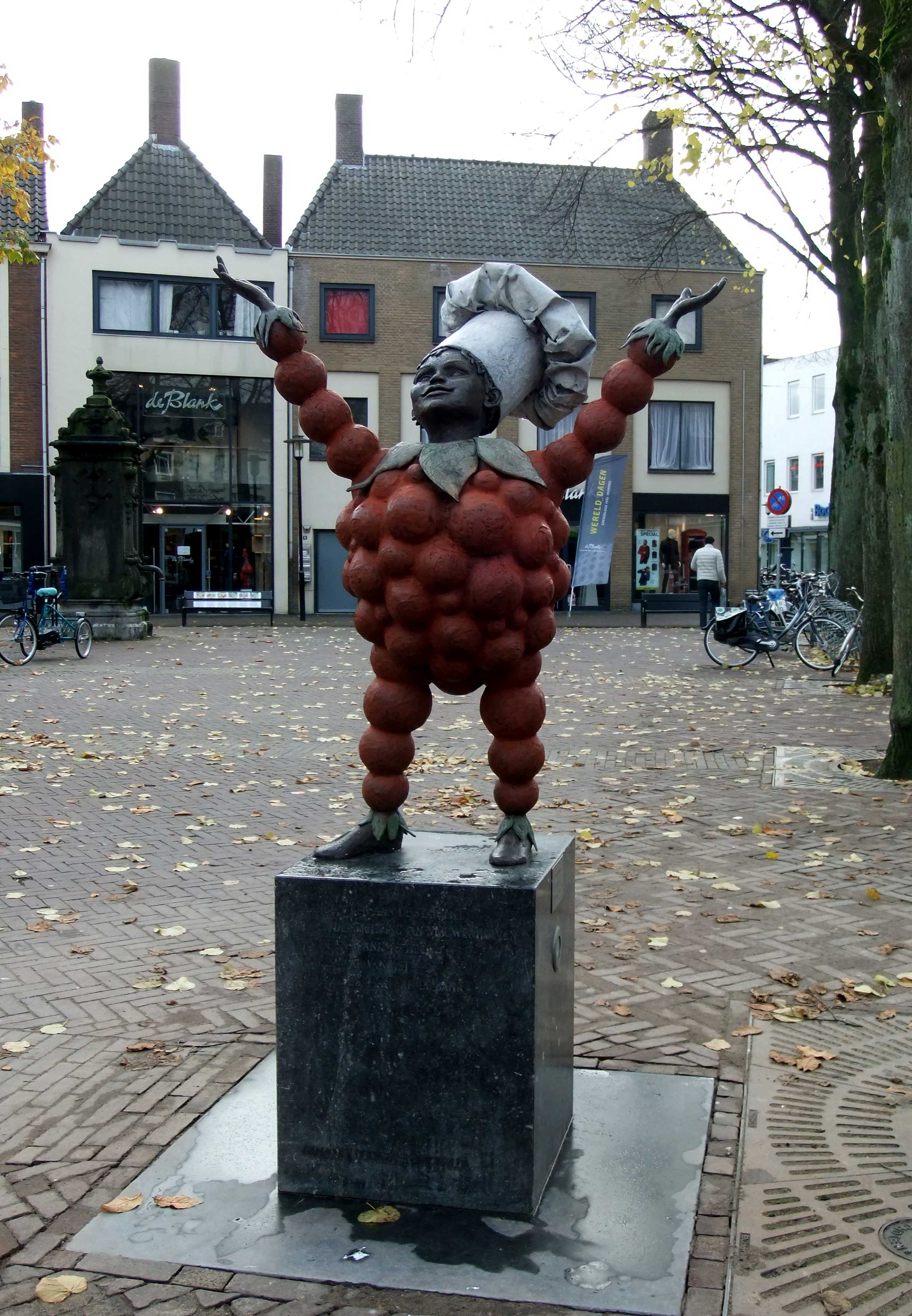
A statue of Flipje, the subject of her father's best-known work, in Tiel, Netherlands.

Frederike ten Harmsen van der Beek, known as a child by the nickname Fritzi, was born in 1927 in Blaricum, Netherlands, outside of Amsterdam.

Her father, Eelco Martinus ten Harmsen van der Beek, was the creator of the popular Dutch comic strip Flipje, and her mother, Freddie Langeler, was also an illustrator, working on comics and children's books.

She began helping her father with his work on the comic strip when she was only 4 years old.

After graduating secondary school, Harmsen van der Beek attended arts school in Amsterdam on and off, but she never graduated due to a lack of financial support from her family.

== Career ==
=== Illustration ===
After her father died in 1953, Harmsen van der Beek finished the run of Flipje comics he had been working on. She then produced a new Flipje comic, but her work was considered not gentle enough for the publisher, and this comic was subsequently deemed "lost" and not republished until September 2015. Later in the decade she produced her own comic strip, Rampoo & Zizi, based on her relationship with her husband at the time. She also contributed illustrations to the magazine Vrij Nederland

When she began to publish books of poetry and prose, she illustrated some of her work herself, including, notably, 1972's Hoenderlust. She also published an illustrated children's book, Gewone Piet & Andere Piet, in 1969.

=== Writing ===
Harmsen van der Beek has been described as a "poet's poet." She did not self-identify as a writer, and had a "subversive relationship with the literary world, to which she refused to belong."

After printing several of her poems in magazines to positive critical response, in 1965 she published her debut poetry collection, Geachte Muizenpoot en Achttien Andere Gedichten, which became a bestseller and drew critical acclaim. Her 1969 story collection Neerbraak established her reputation as a prose writer.

Her work is known for its elements of imaginative, grotesque imagery. Critics count her poems among the most original postwar poetry in the Netherlands.

== Personal life ==
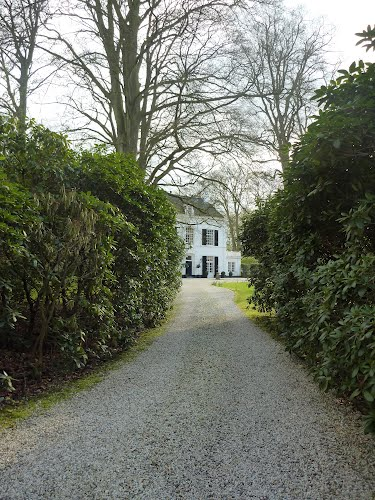
The Jagtlust villa in Blaricum where Harmsen van Beek lived for many years.

While working as a housekeeper and studying in France in her mid-20s, Harmsen van der Beek met Eric de Mareschal, a geology student. After she became pregnant, the two married under pressure from her father, and she gave birth to a son, Gilles (1951–2006). The marriage lasted only a year, ending in 1952, with the divorce becoming official in 1955.

From 1957 to 1960 she was married to Remco Campert, a fellow writer. She had subsequent engagements to various other men, including the artist Peter Vos, but never remarried.

In the late 1950s, after she and her brother Hein had spent their inheritance, they squatted in the Jagtlust villa in Blaricum, which became a hub of the Amsterdam art scene. She lived there alongside a parade of visiting artists and writers until 1971, when the building, which had become overrun by her many cats, was cleared out by the Amsterdam City Council.

Harmsen van der Beek had an adversarial relationship with the press, which she saw as egregiously encroaching on her privacy and unfairly depicting her as a bohemian wild child. After she was evicted from the Blaricum villa, she moved to the remote village of Garnwerd to avoid attention from press and fans. Her move was financed by family friends and fellow members of the Amsterdam art scene.

== Death and legacy ==
Harmsen van der Beek died in 2009 in a nursing home in Groningen.

The Jagtlust villa where she had lived in the 1950s and '60s, which served as an artists colony, is listed as a rijksmonument.

In 2018, she was the subject of a biography by the Dutch literary scholar Maaike Meijer.

== Selected works ==
=== Poetry ===
- Geachte Muizenpoot en achttien andere gedichten (poetry, 1965)
- Kus of ik schrijf (1975)

=== Prose ===
- Wat knaagt? Verhalen (1968)
- Gewone Piet & Andere Piet (1969)
- Neerbraak. Verhalen (1969)
- Hoenderlust (1972)

=== Posthumous ===
- In goed en kwaad. Verzameld werk (collected works, 2012)
