= M. Vasalis =

Dutch poet and psychiatrist (1909–1988)

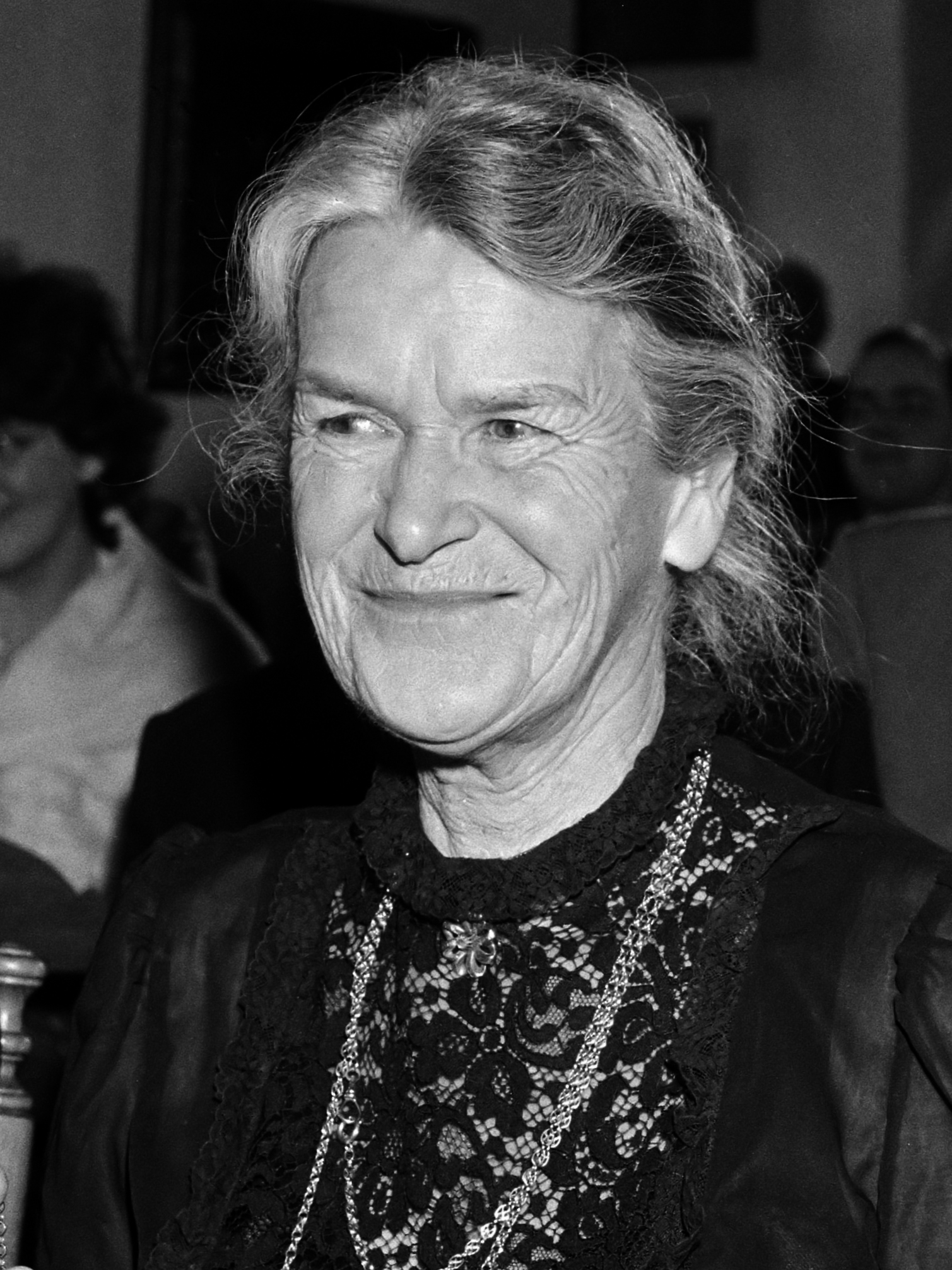
M. Vasalis in 1983

M. Vasalis (pseudonym for Margaretha "Kiekie" Droogleever Fortuyn-Leenmans; 13 February 1909 – 16 October 1998) was a Dutch poet and psychiatrist.

== Pseudonym ==
"Vasalis" is a Latinization of her last name, "Leenmans." The "M" does not stand for "Maria," as is sometimes incorrectly reported. Initially, she wanted to publish her work without revealing it was written by a woman. When, through Simon Vestdijk (a Dutch novelist), she had the chance to debut in the literary magazine "Groot Nederland," they did not allow her to sign her work with merely her initials. She decided to write and publish under a pseudonym. Since her father had written and published under the name "Vazal" while he was a student, she decided to play with this Latin translation of her last name, resulting in "Vasalis."

== Life and work ==
Margaretha (known as Kiekie or Kiek to friends), grew up on the outskirts of Scheveningen, and studied medicine and anthropology at Leiden University. She was a member of the sorority Zestigpoot, which means "sixty legs." The name was based on the fifteen members and their four limbs (15x4). Crown Princess Juliana was also a member. They rewrote the fairy tale about Bluebeard into a new theater play that was performed by the members of the sorority. Leenmans played the part of Bluebeard, while Juliana played the wife.

After her education, in 1939, she settled in Amsterdam to work as a medical doctor. Later, she worked as a psychiatrist for children in Assen and Groningen, the Netherlands. During the 1930s, she befriended J.C. Bloem, Adriaan Roland Holst, Albert van Dalsum, Victor van Vriesland, Titus Leeser, and many others at the 'salon artistique' hosted by the lawyer Harro Bouman and his wife, Carina Bouman-Hofstede Crull. She married Jan Droogleever Fortuyn in 1939, who would become a professor of neurology.

In 1940, Vasalis made her debut with the poetry collection Parken en Woestijnen, or "Parks and Deserts." Other works of poetry include De Vogel Phoenix (1947) ("The Bird Phoenix") and Vergezichten en Gezichten (1954) (roughly translated as "Sights and Faces"). The three poetry collections published during her lifetime contained only about one hundred poems. De Oude Kustlijn ("The Old Coastline") appeared posthumously in 2002. Her children, Lous, Hal, and Maria Droogleever Fortuyn, took care of this publication as she had asked them to.

Vasalis wrote traditional poems characterized by the use of personification and anthropomorphism. Her poems often consist of several impressions of nature, ending in self-reflection. Besides poems, Vasalis also wrote various essays and a novella. Her work has received numerous awards, including the prestigious Constantijn Huygens Prize in 1974 and the Lucy B. and C.W. van der Hoogt Prize in 1982.

Ton Anbeek, a Dutch writer and literary scientist, described her poems as "seemingly banal facts that may lead to a flash of insight."

"Afsluitdijk" from Parken en Woestijnen (1940) is considered one of her best-known poems.

When her husband became a professor at the University of Groningen, they moved there with the family in 1951. Vasalis lived in 'House de Zulthe' near the village of Roden from 1964 until her death in 1998.

== Legacy ==
There is a bed and breakfast in 'House de Zulthe' in Roden, the Netherlands, the house where Vasalis lived during the latter part of her life. There are also plans to create a special Vasalis garden at her last residence. In 2009, a memorial was placed in honor of her 100th anniversary.

In Leiden, at the corner of Lijsterstraat and Leeuwerikstraat, a bronze portrait of Vasalis can be found. The sculpture was created by Aart Schonk. Vasalis lived in this area during her medical education, from 1927 to 1934. The portrait was placed on the initiative of the Society of Dutch Literature, following the publication of the Vasalis biography by Maaike Meijer. Meijer wrote the biography with the assistance of Vasalis's descendants, though it was done with caution, as Vasalis had always safeguarded her identity and privacy during her lifetime.

A train from the Dutch company Arriva is named after M. Vasalis.

== Works ==
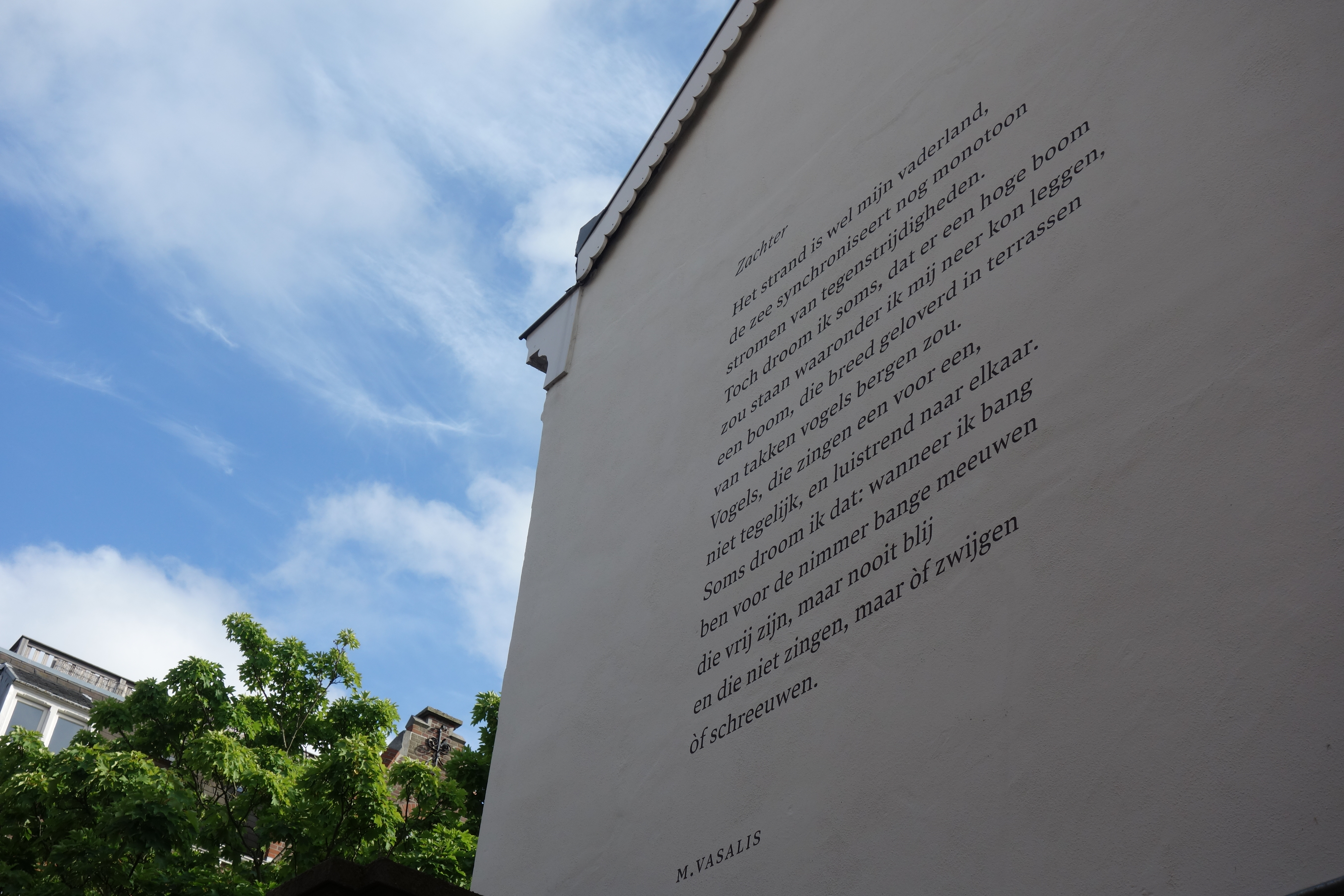
Poem by Vasalis on a wall in The Hague

- 1940 - Onweer, in Drie Novellen, met J. Campert en E. Eewijck
- 1940 - Parken en woestijnen
- 1945 - Fragmenten uit een journaal, in Criterium
- 1947 - De vogel Phoenix
- 1952 - Naar aanleiding van Atonaal, in Libertinage
- 1954 - Vergezichten en gezichten, een bloemlezing van verzen
- 1958 - Kunstenaar en verzet
- 1960 - De dichter en de zee, bloemlezing
- 1964 - (S)teken aan de wand, in Raam, toespraak
- 1977 - Dankwoord bij de uitreiking van de C. Huygensprijs 1974, in Literama
- 1982 - Het ezeltje, facsimile
- 1983 - Pijn, waarvoor geen naam bestaat, juryrapport over enkele gedichten van de Nederlandse auteur Bunnik
- 1984 - Dankwoord bij de aanvaarding van de P.C. Hooftprijs 1982
- 2002 - De oude kustlijn, posthumously published by her children.
- 2009 - De amanuensis
- 2009 - Briefwisseling 1951-1987 / M. Vasalis, Geert van Oorschot. Uitgeverij G.A. van Oorschot, Amsterdam, 2009
- 2011 - Vriendenbrieven. Exchange in letters between Kiek Drooglever Fortuyn-Leenmans en Harro & Carina Bouman-Hofstede Crull. Woubrugge, 2011 [bezorgd door Hessel Bouman].

== Literary prizes ==
- 1941 - Lucy B. en C.W. van der Hoogt prize for Parken en woestijnen
- 1955 - Poetry prize of the municipality of Amsterdam for Vergezichten en gezichten
- 1963 - Cultural prize of the province of Groningen
- 1974 - Constantijn Huygensprize for Vasalis' oeuvre
- 1982 - P.C. Hooft-prize for Vasalis' oeuvre

== Documentary ==
- Sporen van Vasalis, directed by Willem van der Linde. Stichting Beeldlijn, Groningen, 2010 (dvd, 50 min.). Portrait of the poet based on an interview in 1987 by Ronald Ohlsen.

== Biography ==
- Meijer, Maaike. M. Vasalis: een biografie. Van Oorschot, Amsterdam, 2011, 966 p. ISBN 978-90-282-4120-6 / ISBN 978-90-282-4149-7.

== See also ==
- For more information: this page in Dutch
