= Peter Wienk =

Dutch illustrator and painter

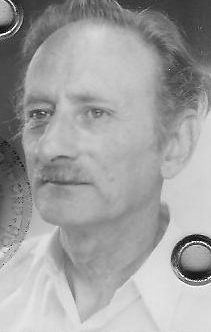
- Peter Wienk in 1973
- Born: 11 September 1920; Amsterdam, the Netherlands
- Died: 16 August 2010 (aged 89); IJsselstein, the Netherlands
- Known for: Illustrating; painting

Peter Wienk (11 September 1920 – 16 August 2010) was a Dutch illustrator and painter.

== Biography ==
=== 1920-1950 ===
From early childhood, Peter Wienk had been drawing and was allowed to take lessons from Miss A.C. Gijswijt, a close friend of the Amsterdamse Joffers (group of Dutch female artists). At the age of 14 he had to leave school to earn a living and started working as a car mechanic and chauffeur for Van Kleef (Van Cleef?). After his escape from captivity in East Germany in 1945, he started working as an illustrator for various advertising agencies and drawing studios including the Toonder Studios of Marten Toonder a famous Dutch illustrator. In 1947, he joined Reclamebureau Van Alfen (Advertising), where amongst others the Flipje character (funny fruit character of a well-known Dutch preserve manufacturer) was made by Eelco ten Harmsen van der Beek ('Harmsen van der Beek').

=== 1950-1970: Noddy ===
Beek had his own art studio and accepted an assignment in 1949 to illustrate a new story of children's author Enid Blyton: Noddy. This first appeared as a strip in an English newspaper, but proved so successful that soon after the first book was published: Noddy Goes to Toyland. Due to the nimble writing pace of Enid Blyton, Beek employed an assistant, Wienk, in 1950. Initially for colouring the drawings made by Beek, later Wienk drew the Noddy characters himself as well. Beek died in 1953, after which Wienk, Marten Toonder and a few other illustrators had rivaled to obtain the continuing contract for the Noddy books. Although Toonder was a famous and established Dutch illustrator, Enid Blyton found Wienk's drawings better suited to her wishes for the Noddy character. Between 1953 and 1970 Wienk has illustrated a large number of Noddy books, as well as Noddy Big Books. Enid Blyton dies in 1968 and in 1970 the work on the Noddy books ends for Wienk.

=== 1952-1971: Other work ===
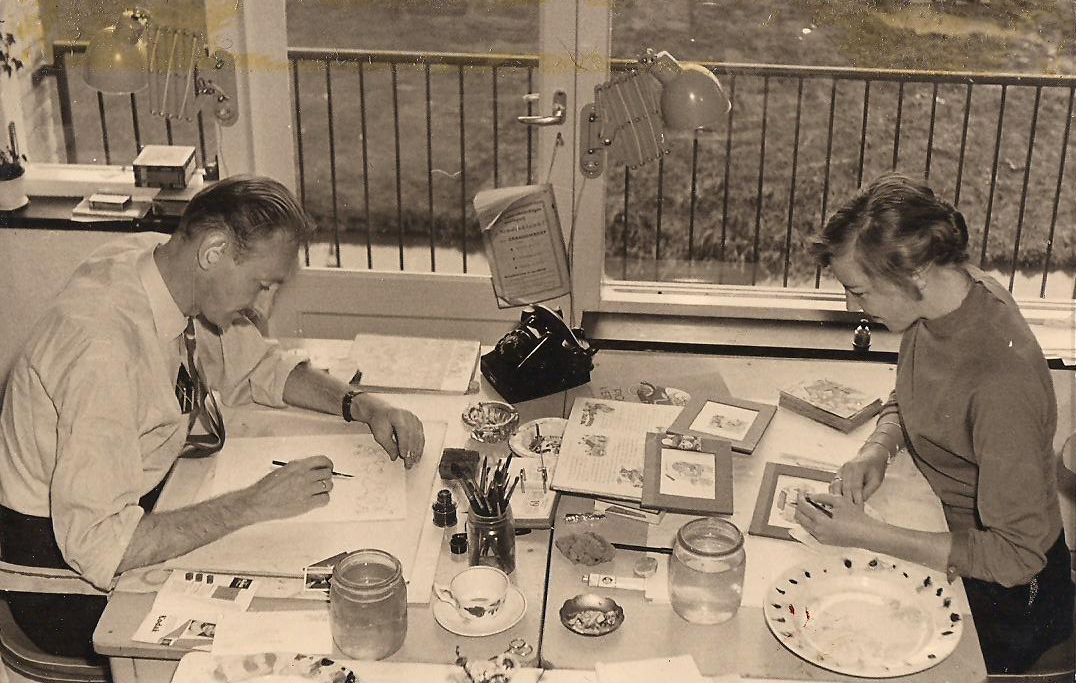
Peter Wienk and Nelly Koenen at work

In 1952 Wienk established his own art studio, Studio Wienk. Apart from Noddy, he obtained assignments for illustrations, including Sic Natura, English textbooks, Blooker's Cocoa and Wonderen van de Natuur (Miracles of Nature) which appeared weekly in newspapers in the Netherlands, England, Germany, France, the United States and Australia. Wienk had designed various comic strips himself, including Nikkie, which appeared in Dutch and English newspapers. He had employed a number of artists and in 1955 Nelly Koenen also applied, who had attended the Art Academy in Maastricht. Wienk married her in 1957.

=== 1971-2010: Paintings ===
In 1971 Wienk trained as insurance adviser and in 1973 opened his office Wienk Assurantiën-Financieringen (Insurance-Financing). In his free time he was forever drawing and painting and had created many works. After his retirement Wienk moved to the Nijmegen region, where he began to devote himself entirely to painting with various techniques. He made both commissioned work and free work. Along with Nel Koenen, Wienk has held various exhibitions. Nel died in 2015 in Maastricht, at the age of 85.

Peter Wienk had two children, Reinoud and Chris. He died in IJsselstein on 16 August 2010, at age 89.

== Work ==
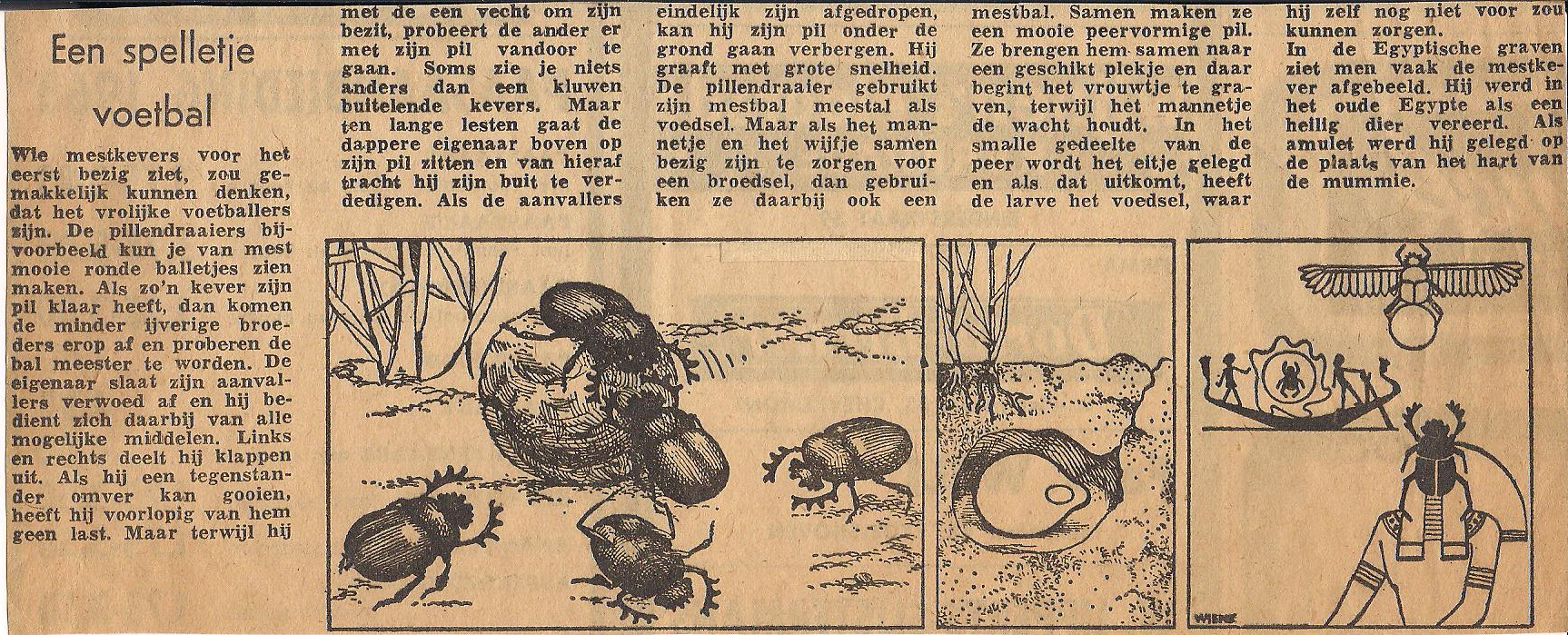
Wonders of Nature, story and illustrations by Peter Wienk

=== Illustrations ===
- 1952-1969 – Sic Natura (Peter Wienk) (published in Dutch and various foreign newspapers)
- 1952-1963 – Various comic strips (Peter Wienk) (published in Dutch and English newspapers)
- 1953-1970 – Noddy books and Noddy Big Books (Enid Blyton)
- 1953-1971 – Wonderen van de Natuur (Wonders of Nature) (Peter Wienk) (published in Dutch and various foreign newspapers)
- ±1959-1961 – Nikkie (Peter Wienk) (published in Dutch and various foreign newspapers)
- ±1960 – Margriet Vacantieboek (Dutch magazine yearly supplement)
- 1962 – Birds in the Garden (George E. Hyde)
- 1963 – How to Know Trees (George E. Hyde)
- 1963 – Furry Creatures of the Countryside (George E. Hyde)
- 1985 – Flierefluiter wienkt... (Jan van Goch)
- 1986 – Birthday calendar (commission by NMB bank)

=== Exhibitions ===
- 1983 – Sales exhibition (Amsterdam) (Peter and Nel Wienk)
- 1984 – De Weijer Exhibition Centre (Boxmeer) (Peter and Nel Wienk)
- 1985 – Nature Exhibition (Rijkevoort) (Peter Wienk)
- 1986 – Art Oploo ca ’86 (St. Anthonis) (Peter and Nel Wienk)
