= Maaike Meijer =

Dutch literary scholar

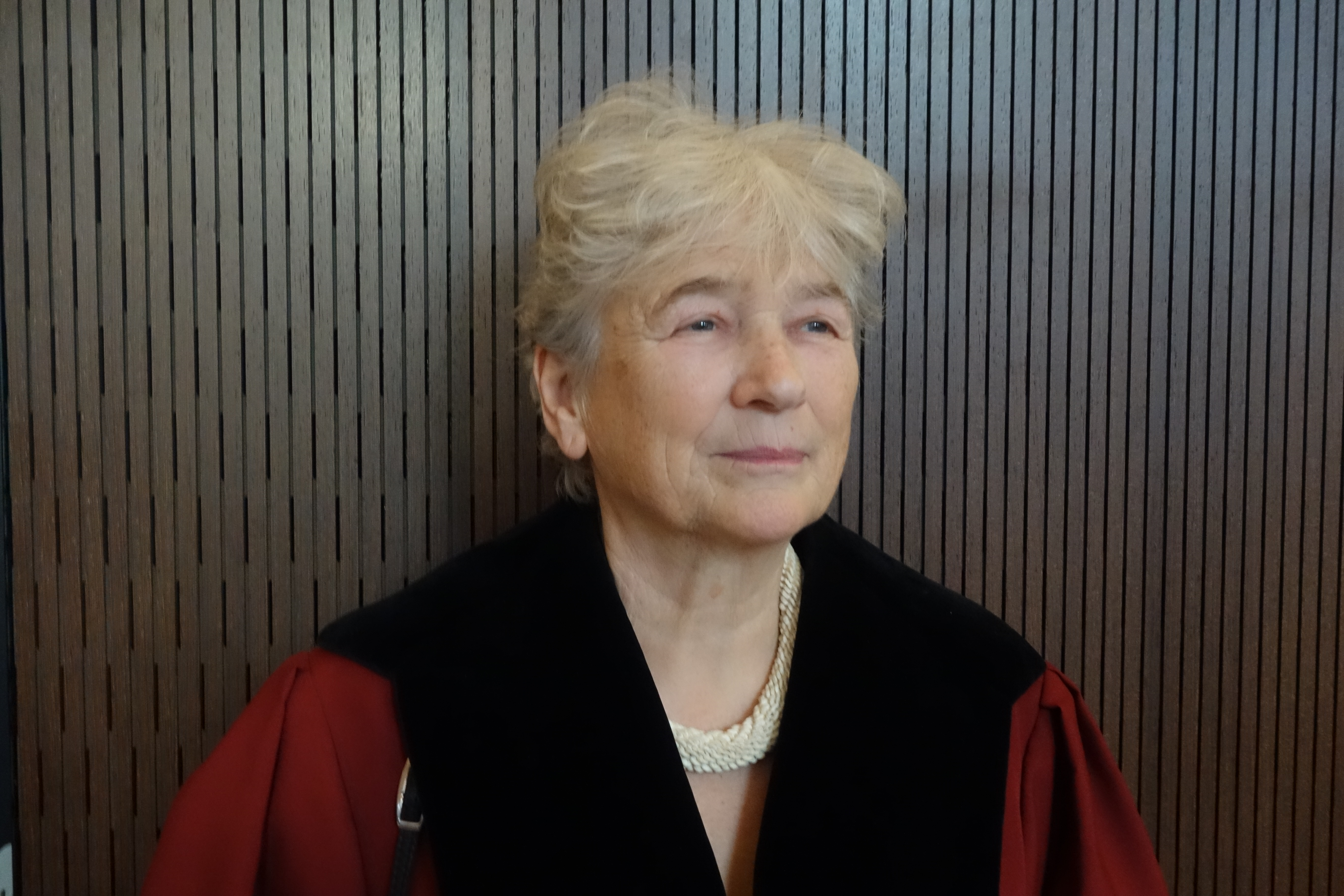
- Born: 25 January 1949 (age 77); Eindhoven
- Occupation: Professor of gender studies
- Employer: Utrecht University
- Known for: studies of Dutch poetry and gender studies
- Website: maaikemeijer.nl

Maaike Meijer (born 25 January 1949) is a Dutch literary scholar. She is a Professor emeritus of Maastricht University.

== Life ==
Meijer was born in Eindhoven in 1949, and gained her doctorate cum laude from Utrecht University in 1988 with a thesis entitled De lust tot lezen(Lust/zest for reading). She argued that women poets had been overlooked and that a less technical review of their work was required. She then worked for ten years at the same university, where she led the post graduate women's studies doctoral students. From 1997 to 1999, as an endowed professor, she was the first professor of the Opzij chair at Maastricht University. She taught Gender, Representation and Power.

In 1972 Meijer was one of the founders of the lesbian feminist action group Purple September, a spin-off from Dolle Mina. In 1979 the Lesbian beautiful book was edited by Meijer. She was a columnist for the lesbian magazine Diva and was in the first editorial of the lesbian magazine Lust en Gratie .

In 1998 she published "The Defiant Muse" and she became a full professor of gender studies at the Center for Gender and Diversity at Maastricht University. Her book "The Defiant Muse" dealt with the history of "Dutch and Flemish Feminist Poems from the Middle Ages to the Present" and it included extracts of poetry as well as biographies of the poets. The book was bi-lingual including both Dutch and English translations. She is an advocate for women poets who are better than but not as well known as some male poets.

Meijer was a contributor of biographies to the Routledge International Encyclopedia of Queer Culture published in 2006.

She worked on poetry theory and culture studies. In 2011 she published a biography of M. Vasalis. Maijer created the Vasalis biography with the help of her descendants, but it was said to be done with caution as Vasalis had always protected her identity and her privacy during her lifetime, but Maijer noted that she had kept documents carefully and destroyed some indicating that she had been aware that they would in time be read.

She retired in 2014, but she continued to research, write and talk. In 2018 she published a biography of the Dutch poet and illustrator Fritzi Harmsen van Beek. The book followed interviews with people who knew her and it was nominated for a literature prize.
