= Harmsen van der Beek =

Dutch illustrator and commercial artist

- Born: Eelco Martinus ten Harmsen van der Beek; 8 October 1897
- Died: 24 July 1953 (aged 55)
- Education: Rijksakademie van beeldende kunsten
- Known for: illustrating Noddy book series by Enid Blyton
- Spouse: Freddie Langeler (died 1948)
- Children: 2, including Fritzi

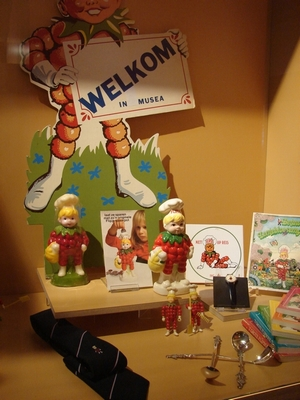
Flipje Museum in Tiel.

Eelco Martinus ten Harmsen van der Beek (more commonly Harmsen van der Beek or just Beek; 8 October 1897 – 24 July 1953) was a Dutch illustrator and commercial artist. Abroad, he is best remembered for his illustration of Enid Blyton's Noddy books.

Van der Beek was the creator of the Flipje character in 1935. This was a comic strip featuring a character made of berries which was commissioned by a jam factory in Tiel. He was already well known in the Netherlands when he approached London publishers Sampson Low at the end of the 1940s. The result was the creation of the Noddy series for young children, authored by Enid Blyton - still a major property for animators half a century later. Van der Beek simply signed his work as "Beek". The conscious intention to create a Disney-style sympathetic focus character — a European Mickey Mouse — was reportedly a major factor. Beek's death in 1953 led to a few new illustrators for the Noddy books, amongst which was his assistant Peter Wienk.

== Biography ==
Beek's father was a pharmacist in Amsterdam. As a child, he and his brother Hein sold postcards which Beek had drawn, on the streets of Amsterdam. Eelco attended the Rijksschool voor Kunstnijverheid and the Rijksacademie voor Beeldende Kunsten in Amsterdam from 1916 to 1918 and subsequently began a career as a commercial artist, as well as an illustrator for newspapers and magazines. One of the first books he illustrated was De Driewenschen (1920), by Jac van der Klei, a writer of children's books and school textbooks.

In 1935, Beek started to draw the comic strip Flipje for the jam factory "De Betuwe". It was a metre long and was displayed on shelves in front of the jam jars in stores. Beek's wife, Freddie Langeler (1899–1948), herself an artist, wrote the rhyming text for the strip and coloured in the drawings. In 1936, a printer named De IJssel produced a cardboard theatre which could be used to display the comic strip as a slide show. It was illuminated from behind with a flashlight. It was dubbed the "Flipposcoop" (Flipposcope) and Flipje appeared in a special strip with instructions on how to assemble and load the theatre.

In 1953, Beek asked De Betuwe for permission to release the Flipje character in the United Kingdom. They refused and Beek severed relations with the company. He died six days later.

Beek and Langeler had a son and a daughter, Fritzi Harmsen van Beek (1927–2009), who was a writer, poet and herself an illustrator.
