= Jan Campert =

Dutch journalist, theater critic and writer

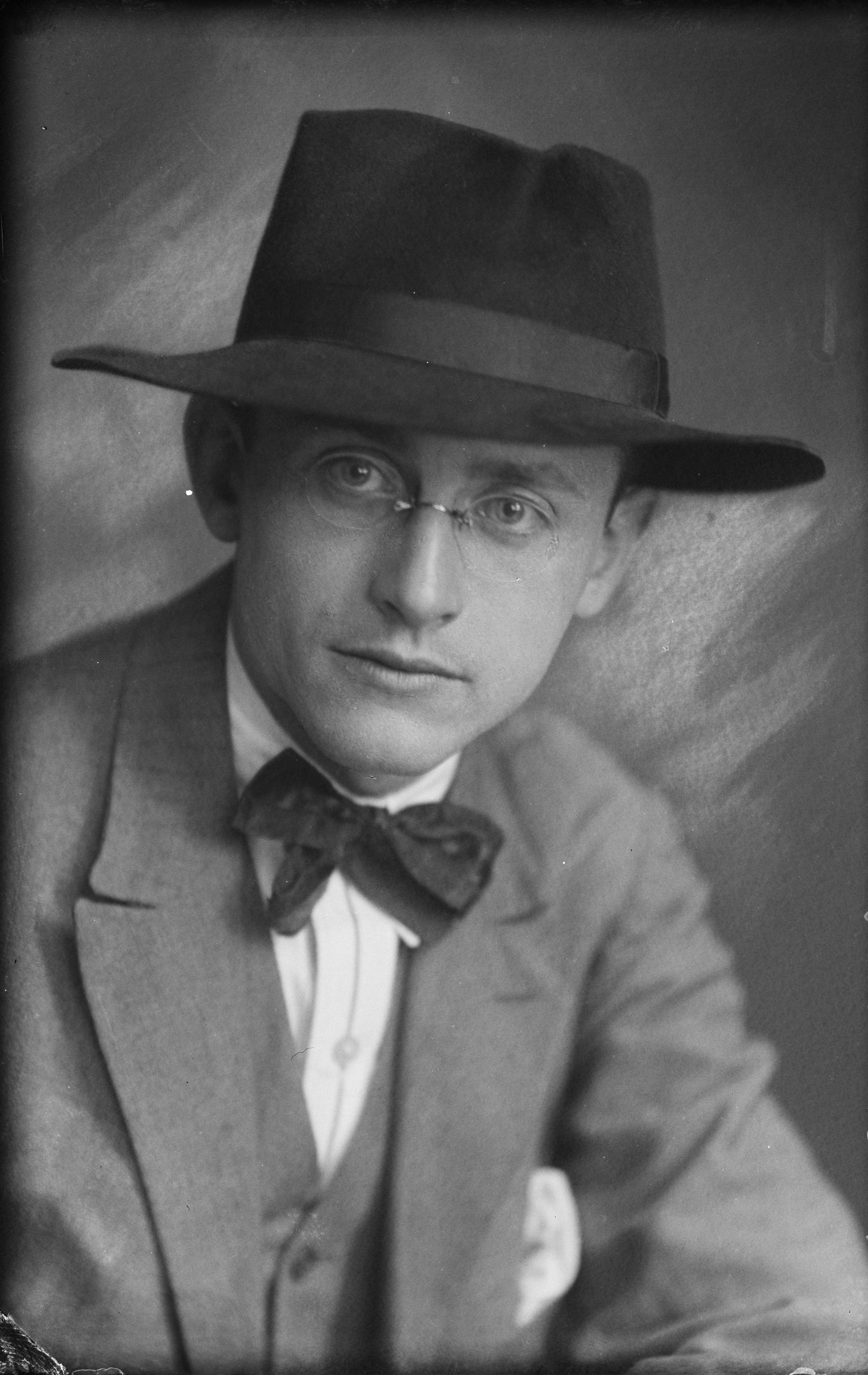
Jan Campert

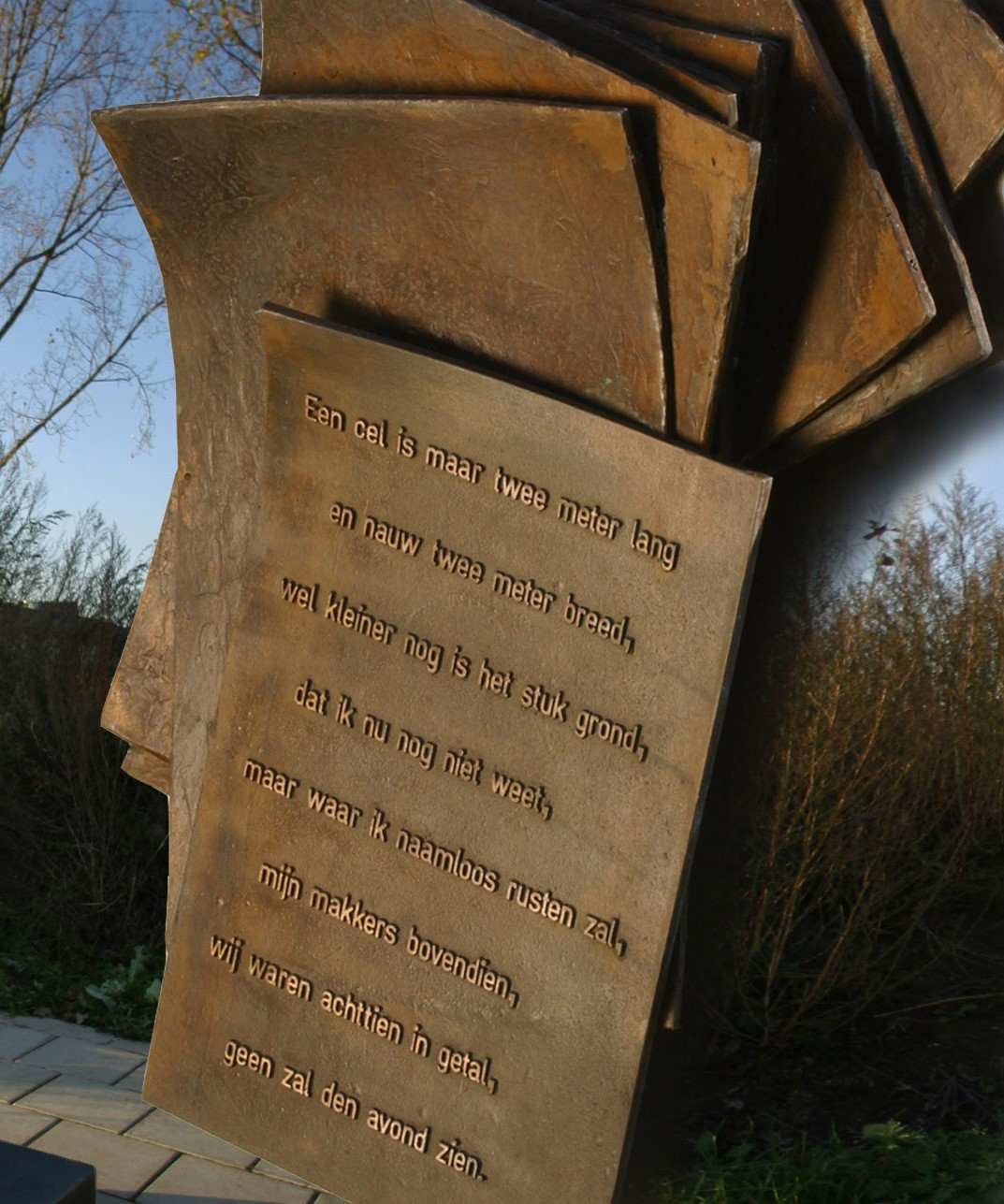
Memorial for Jan Campert by Helen Ferdinand, Spijkenisse. text reads: A cell is scarcely two meters long and barely two meters wide, still smaller is the plot of ground, I do not yet know, where I shall lie unnamed, my comrades too, we were eighteen in number, none will see the evening.

Jan Remco Theodoor Campert (Spijkenisse, 15 August 1902 – 12 January 1943) was a Dutch journalist, theater critic and writer who lived in Amsterdam. During the German occupation of the Netherlands in World War II Campert was arrested for aiding Jews. He was held in the Neuengamme concentration camp, where he died.

Campert is best known for his poem "Het lied der achttien dooden" ("The Song of the Eighteen Dead"), describing the execution of 18 resistance workers (15 resistance fighters and three communists) by the German occupier. Written in 1941 and based on an account published in Het Parool, the poem was clandestinely published in 1943 as a poetry card (rijmprent) by what became the De Bezige Bij publishing house to raise money to hide Jewish children.

He was the father of the novelist and poet Remco Campert.

The Jan Campert Prize is named after him.
