= De Nederlandse poëzie van de 19de en 20ste eeuw in 1000 en enige gedichten =

1979 anthology of Dutch poetry

De Nederlandse poëzie van de 19de en 20ste eeuw in 1000 en enige gedichten ("The Dutch poetry of the 19th and 20th century in 1000 and some poems") is a 1979 anthology of Dutch poetry. Compiled by poet and critic Gerrit Komrij and published by Bert Bakker, it quickly became a hotly discussed book and a yardstick for canonicity, nicknamed "The Bible of Dutch poetry". Controversy over Komrij's selection erupted almost immediately and even led to a lawsuit (which was quickly dismissed); it is generally agreed, though, that the anthology has had significant influence on the canon of Dutch poetry.

== Background ==
By the time he published the anthology, Komrij had established himself as a notable critic of literature and other cultural expressions, and as a poet had been honored with various awards (he won the poetry prize of the city of Amsterdam in 1970, for Alle vlees is als gras, and the Herman Gorter prize in 1982, for De os op de klokketoren). His own poetry, which critics sometimes found difficult to read and take seriously, was traditional in form and sometimes "bizarre-anecdotal" in content, very different from the formerly experimental poetry which, by the 1970s, had become the standard of Dutch poetry.

== Revisions and associated anthologies ==
By 1987 the book was in its eighth edition, and in 2004 a revised edition was published under the slightly altered title Nederlandse poëzie van de 19de t/m de 21ste eeuw in 2000 en enige gedichten.

Komrij published similar anthologies of 12th through 16th-century, and of 17th and 18th-century poetry, De Nederlandse poëzie van de 17de en 18de eeuw, in 1996. All three were bundled together in 1996, in 4100 pages, with an again-revised selection of the modern poetry.

== Inclusions and exclusions ==
As soon as the book appeared, poets and critics began counting: Komrij had set ten as the highest number of poems to be included by any single poet. Controversy erupted very quickly over his meager selection of poetry from the Vijftigers (article in Dutch), the experimental poetry movement of the post-World War II period. Simon Vinkenoog, for instance, who is frequently seen as the founder of the movement, only got one poem in. Members and apologists of that movement criticized Komrij for selecting too little from the Vijftigers, and for not selecting their best poems. J. Bernlef, for instance, lambasted Komrij's anthology as "willful attempt to sweep one of the most important poetic movements from the 20th century under the rug" in a newspaper review. Four of the country's best-known poets (Lucebert, Remco Campert, Gerrit Kouwenaar, and Bert Schierbeek) filed suit against Bert Bakker, irate that Komrij had not selected their best work and claiming that their publishers had not given permission for reproduction. The lawsuit was dismissed quickly, the judge ruling that such anthologies do not require copyright clearance if fewer than one hundred lines per copyright holder were printed.

That Afrikaner poet Elisabeth Eybers was not included is seen as evidence that the Dutch literary establishment is not sure how to treat her.

Noteworthy inclusions are the 19th-century poets frequently referred to pejoratively as "ministers" (they were theologians and Protestant ministers), the most notable example being Nicolaas Beets (others are Jan Jakob Lodewijk ten Kate, Petrus Augustus de Genestet, and Everhardus Johannes Potgieter). Komrij is credited with having restored those poets to canonicity—Beets, in the 1996 edition, was represented with 11 poems, causing one reviewer to joke that he had become the ubergod in Komrij's poetic pantheon.
