= Anton Martineau =

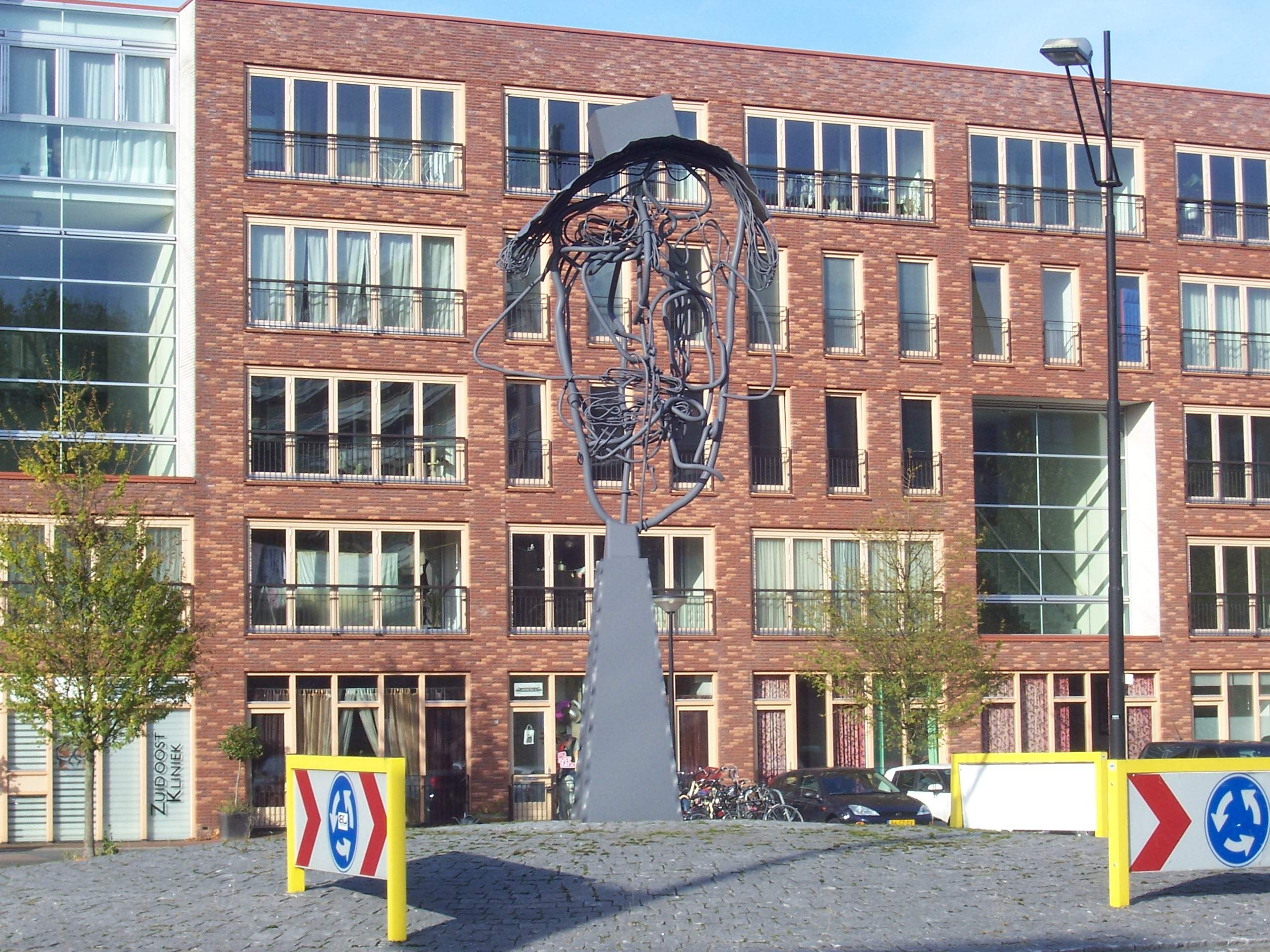
- Head with Four Noses (2008), Amsterdam-Zuidoost
- Born: Antoon Peter Johan Martineau; November 19, 1926; Amsterdam, Netherlands
- Died: March 11, 2017 (aged 90); Amsterdam, Netherlands
- Education: Royal Academy of Art, The Hague
- Known for: Painting, drawing, printmaking, sculpture, poetry
- Movement: Figurative expressionism
- Website: antonmartineau.nl

Antoon Peter Johan Martineau (19 November 1926 – 11 March 2017), known professionally as Anton Martineau, was a Dutch painter, printmaker, sculptor and poet. His work is associated with figurative expressionism and lyrical figuration.

== Early life and education ==
Martineau was born in Amsterdam and grew up near De Wallen. He learned decorative painting techniques from his father, a house painter. He later studied advertising and photography at the Royal Academy of Art, The Hague, where he was taught by Paul Schuitema. According to the Netherlands Institute for Art History, he also attended the Rijksakademie van beeldende kunsten in Amsterdam in 1946.

== Career ==
After the Second World War, Martineau travelled several times to France and stayed in Paris, where he came into contact with the experimental Dutch poets and artists known as the Vijftigers. In 1948 he travelled through France with Lucebert, with whom he also collaborated on murals near Paris.

His first exhibition was held in 1948 at the Paleis voor Volksvlijt in Amsterdam. Between 1950 and 1955 he worked in The Hague as a designer and painter for the advertising agency Enhabé. Later he settled in Amsterdam, where he worked for decades in a studio at Loods 6 on the KNSM-eiland.

Martineau's work consisted mainly of paintings, drawings and lithographs in an expressive figurative style. Recurring themes included human relationships, tango dancers, eroticism, love, death and still lifes. His work has been associated with the international movement of new figuration and showed affinities with Cobra. He was friends with artists such as Karel Appel, Corneille, Jan Sierhuis and poet Gerrit Kouwenaar.

In addition to painting, Martineau was active as a poet. He published his first poetry collection, Martineau, poëzie van een dubbeltalent, in 1992.

== Public works ==
Martineau created several works for public space in Amsterdam. In 1975 he designed Bijlmerman (officially Man met bonbondoos) near Ganzenhoef metro station in the Bijlmermeer. After the original sculpture disappeared during urban redevelopment, he created the replacement work Head with Four Noses (2008). In 2006 he designed a bronze urn monument commemorating historian Richter Roegholt at De Nieuwe Ooster cemetery.

== Teaching ==
Martineau taught painting at the Willem de Kooning Academy in Rotterdam from 1978 to 1988. He also taught at the Vrije Academie in The Hague and served as a guest lecturer at the Gerrit Rietveld Academie in Amsterdam.

== Awards ==
- Jacob Hartog Prize (1984)
- Artotheek Prize (1986)
- Groenmarkt Prize (1988)
- Pers Prize (1990)
- Van Ommeren-de Voogt Prize (1996)

== Selected exhibitions ==
- 2000 – Cobra Museum of Modern Art, Amstelveen
- 1991 – Avanti Galleries, New York City
- 1989 – Van Gogh Museum, Amsterdam
- 1976 – Museum Fodor, Amsterdam
- 1967 – Galerie Tadler, Paris
- 1959 – Musée d'Art Moderne de Paris, Biennale des Jeunes Artistes
