= Driek van Wissen =

Dutch poet (1943–2010)

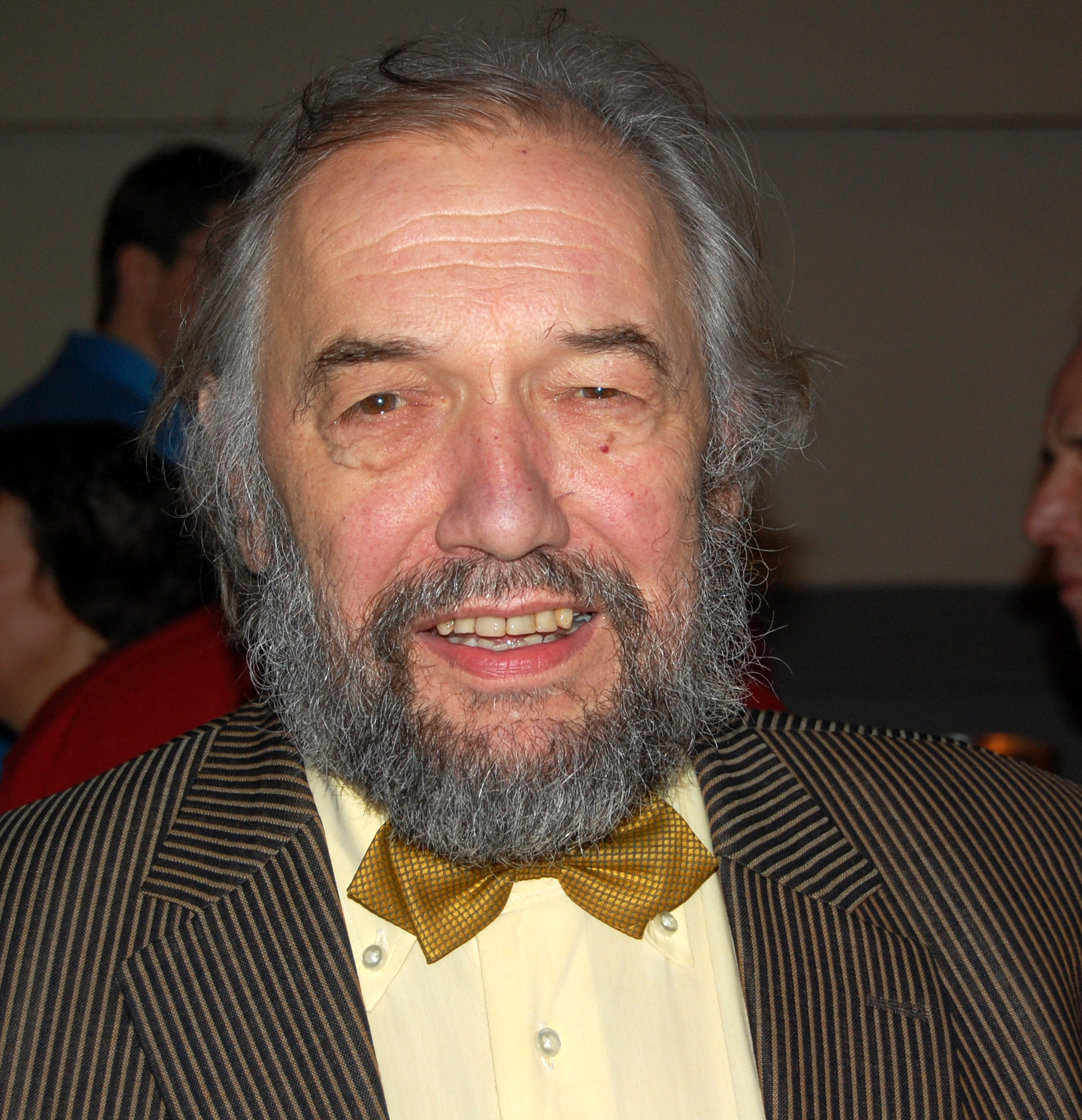
Driek van Wissen in 2010

Driek van Wissen (12 July 1943 – 21 May 2010) was a Dutch poet. He was born in Groningen. On 26 January 2005 he was chosen as the Dichter des Vaderlands (Poet Laureate of the Netherlands), following Gerrit Komrij. In 1987 the Dutch literary magazine De Tweede Ronde honored him by awarding him the Kees-Stip Prize for his career work and use of light verse. Van Wissen also published under the pen-name Albert Zondervan. He was a teacher in Hoogezand- Sappemeer at the Dr. Aletta Jacobs College from 1968 till 2005. He died in May 2010 in Istanbul.

Cultural offices
Preceded by Simon Vinkenoog a.i.	Dutch Poet Laureate "Dichter des Vaderlands"; 2005–2009	Succeeded by Ramsey Nasr
