= Toneelschrijfprijs =

Dutch-language literary award

- Awarded for: Dutch-language play
- Country: Flanders and the Netherlands
- Formerly called: Nederlands-Vlaamse Toneelschrijfprijs, Taalunie Toneelprijs
- First award: 1988; 38 years ago

The Toneelschrijfprijs is an annual literary award awarded to the playwrights of a Dutch-language play that debuted in the preceding season. The award ceremony is held in either Flanders or the Netherlands. The winner of the prize receives €10,000. The prize was first awarded in 1988 as the Nederlands-Vlaamse Toneelschrijfprijs.

The award was renamed in 1993 to Taalunie Toneelschrijfprijs and in 2018 to Toneelschrijfprijs. As of 2018, the prize is a collaboration between the Nederlandse Taalunie (Dutch Language Union), the Fonds Podiumkunsten, the Nederlands Letterenfonds and the Vlaams Fonds voor de Letteren.

== Winners ==
=== Nederlands-Vlaamse Toneelschrijfprijs ===
- 1988: Frans Strijards, Hitchcocks driesprong
- 1989: Judith Herzberg, Kras
- 1990: Arne Sierens, Mouchette
- 1990: Alex van Warmerdam, Het Noorderkwartier
- 1991: Jan Decorte, Meneer, de zot en het kind
- 1992: Suzanne van Lohuizen, Het huis van mijn leven and Heb je mijn kleine jongen gezien

=== Taalunie Toneelschrijfprijs ===
- 1993: Tom Jansen, SCHADE/Schade
- 1994: Karst Woudstra, De stille grijzen van een winterse dag in Oostende
- 1995: Koos Terpstra, De Troje Trilogie
- 1996: Rob de Graaf, 2Skin
- 1997: Geertui Daem, Het moederskind
- 1998: Peer Wittenbols, April (1864 - 1889)
- 1999: Paul Pourveur, Stiefmoeders
- 2000: Ramsey Nasr, Geen lied
- 2001: Luk Perceval and Peter Verhelst, Aars!
- 2002: Peter de Graef, Niks
- 2003: Jeroen van den Berg, Blowing
- 2004: David Van Reybrouck, Die Siel van die Mier
- 2005: Anna Enquist, Antoine Uitdehaag and Anne Vegter, Struisvogels op de Coolsingel
- 2006: Kris Cuppens, Lied
- 2007: Rob de Graaf, Vrede
- 2008: Filip Vanluchene, Citytrip
- 2009: Stijn Devillé, Hitler is dood
- 2010: Lot Vekemans, Gif
- 2011: Alex van Warmerdam, Bij het kanaal naar links
- 2012: Ad de Bont, Mehmet de Veroveraar
- 2013: Bernard Dewulf, Een lolita
- 2014: Freek Vielen, Dracula
- 2015: Freek Mariën, Wachten en andere heldendaden
- 2016: Magne van den Berg, Ik speel geen Medea
- 2017: Ilja Leonard Pfeijffer, De advocaat

=== Toneelschrijfprijs ===
- 2018: Eric de Vroedt, The Nation
- 2019: Nima Mohaghegh and Saman Amini, A Seat at the Table
- 2020: Casper Vandeputte and Vincent van der Valk, Immens
- 2021: Not awarded due to COVID-19 pandemic
- 2022: Mathieu Wijdeven and Raoul de Jong, Het waarom beantwoord
- 2023: Maarten van Hinte, Queen of Disco
