= Vaandrager =

Vaandrager is a surname. Notable people with the surname include:

- Cor Vaandrager, Dutch footballer who played for Zwart-Wit '28 (1962–1972)
- Cornelis Bastiaan Vaandrager (1935–1992), Dutch writer and poet
- Wiljon Vaandrager (born 1957), Dutch rower
