= Jan Hanlo =

Dutch poet and writer

Jan Hanlo, in full Johannes Bernardus Maria Raphael Hanlo (Bandung, Dutch East Indies, 29 May 1912 - Maastricht, Netherlands 16 June 1969) was a Dutch poet and writer. The son of a judge in the Dutch East Indies, Hanlo grew up with his mother, who was a Roman Catholic bigot, in Deurne, later in Valkenburg aan de Geul, both in the south of the Netherlands. From 1942-1958 he lived in Amsterdam, where he grew to be interested in poetry and was associated with the experimental group of the Vijftigers, although he was an outsider in that group. In 1951 his first book op poems was published, The varnished - Het geverniste.

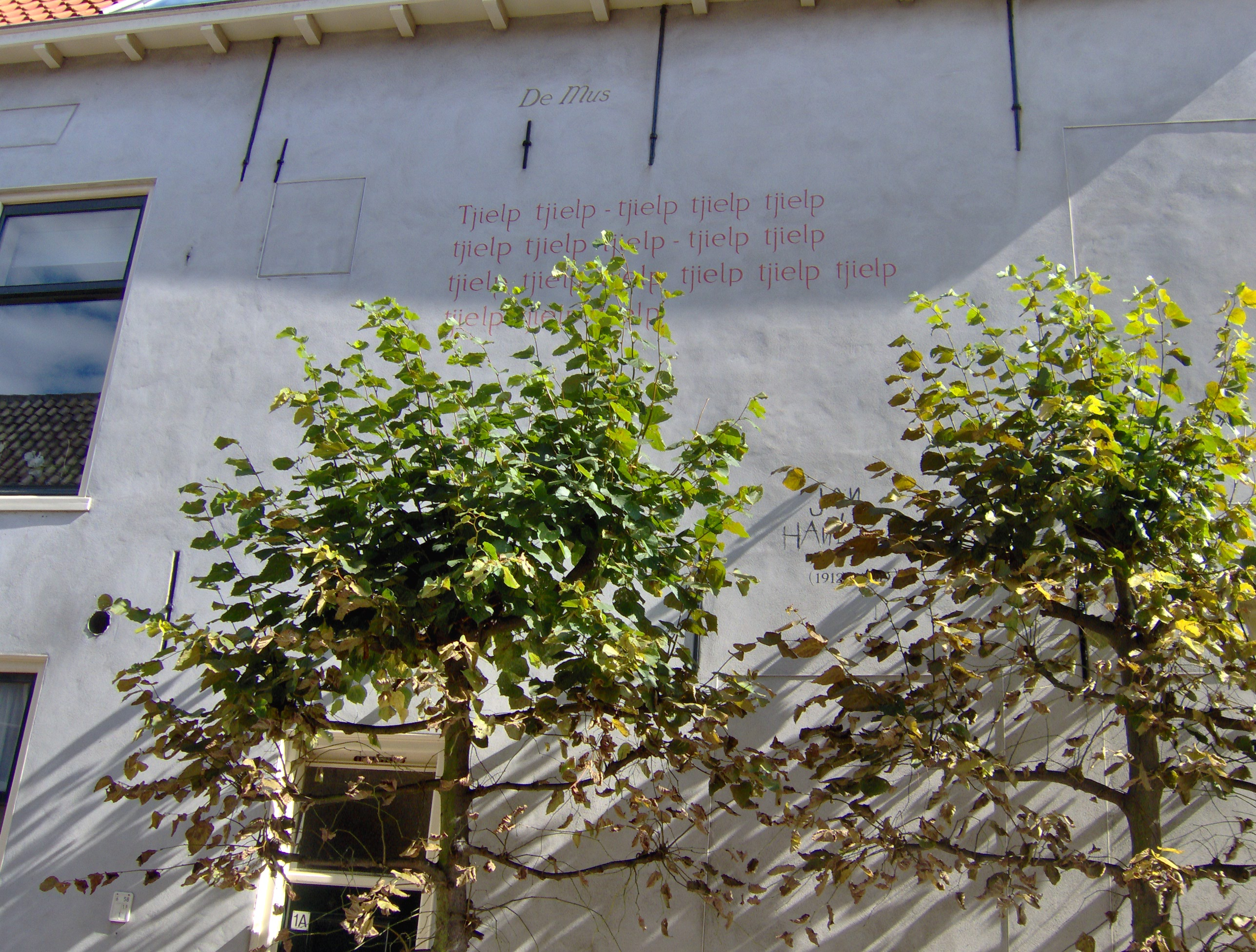
Poem De mus on a wall in Leiden

His most famous poem, 'Oote', meant as a rendering of children's speak in written sounds, was published in 1952. It resulted in a minor scandal, when it was read aloud in the Dutch parliament as an example of art that should not be subsidized by the government. For the most part, Hanlo's work is less experimental. Its recurring themes are beauty and innocence. Hanlo was an amiable, shy man, who found pleasure in relating with boys. Alleged homosexual acts brought him into contact with the law. Because of this he was treated in mental hospitals, and according to his 1998 biography, Hanlo was castrated.

In the end of the 1950s he started writing prose. He died after his motorcycle collided into a lorry. After his death, more of his prose was published and his correspondence. Jan Hanlo is still a valued Dutch author, his poems have been put to music several times. Some of his poems were used to adorn walls, for instance in the Wall poems in Leiden project.
