= Schauspiel Bochum =

Theatre in Germany

Schauspielhaus Bochum
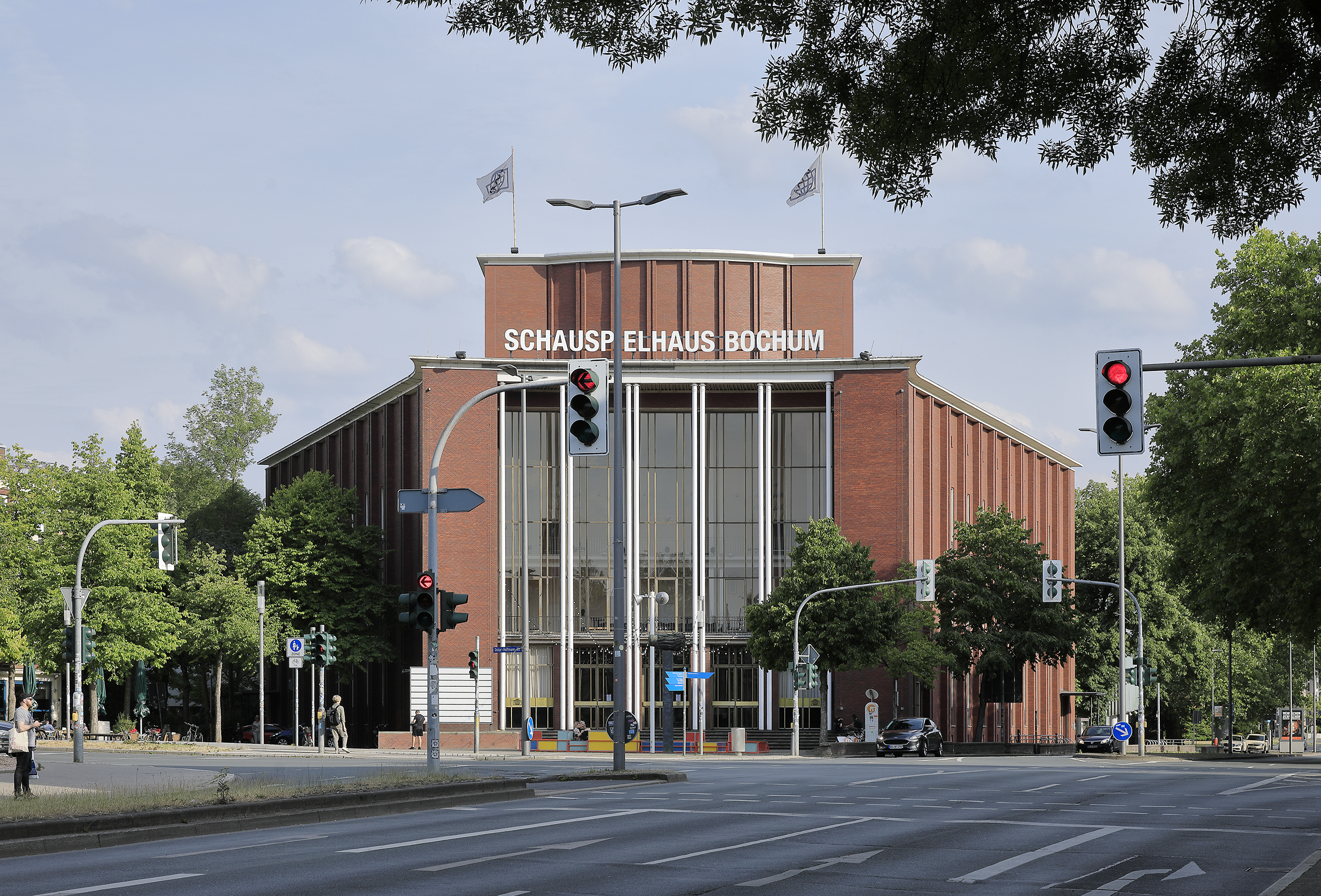
- Schauspielhaus Bochum in 2019
- Interactive map of Schauspielhaus Bochum
- Location: Bochum, Germany
- Coordinates: 51°28′21″N 7°13′00″E
- Type: Theatre

Website
- schauspielhausbochum.de

The Schauspielhaus Bochum is one of the notable drama theatres in Germany. It is located on Königsallee in Bochum, North Rhine-Westphalia. Eric de Vroedt is an established guest director at the theatre.
