= Bob den Uyl =

Dutch writer

Jacob (Bob) den Uyl (27 March 1930, Rotterdam – 13/14 February, 1992 Rotterdam) was a Dutch writer of mostly short stories. His writing style is mostly ironic and observant. The most prominent theme in his work is the purposelessness and absurdity of existence. His earlier work consists mostly of absurd stories. In his later work, the focus of his writing shifted to more autobiographic stories, mostly concerned with travels (by bicycle) in neighbouring countries of The Netherlands. Recurring elements in his work are:

- His experiences as a child during World War II
- World War I
- His love for bicycle racing
- His alcohol use
- The city of Rotterdam

During his lifetime Den Uyl won the following prizes in literature:

- In 1965, the “Prozaprijs” conferred by the city of Amsterdam for 'Vogels Kijken'
- In 1968, the “Anna Blaman Prijs” for 'Een zachte fluittoon'
- In 1976, the “Multatuli-prijs” for 'Gods wegen zijn duister en zelden aangenaam'

In 2004, the editorial board of the VPRO-Gids established the Bob den Uyl prize for travel stories. Several collected stories have been posthumously published. In 2008, Nico Keuning published Bob den Uyl's biography.
