= Anna Blaman Prijs =

Dutch literary award

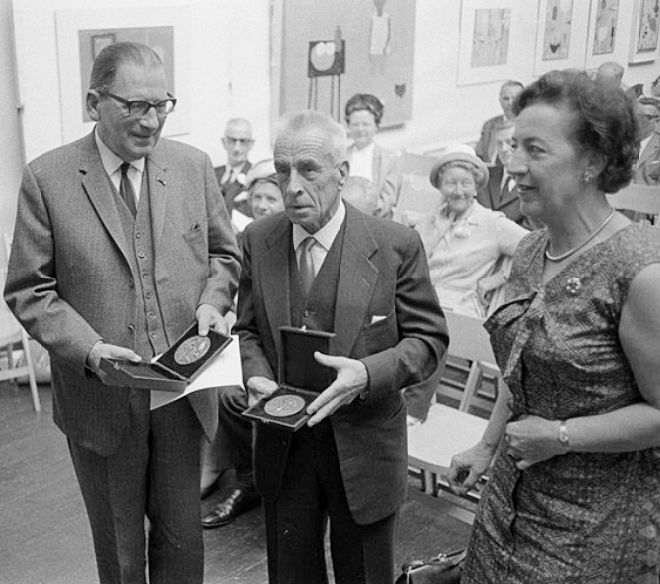
Anna Blaman Prijs being awarded to Willem Adriaan Wagener (left, with glasses) in 1967.

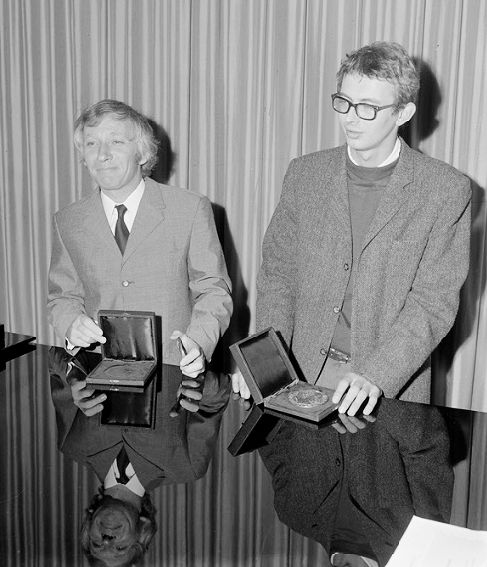
Anna Blaman Prijs being awarded to Leyn Leijnse (right, with glasses) in 1969.

The Anna Blaman Prijs (Dutch for Anna Blaman Prize) is a Dutch literary award created by the Prins Bernhard Cultuurfonds. The award is named after Dutch writer and poet Anna Blaman. The award is only given to those who either live or work or have a close connection with the city of Rotterdam. The award is given once every three years.

The award was established in 1965 and first awarded in 1966. Early on, the award was given for a specific work but as of 1981 the award is given for someone's entire oeuvre. As of 2015, the award is organised by the Passionate Bulkboek organisation.

As of 2019, the Anna Blaman Prijs and the Hendrik Chabot Prijs (for visual arts) are the two remaining awards for the Rotterdam area created by the Prins Bernhard Cultuurfonds. As of 2016, the Elly Ameling Prijs (for music) is no longer awarded and the Prins Bernhard Cultuurfonds only awards Cultuurprijs Zuid-Holland every other year. The Hendrik Chabot Prijs is now organised and awarded by the Chabot Museum.

== Winners ==
- 1966 - Adriaan van der Veen, Een idealist
- 1967 - Willem Adriaan Wagener
- 1968 - Bob den Uyl, Een zachte fluittoon
- 1969 - Leyn Leijnse, Afrika sterft in den vreemde
- 1971 - Herman Romer, Voor de liefhebbers
- 1974 - Jacobus P. Bos, De dagelijkse geest
- 1981 - Cornelis Bastiaan Vaandrager
- 1988 - Jules Deelder
- 1990 - Frank Koenegracht
- 1992 - J.W. Oerlemans
- 1994 - Jan Eijkelboom
- 1996 - Marcel Möring
- 1998 - Theo Verhaar
- 2001 - Hester Knibbe
- 2004 - Anne Vegter
- 2007 - Rien Vroegindeweij
- 2010 - Ester Naomi Perquin
- 2013 - Sanneke van Hassel
- 2016 - Hans Sleutelaar
- 2019 - Edward van de Vendel
- 2022 - Raoul de Jong
