= Lieke Marsman =

Dutch poet (1990–2026)

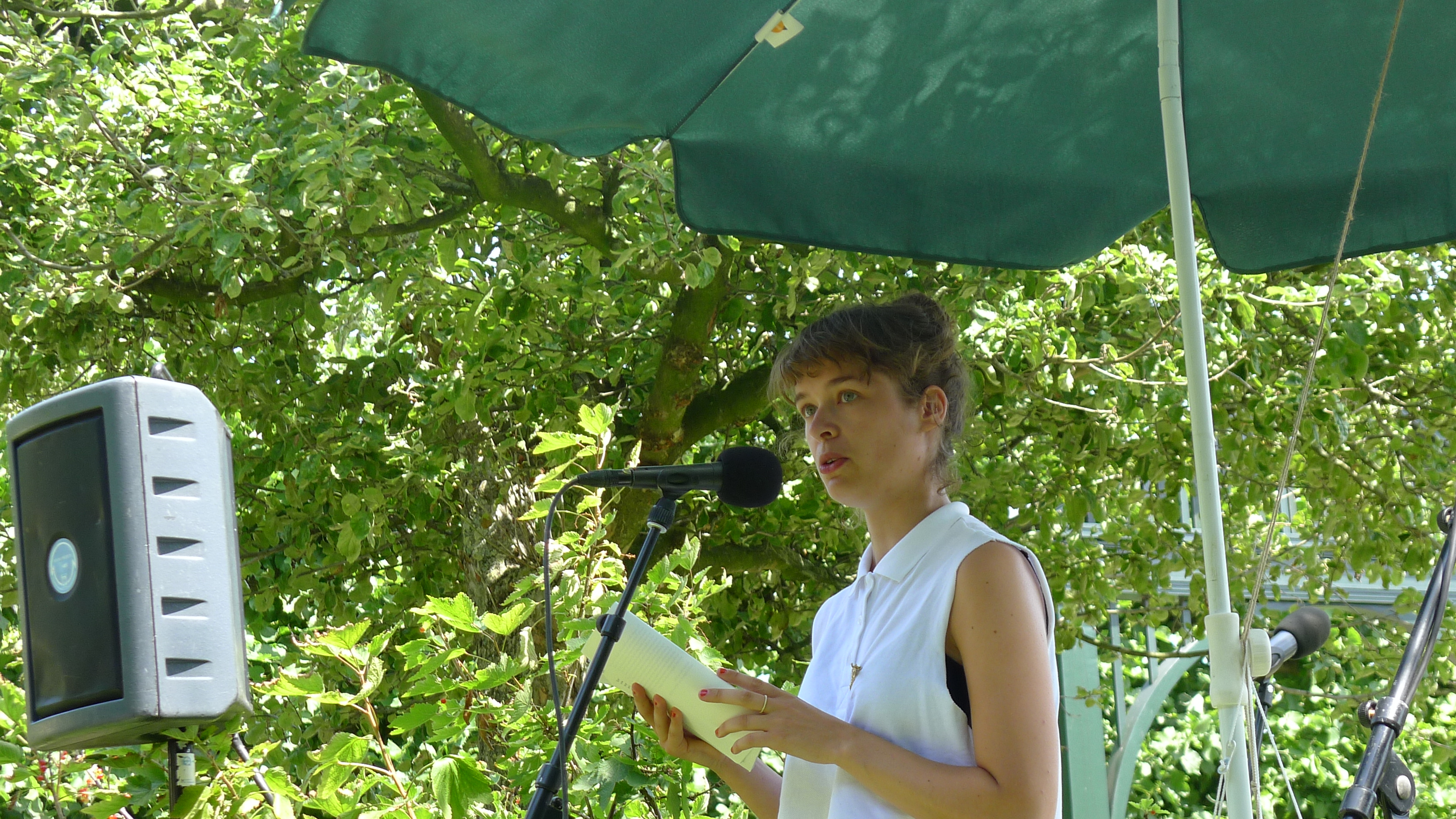
- Marsman in 2014
- Born: Lieke Anne-Marie Marsman; 25 July 1990; Den Bosch, Netherlands
- Died: 3 June 2026 (aged 35); Paris, France
- Occupation: Poet
- Writing career
- Genre: Poetry
- Website: liekemarsman.nl

Lieke Anne-Marie Marsman (25 July 1990 – 3 June 2026) was a Dutch poet. She was the Dutch Poet Laureate (Dichter der Nederlanden) for the period 2021 to 2023.

== Life and career ==
Lieke Marsman was born on 25 July 1990 in Den Bosch and grew up in Zaltbommel and did her final school exams in 2008 at the Cambium College. After that she studied philosophy at the University of Amsterdam. Her first publications were included in De Gids and Vrij Nederland. Via a blog on the website Tirade.nu she commentated and translated the work of her contemporaries.

In 2010 her debut collection of poems appeared with the title [Wat ik mijzelf graag voorhoud]. It received three literary prizes in 2011 and more than 3,000 editions were sold. Between January 2013 and March 2015 Marsman was part of the editorial team of the literary journal Tirade. Her second collection The First Letter [De eerste letter] appeared in January 2014 and treated various themes, including panic attacks. In June 2017 two of her books were published at the same time: her first novel, The Opposite of a Person [Het tegenovergestelde van een mens], which interwove poetry and essays; and Man with Hat [Man met hoed], her collected poems and a selection of translations.

In April 2018, a malignant bone tumour was discovered in her upper back; a (successful) operation was needed to remove it. As a consequence, Marsman could still move her right arm, but no longer raise it. In The following scan lasts 5 minutes [De volgende scan duurt 5 minuten], that appeared in September 2018, she described the process and the political context of illness. This collection was translated into English by British poet Sophie Collins, who grew up in Bergen (North Holland).

In January 2021, Marsman published the poetry collection In my basket [In mijn mand]. In the same months she was named as Dutch Poet Laureate Dichter des Vaderlands for the period 2021 to 2023, following Tsead Bruinja.

In July 2022 her right arm and shoulder were amputated—the operations on her cancer had not been able to prevent further spread of the disease. On 14 August 2022, she was a guest on the VPRO programme Zomergasten, interviewed by Janine Abbring about her life, poetry and illness.

In 2025 her book Op een andere planeet kunnen ze me redden [On Another Planet They Can Save Me] appeared, a philosophical journey into the depths of the human mind, interspersed with diary entries describing how death is hot on her heels. Also in 2025, Marsman received the Constantijn Huygens Prize for her life's work. The book was translated in English in October 2026 by Sophie Collins and published as On Another Planet They Can Save Me.

Marsman died of cancer on 3 June 2026, at the age of 35, a week before her last book, De dichter en de duivel [The Poet and the Devil] was scheduled to appear.
