= Marcel Möring =

Dutch writer (born 1957)

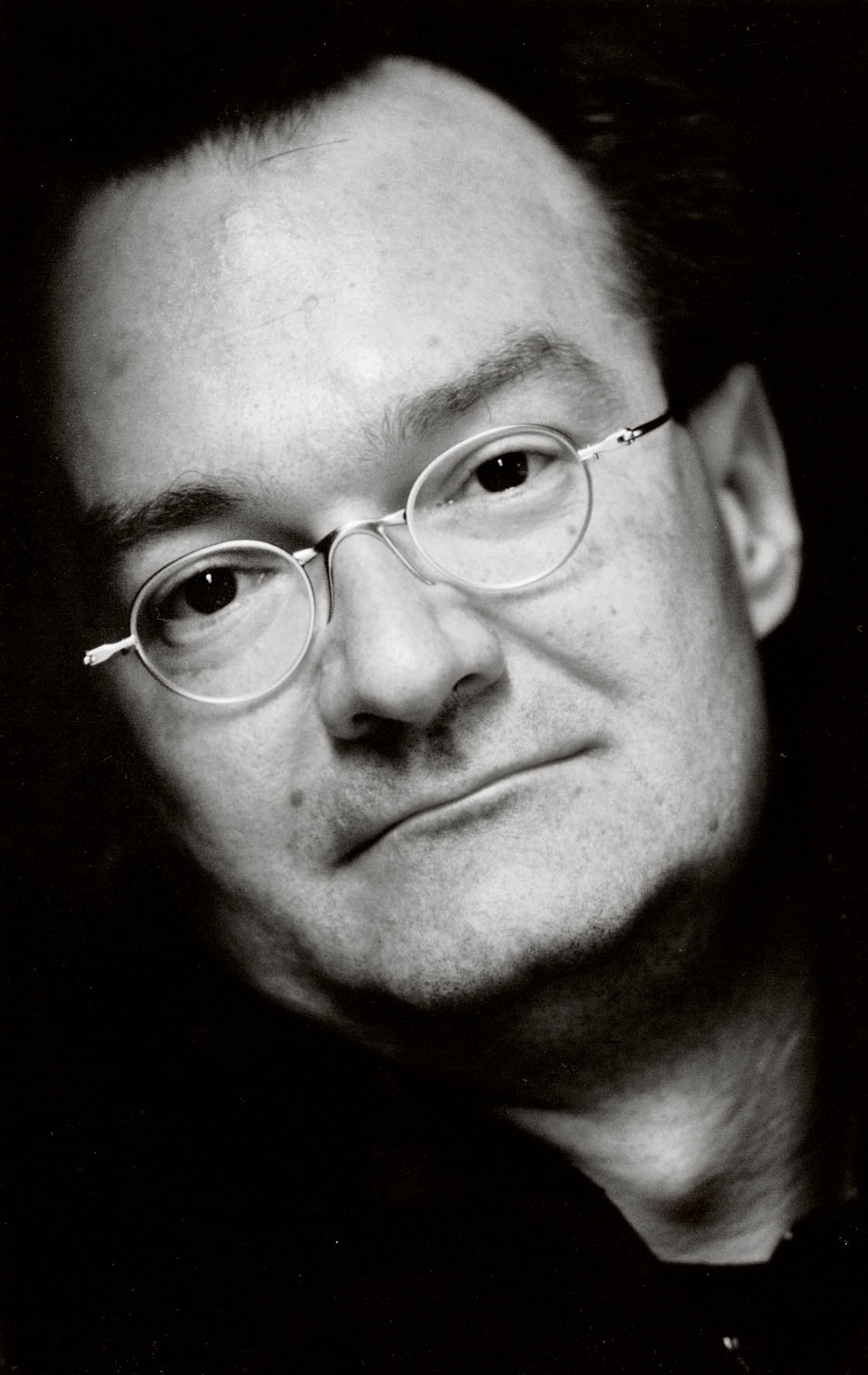
Marcel Möring.

Marcel Möring (born 5 September 1957, in Enschede) is a Dutch writer. He received the Ferdinand Bordewijk Prijs in 2007 for his novel Dis, translated into English under the title In A Dark Wood.

He received the Anna Blaman Prijs in 1996.

== Novels ==
- Moring, Marcel. My India: A Novel About India. ISBN 9781790742660.
- Moring, Marcel. The Survivor: A Novel Based on a True Holocaust Survivor Story. ISBN 9781790743384.
- Moring, Marcel. The Holocaust: A Novella About a True Miracle in the Holocaust. ISBN 9781790894987.
- Moring, Marcel. Innocence: A Novel of Innocence, Naivety and Love. ISBN 9781790895007.
- Moring, Marcel. The Teacher: A Novel of a Remarkable Student-Teacher Relationship. ISBN 9781790895038.
- Moring, Marcel. After the Storm: A Novel. ISBN 9781790895045.
- Moring, Marcel. The Revenge: A Romantic Thriller. ISBN 9781790895069.
- Comment ça je dis pas dors, 2009
- C'est toi le business, 2005
- Le rouge c’est chaud, Vacarme 28, Summer 2004 (Prose).
- Niente, Vacarme 26, Winter 2004 (Prose).
- Malécot, éditions contrat maint, 2003,
- Summer is ready when you are, with Françoise Quardon and Jean-Pierre Rehm, éditions joca seria, 2002
- pose-moi une question difficile, éditions rup&rud, 2002, ISBN 2-908929-32-5
- Arrête maintenant, éditions l’Attente, 2001
- Je veux être physique, Farrago, 2000, ISBN 2-84490-047-X
  - A series of storyless playlets: "Va Cherche les mots mais comment les trouver" is, for example, a reflection on poetry.
- La réalité en face/la quoi ?, Al Dante/RROZ, 1999. (in collaboration with Anne Portugal)
