= Cornelis Bastiaan Vaandrager =

Dutch poet and writer (1935-1992)

Cornelis Bastiaan Vaandragere
- Born: Cornelis Bastiaan Vaandrager; 26 August 1935; Rotterdam, Netherlands
- Died: 18 March 1992 (aged 56); Rotterdam, Netherlands
- Occupation: Writer
- Partner: Hetty Smink
- Writing career
- Pen name: C.B. Vaandrager; Vaan
- Language: Dutch
- Years active: 1950s–1992
- Genres: Novels, short stories, poems, letters, speeches
- Notable awards: Anna Blaman Prijs (1981)
- Website: www.dbnl.org/auteurs/auteur.php?id=vaan001

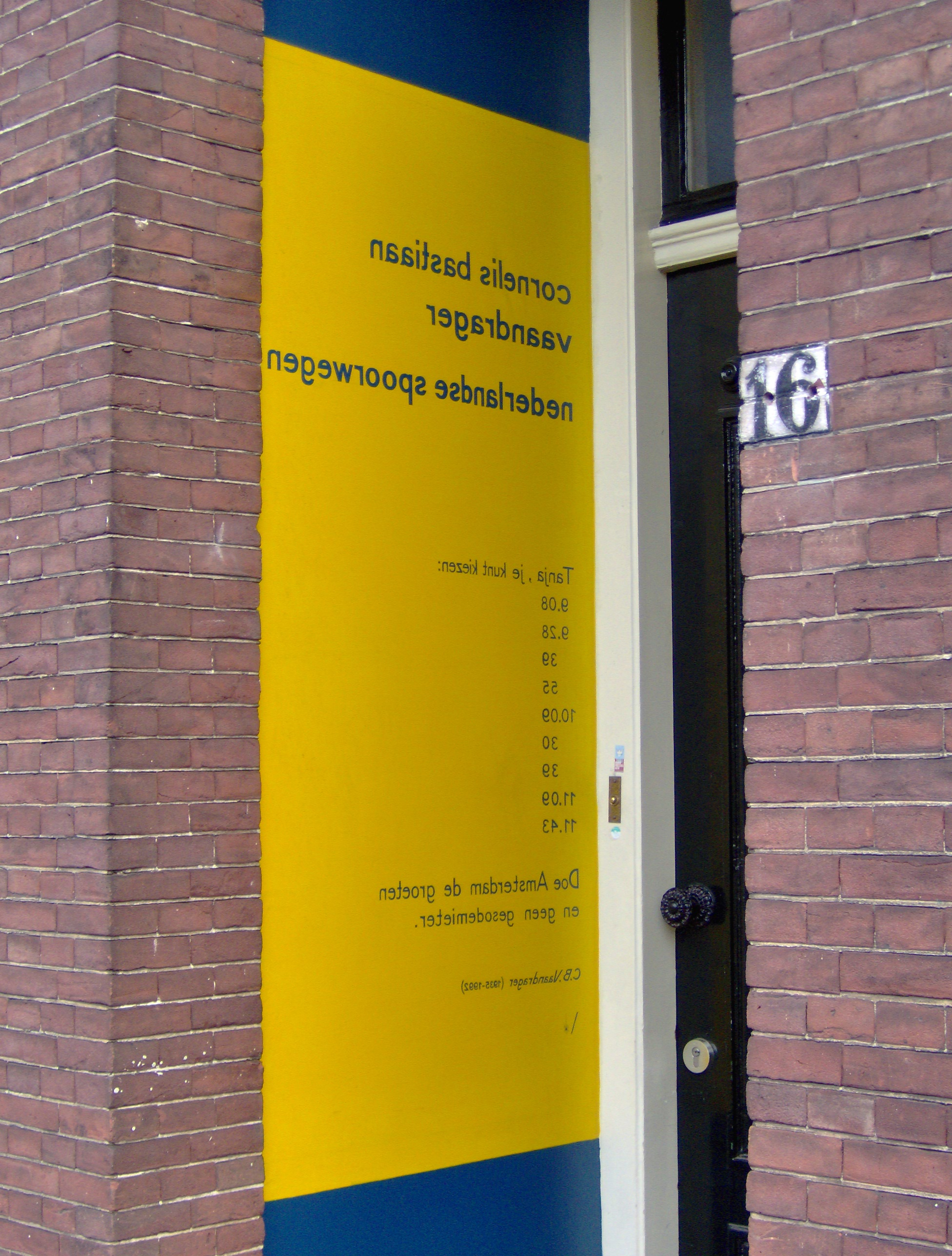
Wall poem in the porch of the building at the Morsweg 16 in Leiden, The Netherlands

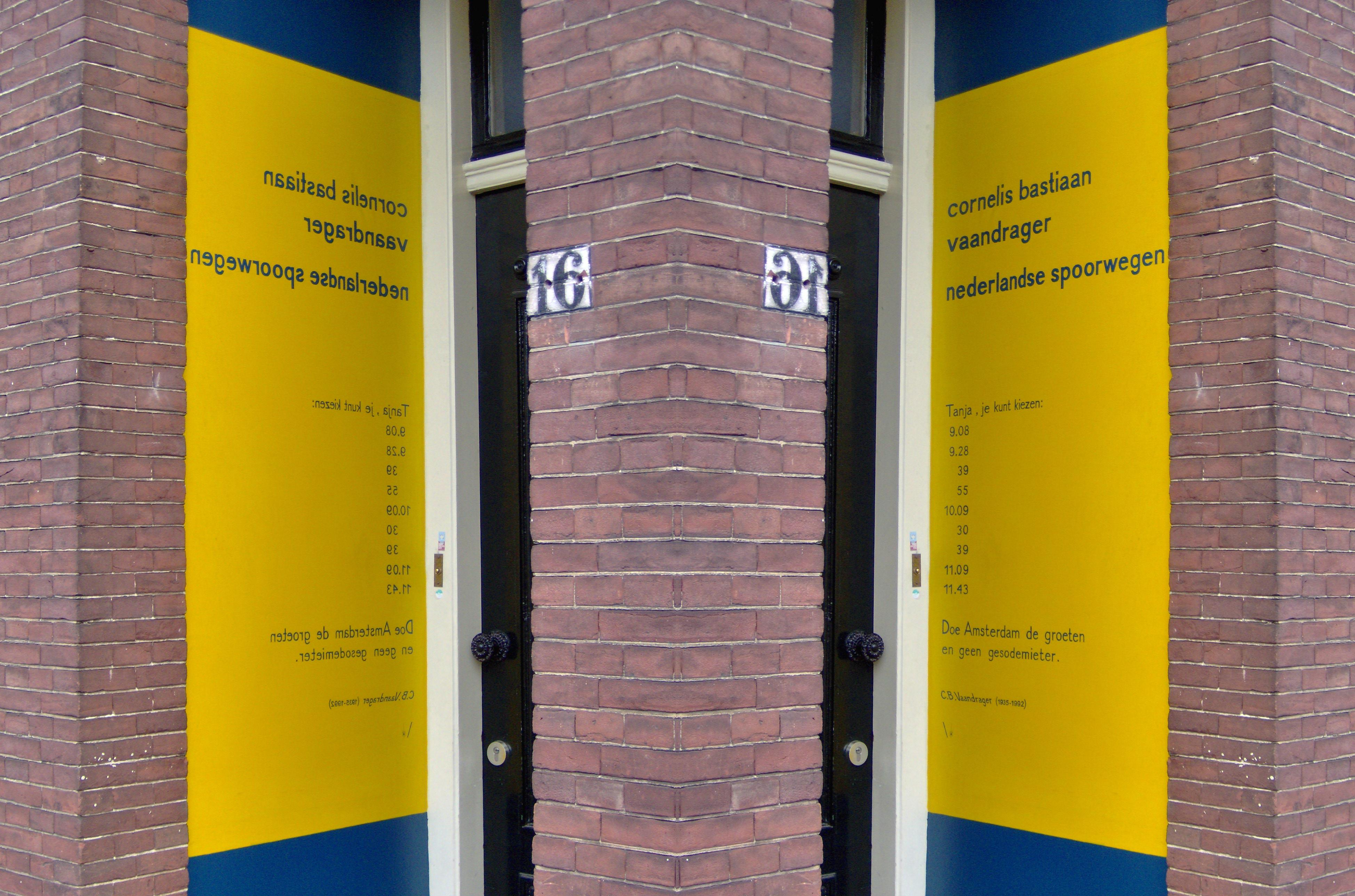
Wall poem in Leiden with a mirror on the other side of the porch, which makes the poem readable

Cornelis Bastiaan Vaandrager (26 August 1935, in Rotterdam – 18 March 1992, in Rotterdam), who generally published with only his initials as C. B. Vaandrager, was a Dutch writer and poet who lived and worked in Rotterdam. Later he came to be known simply by the shortened version of his name as Vaan.

Vaandrager was a leading writer, along with Hans Sleutelaar and Armando, in the group of experimental Dutch writers called De Zestigers (The Sixtiers), who were preceded by De Vijftigers.

== Life and work ==
=== Youth, education and early career ===
Vaandrager was born in the Pretorialaan in southern Rotterdam in 1935. His father was a postman and van driver, his mother a housewife. The family moved when he was six to the Brielselaan, where he grew up. He was a brilliant student at the Charlois Lyceum, where he received a straight A at his exam for his Greek translations of Homer and Herodotus. The principal urged him to go on to university, but Vaandrager opted to become a trendsetting poet, writer and artist.

After his military service Vaandrager started working as copywriter for a local newspaper, and later for some publicity agencies. In the new paper Het Parool he published his first children's story in 1958. He joined the artistic scene, taking part in the café night life with his school friend Hans Sleutelaar and such emerging pop artists as Woody van Amen and Daan van Golden.

Late in the 1950s, together with Sleutelaar and painter-poet Armando, he joined the editorial board of the Flemish-Dutch literary magazine Gard Sivik (1955–64), which was then relocated from Antwerp to Rotterdam. Later the three were joined by the poet Hans Verhagen in starting the new magazine De Nieuwe Stijl (1965–66).

=== Work ===
In 1960 Vaandrager made his prose debut with his 60-page coming of age story, Leve Joop Massaker (Long Live Joop Massaker), which was compared by critics to novels by Gerard Reve and Hugo Claus. A year later came his poetry debut, Met andere ogen (With other eyes). With those works he established his name as a promising local literary talent.

Vaandrager set his face against literary pretension and identified his work with the "dislocating, raw city mentality of punk and New Wave". In the preface to his 1967 collection of poems (Gedichten) he claimed "not to give a shit about poetry". Like several others in his generation, he took inspiration from Marcel Duchamp’s concept of the readymade. At the heart of his "Dutch Railways", for example, there is a railway schedule, given context by the opening line "Tanya, it's up to you" and those following the train times: "Say hello to Amsterdam/ and no messing around". The poem tells a story without descending into the anecdotal. Similarly, in "Tourist Traffic" the mind plays over three statements that juxtapose a river in motion and a moving bridge in "Fluent Dutch/ Fluent English and/ Fluent German".

The element of collage also carried over into Vaandrager's 1970s prose works, including the highly autobiographical documentary novels: De reus van Rotterdam: Stadsgeheimen (The Rotterdam Giant, 1971) and De hef (The Head, 1975), detailing the city's musical and literary scene during the sixties. The two works were later issued together in 2002. Another such work from the same period, the 'street-collage' Sleutels (Keys, 2012) was only published posthumously.

=== Later decline and death ===
Vaandrager's life was now going downhill. Drug use began to dominate his life, as a result of which he became labelled as "the junky writer". With severe clinical depression, he sometimes spent months in a psychiatric hospital. In 1981 he was awarded the Anna Blaman Prize from the Prince Bernhard Fund for his entire work. Afterwards Vaandrager published only a few poetry collections, including Metalon (1987) and Sampleton (1990).

As a wandering eccentric, Vaandrager died lonely in 1992 at the age of 56.

== Publications ==
=== Poetry ===
- Met andere ogen (1961)
- Gedichten, De Bezige Bij, Amsterdam, 1967
- Martin, waarom hebbe de giraffe... , Rotterdam, 1973
- Totale poëzie, De Bezige Bij, Amsterdam,1981
- In staat van oproer, Rotturdamse gedigte, Rotterdam, 1987.
- Metalon, De Bezige Bij, Amsterdam, 1987
- Sampleton, De Bezige Bij, Amsterdam,1990
- Made in Rotterdam (collected poems), Amsterdam, 2008

=== Prose ===
- Leve Joop Massaker (1960)
- De avonturen van Cornelis Bastiaan Vaandrager I, 1963
- De reus van Rotterdam (1971)
- De Hef (1975)
- Sleutels – a 'street-collage', (2012)
- De Ramblers gaan uit vissen – collected stories, incorporating Leve Joop Massaker (2017)

Publications about Vaandrager

- "C.B. Vaandrager Special". In: Passionate, jrg. 9 (2002) nr. 2 (March–April)
- Erik Brus ed. Vaan nu. C.B. Vaandrager met andere ogen. Rotterdam, Studio Kers, 2017. ISBN 978-94-91835-04-9
- Menno Schenke: Vaan. Het bewogen bestaan van C.B. Vaandrager (biography). Amsterdam, De Bezige Bij, 2005
