= Jo Peters Poëzieprijs =

The Jo Peters Poëzieprijs ("Jo Peters Poetry Award") is a Dutch biennial award given to beginning poets. The award includes a monetary prize of E2500 and the publication of a collection of new poems.

The award is named for Jo Peters (1937-2001), the former publisher and poetry editor of the literary press Herik. It is awarded to poets who have published no more than two collections, and the monetary prize is awarded in two installments: one on the night of the award ceremony (the "Evening of New Poetry", in the Dutch town of Landgraaf, and the other a year later, on the occasion of the publication of a set of new poems, published in a limited, bibliophilic edition.

== Past winners ==
- Kira Wuck, Finse meisjes (2014)
- Marjolijn van Heemstra, Als Mozes had doorgevraagd (2012)
- Ester Naomi Perquin, Namens de Ander (2010)
- Edwin Fagel, Uw afwezigheid (2008)
- Jan-Willem Anker, Inzinkingen (2006)
- Hagar Peeters, Koffers zeelucht (2004)
- Alfred Schaffer, Zijn opkomst in voorstad (2002)
