= Dichter der Nederlanden =

Unofficial title for Dutch poet laureate

Dichter der Nederlanden (Poet of the Netherlands), previously Dichter des Vaderlands (Poet of the Fatherland), is an unofficial title for the Poet laureate of the Netherlands. This position was created by the Dutch newspaper NRC Handelsblad, the Nederlandse Programma Stichting and the foundation Poetry International in January 2000. The Dichter der Nederlanden's poetry represents the spirit of the Dutch people and culture. As of 2026, the current position holder is Nisrine Mbarki.

== List of Dichters der Nederlanden ==
- 2000–04 Gerrit Komrij
- 2004–05 Simon Vinkenoog (ad interim)
- 2005–09 Driek van Wissen
- 2009–13 Ramsey Nasr
- 2013–17 Anne Vegter
- 2017–19 Ester Naomi Perquin
- 2019–21 Tsead Bruinja
- 2021–23 Lieke Marsman
- 2023–25 Babs Gons
- 2026–28 Nisrine Mbarki

== See also ==
- Culture of the Netherlands
- Dutch Language
