= Eric de Vroedt =

Dutch theater director, writer and actor (born 1972)

- Born: 1972 (age 52–53)
- Education: Arnhem School of Acting
- Notable work: The Nation
- Awards: Toneelschrijfprijs

Eric de Vroedt (Rotterdam, 1972) is a Dutch theater director, writer and actor.

== Career ==
After his graduation from the Arnhem School of Acting in 1996 he realized his ambition was to be a director and writer rather than an actor.

He is an established guest director at Toneelgroep Amsterdam and Schauspielhaus Bochum in Germany, and has directed for Theater Dortmund. At Toneelgroep Amsterdam he directs plays predominantly from an Anglo-Sakson repertoire. For the German theaters, he elects plays from a repertoire of Dutch works instead. His plays are a reflection on current socio-political issues, in the form of a satire. His plays are hyper realistic, where humor and earnestness are intertwined.

His most famous work is the mightysociety-project, started in 2004.

The National Theatre (Nationale Toneel) in The Hague appointed Eric de Vroedt as their new artistic leader.

== Awards ==
In 2018 he received the Toneelschrijfprijs for his play The Nation.

== Mightysociety ==
Mightysociety is a series of ten plays about current issues De Vroedt wrote and directed himself. The series started in 2004 with mightysociety1 about spin-doctors. The project ended in 2012 with mightysociety10, dealing with his own father and the developing economy in Indonesia. Topics De Vroedt discussed in his plays were, among others: Political populism, terrorism, the Global Age, the war in Afghanistan and ageing. De Vroedt won the Amsterdam Award for his mightysociety-project, an award for remarkable art in the Netherlands. Four of the plays in the mightysociety-series were also selected for the Dutch Theater Festival.

== Directing (excerpt) ==
- mightysociety1 - 10 (2004–2012)
- Long Day's Journey into Night (Eugene O'Neill) (2005)
- A Streetcar Named Desire (Tennessee Williams) (Toneelgroep Amsterdam, 2008)
- Glengarry Glen Ross (David Mamet) (Toneelgroep Amsterdam, 2009)
- Na de zondeval (After the fall - Arthur Miller) (Toneelgroep Amsterdam, 2012)
- Die Restposten (mightysociety 4)(Theater Dortmund, 2013)
- Freitag (Hugo Claus) (Schauspielhaus Bochum, 2014)
- De Entertainer (John Osborne) (Toneelgroep Amsterdam, 2014)
- Koningin Lear (Queen Lear, based on Shakespeare) (Toneelgroep Amsterdam, 2015)
- Leas Hochzeit (The Wedding Party - Judith Herzberg) (Schauspielhaus Bochum, 2015)
