= Hester Knibbe =

Dutch poet

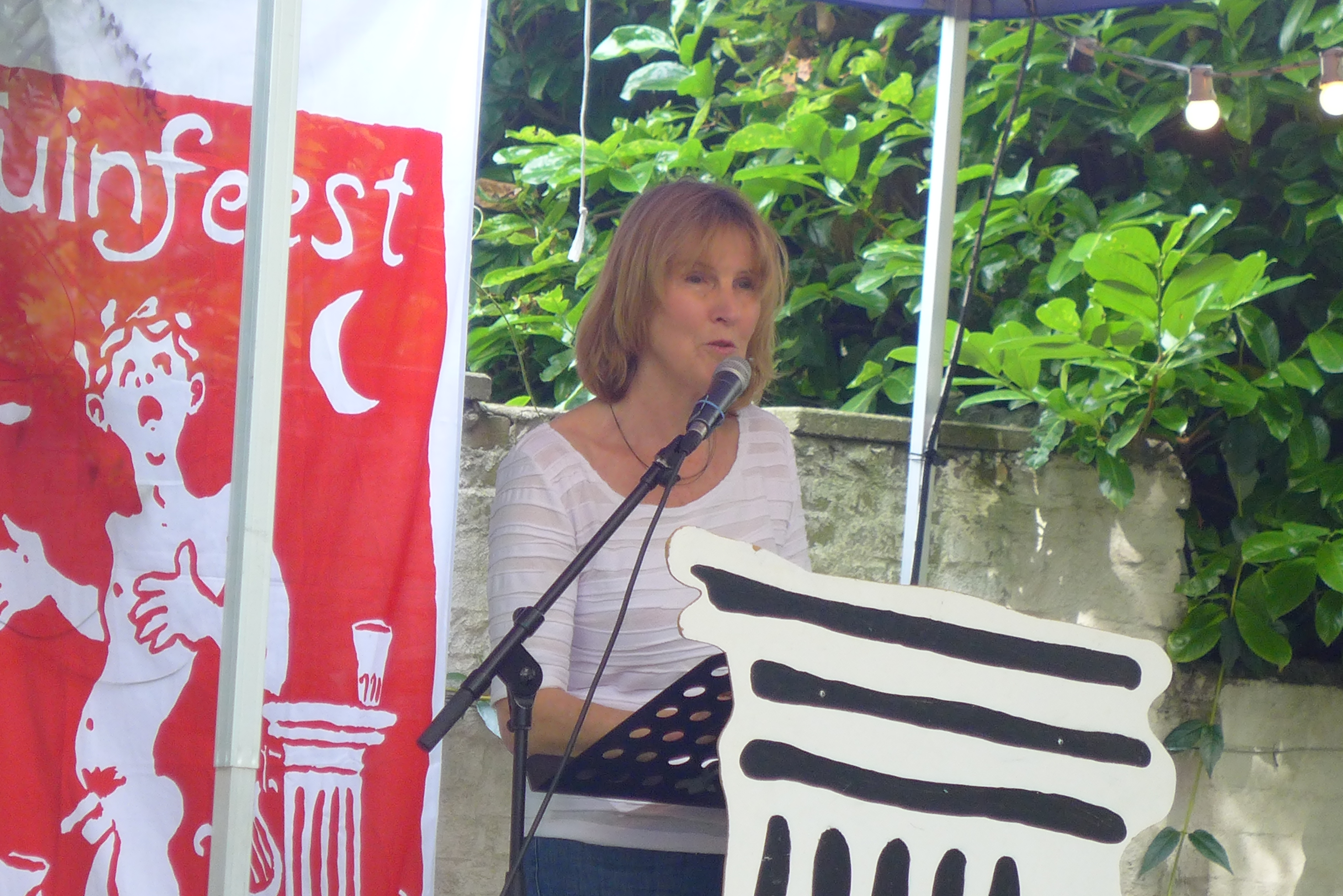
Hester Knibbe

Hester Knibbe (born 6 January 1946) is a Dutch poet.

She was born in Harderwijk. In 1982, Knibbe published her first collection of poetry Tussen gebaren en woorden (Between gestures and words). Her poetry has been included in various literary magazines and anthologies. Her 1994 collection Een hemd van vlees (A shirt of flesh) was nominated for the VSB Poetry Prize. In 2000, her 1999 book Antidood (Anti-death) was awarded the Herman Gorter Prize. In 2001, she received the Anna Blaman Prijs and, in 2009, the A. Roland Holst Prize. The 2014 collection Archaïsch de dieren (Archaic the animals) received the VSB Poetry Prize. Knibbe served as the poet laureate for the city of Rotterdam.

== Selected works ==
- Meisje in badpak (Girl in a bathing suit) (1992)
- Verstoorde grond (Disturbed ground) (2002)
- De buigzaamheid van steen (The flexibility of stone) (2005)
- Bedrieglijke dagen Treacherous days) (2008)
- Hungerpots, poetry (2015), English translation by Jacquelyn Pope
