= Onherstelbaar verbeterd =

1981 poetry book by Gerrit Komrij

Onherstelbaar verbeterd ('irreparably improved') is a slim volume of poetry by Dutch poet Gerrit Komrij. Published in 1981 by Amsterdam publisher C. J. Aarts, it contained five pastiches of canonical Dutch (expressionist) sonnets, and five original sonnets. The five pastiches are of poems by Gerrit Achterberg, J. C. Bloem, Willem Kloos, Hendrik Marsman, and Martinus Nijhoff.

The third edition, published in 1994, added another pastiche of a J. C. Bloem poem, "De Dapperstraat", now remade as "De Kalverstraat".
