= Ghayath Almadhoun =

Palestinian-Syrian-Swedish poet (born 1979)

Ghayath Almadhoun غياث المدهون
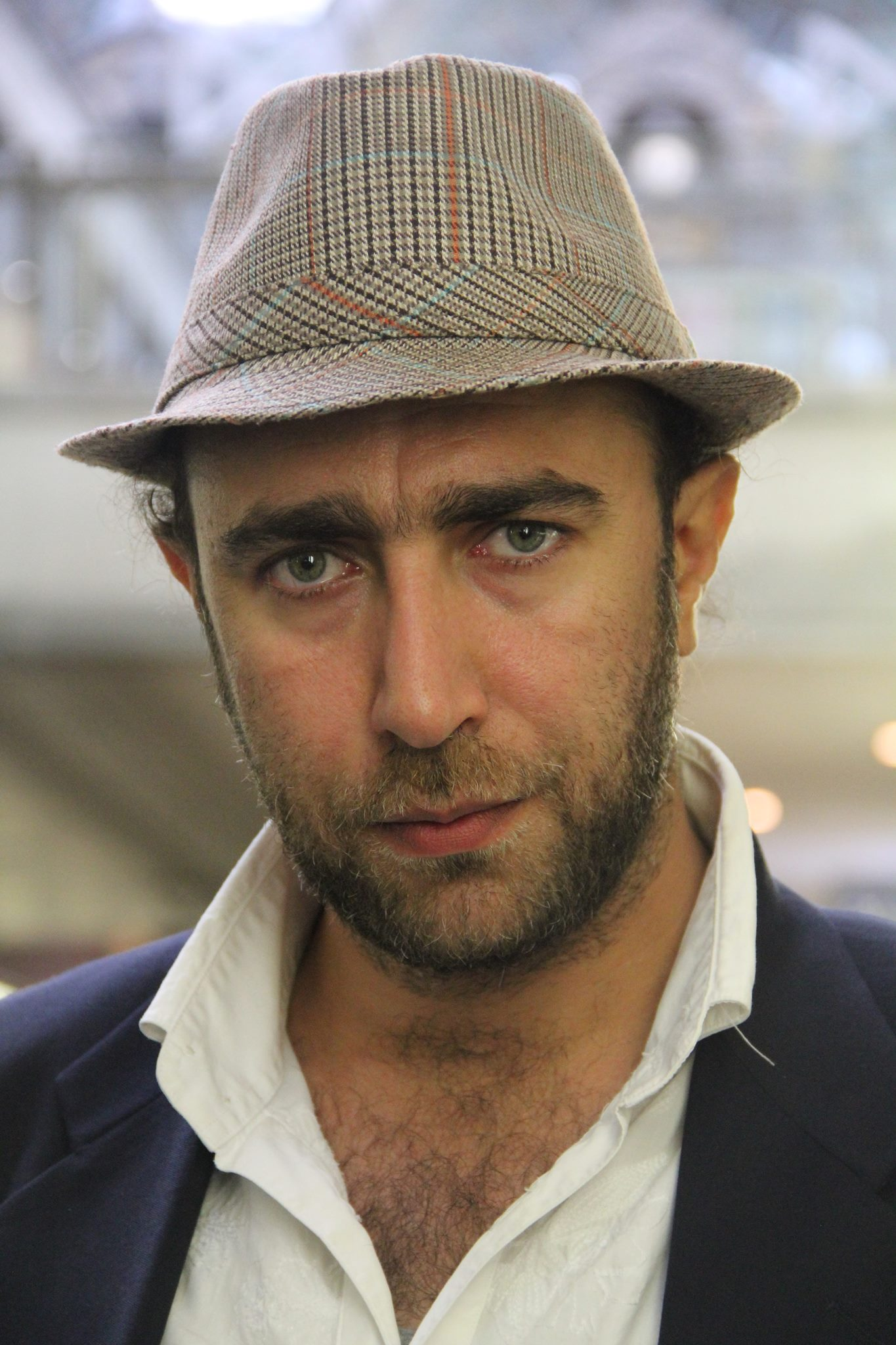
- Ghayath Almadhoun (2015)
- Born: 19 July 1979 (age 46); Damascus, Syria
- Occupation: Poet
- Website: http://www.ghayathalmadhoun.com/

Ghayath Almadhoun (Arabic: غياث المدهون; born 19 July 1979) is a Palestinian, Syrian, and Swedish poet.

== Career ==
Ghayath Almadhoun was born in Damascus, Syria as the child of Palestinian parents from Syria. He studied Arabic literature at Damascus University. In 2008 he emigrated to Sweden and became a Swedish citizen. He now lives in between Berlin & Stockholm. Almadhoun has published four collections of poetry, his first of four volumes of poetry in Arabic was published in 2004, and the latest "Adrenaline" in Milano 2017. In Sweden, he has been translated and published in two collections: Asylansökan (Ersatz, 2010), which was awarded the Klas de Vylders stipendiefond for immigrant writers. He also authored Till Damaskus (Albert Bonniers Förlag, 2014) together with the Swedish poet Marie Silkeberg. The book was at Dagens Nyheters literary critic list for Best new books and was also converted to a radio play at Swedish National Radio. He has also made several poetry films with Marie Silkeberg.

His work has been translated into Swedish, German, Greek, Slovenian, Italian, English, Dutch, French, Spanish, Czech, Croatian, Albanian, Lithuanian, Indonesian, Macedonian, Bengali, Persian, Hindi, Maltese, Hebrew, and Chinese. His poetry has been part of many artist's works, for example, the renowned artist Jenny Holzer has projected his poetry in Denmark, USA & Italy, & the legendary artist Blixa Bargeld has read loudly his poems in Norway & Greece. Lately, he has published together with the Dutch poet Anne Vegter, the poetry collection "ik hier jij daar" (Uitgeverij Jurgen Maas) Amsterdam 2017.

Adrenalin, a selection of his poems translated into English by Catherine Cobham released from Action Books, USA, on 15 November 2017. Adrenalin was on the 2018 BTBA longlist, Best Translated Book Award in the US, and at Small Press Distribution list of Poetry Bestsellers for four months - December 2017, January 2018, February 2018 & January 2019. & on the 2018 BTBA longlist of Best Translated Book Award.

"Ein Raubtier namens Mittelmeer" a selection of Ghayath Almadhoun's poems translated into German by Larissa Bender released on 9 February 2018 by (Arche Literatur Verlag AG) Zürich / Hamburg. The book ranked number 1 on the "Litprom-Bestenliste / Sommer 2018" list for the best books translated into German.

The central themes in Almadhoun’s poetry, which has been translated into numerous languages, are war and destruction, death and fight, exile and homesickness. The speaker is a witness to violence and demise and, as the only survivor, lends his voice to the dead. Almadhoun draws a temporal arc from the first chlorine gas deployments of World War I to the poison gas attacks of the Syrian regime. The protagonists of the poems are the victims of the Syrian civil war, the injured, people fleeing and seeking asylum, and those who remain in the war zone. The complex, prosaic poems are nourished by the rich imagery of Arabic poetry as well as the traditions of European poetry. »Cruelty, brutalization, and love are just as universal in Almadhoun’s texts as the language of poetry. They impressively demonstrate that the Palestinian refugee from Syria is much closer to us than many would like to believe« (Deutschlandfunk). »His poems are carried by graphic vividness, absurdity, and great stylistic sensitivity.« The »FAZ« wrote about Almadhoun: »He is the great poet of a great catastrophe.«

2019 Almadhoun received Artists in Residence at DAAD Artists-in-Berlin Program award scholarship, (Berliner Künstlerprogramm des DAAD).

== Publications ==
- قصائد سقطت سهواً, Arabic Writers Union i Damaskus 2004
- كلما اتسعت المدينة ضاقت غرفتي, Damascus as Cultural Capital for Arabic Culture 2008
- Asylansökan, Ersatz förlag 2010
- لا أستطيع الحضو, Arab Institute for Research and Publishing in Beirut and Amman 2014
- Weg van Damascus, Uitgeverij Jurgen Maas, Amsterdam 2014, Second Edition 2016, Third Edition 2017, Fourth Edition 2018
- Till Damaskus, Albert Bonniers förlag 2014 (with Marie Silkeberg)
- أدرينالين, Almutawassit, Milano 2017. Second Edition 2018
- Ik hier jij daar, Uitgeverij Jurgen Maas, Amsterdam 2017 (with Anne Vegter), Second Edition 2018
- Adrenalin, translated into English by Catherine Cobham, Action Books, USA, November 2017
- Ein Raubtiernamens Mittelmeer, translated into German by Larissa Bender, Arche Literatur Verlag, Zürich / Hamburg, February 2018. Second Edition, November 2018
- Adrenalin, poetry selection translated into Bengali by Manos Chakraborty, West Bengal, India: November 2019
- آدرنالین, poetry selection translated into Persian by Sara Rahmati, Iran: Nashre Markaz, 2019
- Adrenalina, poetry book translated into Italian by Jolanda Guardi, Milano: Edizioni Centro Studi Ilà®, 2021

== Prizes and awards ==
- 2012 Klas de Vylder Prize
- 2019 The DAAD Artists-in-Berlin Program award scholarship (Berliner Künstlerprogramm des DAAD)
- 2022 IWP Fall Residency | The International Writing Program
- 2023 The Thomas Mann House fellowship, Los Angeles, USA

== Poetry films ==
- Ödeläggelse IV Stockholm – Gaza, 2009
- The City, 2012
- Your Memory is My Freedom, 2012
- The Celebration, 2014
- SNOW, 2015
- Évian, 2020 - Best Poetry Film 2020 - ZEBRA poetry film festival. ZEBRA poetry film festival
