= Ester Naomi Perquin =

Dutch poet (born 1980)

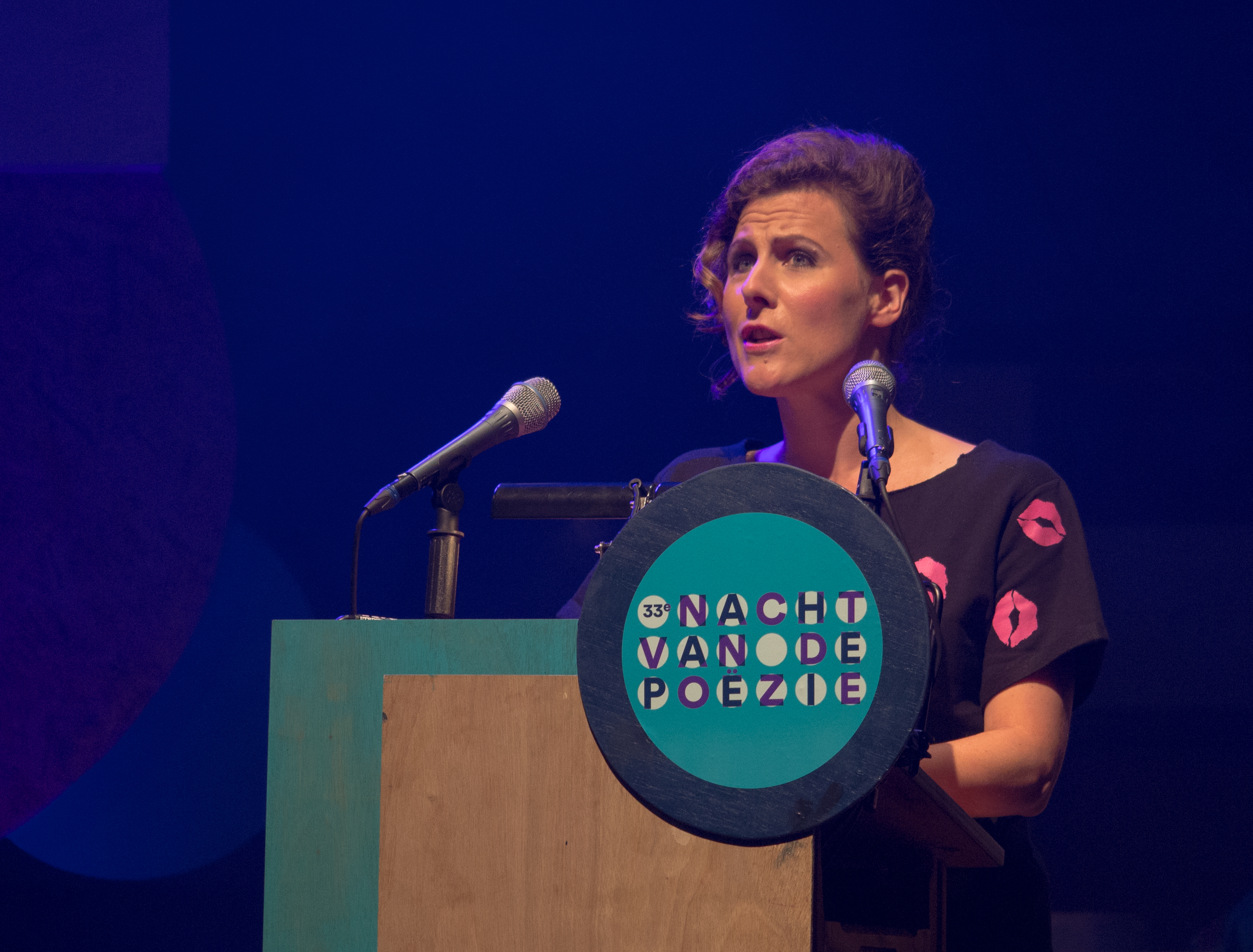
Ester Naomi Perquin at the Nacht van de Poëzie 2015

Ester Naomi Perquin (born 1980) is a Dutch poet.

== Early life and education ==
Ester Naomi Perquin was born in 1980 in Utrecht and grew up in Zierikzee.

She worked in the prison service to pay for her studies at the school of creative writing in Amsterdam.

== Career ==
Perquin was editor for the literary journal Tirade and wrote a column for the weekly De Groene Amsterdammer. She was also the city poet for Rotterdam for two years.

Her first collection of poetry Servetten Halfstok (Napkins At Half Mast) was published in 2007. This was followed by Namens de ander (On Behalf of the Other) in 2009.

Her third collection, Celinspecties (Cell Inspections), was published in 2012.

== Recognition and awards ==
- 2010: Anna Blaman Prijs
- 2010: Jo Peters Poetry Prize, for Namens de Ander
- 2011: J.C. Bloem-poëzieprijs
- 2011: Lucy B. and C.W. van der Hoogt Prize, for her first two collections
- 2012: VSB Poetry Prize, for Celinspecties (Cell Inspections)
- 2017: Elected Dutch Dichter des Vaderlands (the Dutch counterpart of Britain's Poet Laureate of the United Kingdom)

Cultural offices
Preceded by Anne Vegter	Dutch Poet Laureate "Dichter des Vaderlands"; 2017–2019	Succeeded by Tsead Bruinja
