= Hans Andreus =

Dutch poet and writer

- Born: Johan Wilhelm van der Zant; 21 February, 1926; Amsterdam, Netherlands
- Died: 9 June, 1977; Putten, Netherlands
- Occupations: Writer, poet

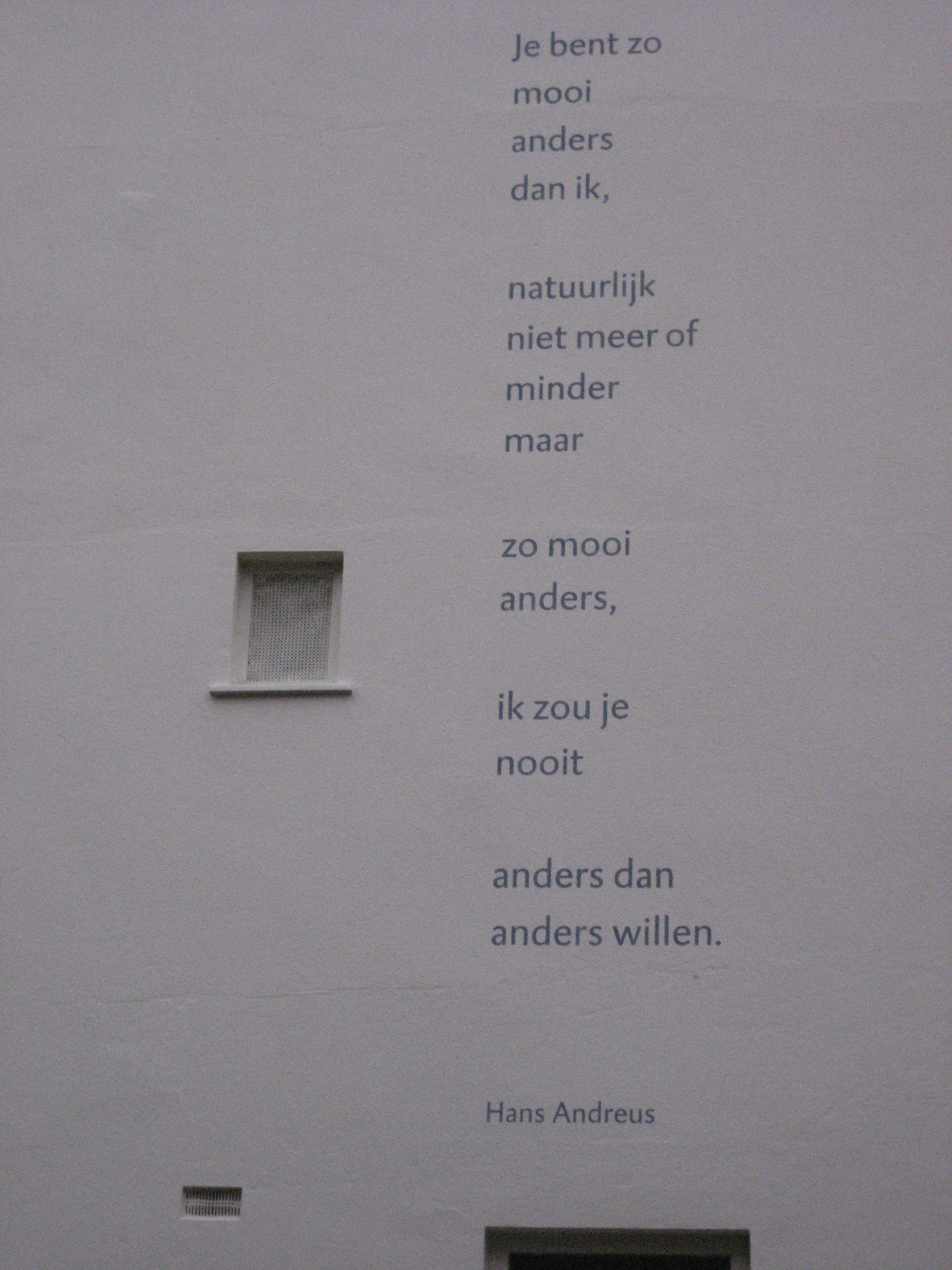
Wall poem by Andreus in The Hague

Hans Andreus (21 February 1926 – 9 June 1977) was the pseudonym of the Dutch poet and writer Johan Wilhelm van der Zant.

Van der Zant was born in Amsterdam. His parents divorced soon after his birth, his mother remarried, and the family lived in Scheveningen between 1930 and 1937 before moving back to Amsterdam. He started to write poems in 1939, and dropped out of school in 1940. In 1945, he studied for a while at the Amsterdamse Toneelschool, but also dropped out in 1947. Afterwards he worked as a corrector for the Dutch daily newspaper, De Volkskrant.

Andreus' debut work, the poetry book 'Muziek voor Kijkdieren' (tentative translation: Music for looking animals), came out in 1951. His work is seen as part of the Dutch/Belgian literary movement known as De Vijftigers, started by a group of young poets in the late 1940s and connected to the COBRA movement, which also included Lucebert and Hugo Claus.

Besides poetry, Andreus also wrote a large number of children's books, the best known series of which revolves around the character 'Meester Pompelmoes'. Andreus stories for children are full of fantastical themes, playful, and written in a lyrical, rhythmical style. In 1973 Loewes Verlag published the book 'Der große Schnurrbarttiger', a collection of his stories for children in German language with illustrations by the renown German artist Amrei Fechner. He received a number of prizes for his children's books, including a 'Zilveren Griffel' prize for his poetry book 'De Rommeltuin' and his book 'Meester Pompelmoes en de mompelpoes' won the CNPB Children's Book of the Year award in 1969 (a predecessor of the Gouden Griffel).

He also wrote a number of radio dramas, chansons, TV scripts and commercials, novels, and a novella.

Andreus died in Putten on 9 June 1977.

== Poem: Boombeschrijving (Description of a tree) ==
Bomen zijn werkelijk.
Hun bladeren praten werkelijk
met woorden veelzeggend en letterloos.

Hun toppen zingen.
Hun stammen zwijgen
hoorbaar.

Hun wortels houden
van de aarde.

Bij een boom
staande moet ik wel
ademen als een boom.

Naar een boom
ziende zie ik
hemel en aarde in elkanders
armen.

Want een boom,
een boom is een bruiloft.

— Hans Andreus. Acht gedichten. Boombeschrijving.
Maatstaf. Jaargang 6 (1958-1959), p. 704.
Translation:

Trees are real.
Their leaves speak really
in words expressive and letterless.

Their tops sing.
Their trunks are audibly
silent.

Their roots love
the earth.

Standing near a tree
I simply have to
breathe like a tree.

Looking at a tree
I see
heaven and earth in each others
arms.

For a tree,
a tree is a wedding party.
