= Anne Vegter =

Dutch poet, playwright and writer of children's literature

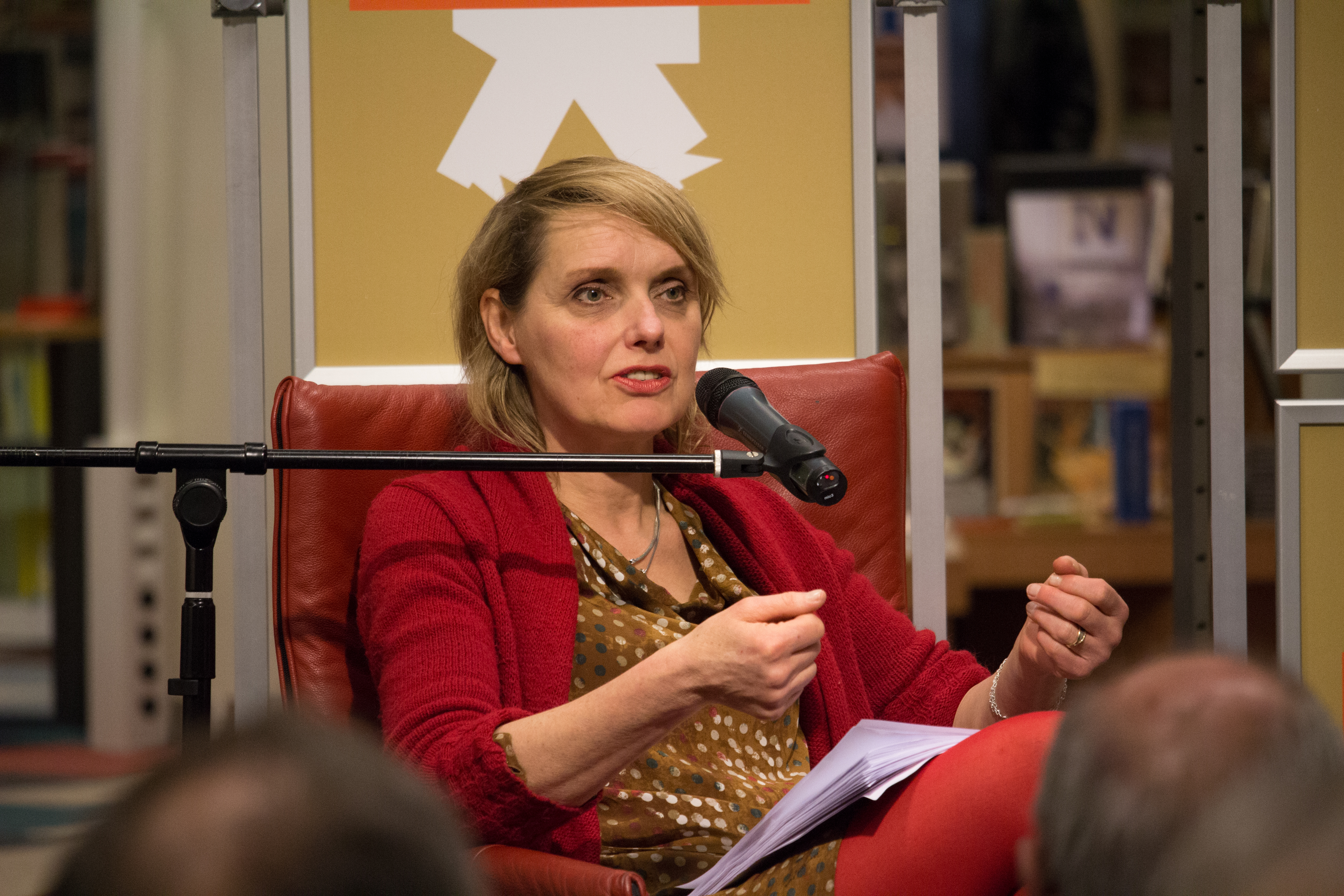
- Born: Annette Christine Vegter; 31 December 1958 (age 67); Delfzijl, Netherlands
- Occupations: Writer, poet, playwright
- Writing career
- Language: Dutch
- Genre: Children's literature

Anne Vegter (born 31 December 1958, Delfzijl) is a Dutch poet, playwright, and writer of children's literature. She is the first woman to hold the position of Dichter des Vaderlands (Dutch Poet Laureate).

== Early life ==
Vegter attended a gymnasium in Drachten and Epe. She studied art history and pedagogy in at the Academie voor Expressie door Woord en Gebaar in Utrecht in the late seventies. In 1976, she worked in a psychiatric institution. In 1977, she was diagnosed with multiple sclerosis.

== Career ==
=== Poetry and writing ===
In 1989, Vegter published her first children's book De dame en de neushoorn with illustrations by Geerten Ten Bosch. For this book they were awarded the Woutertje Pieterse Prijs in 1990. The main characters in this book were first introduced in the children's magazine St. Kitts van de Bovenwindse. In 1991, she was nominated for the AKO-Literatuurprijs for her children's book Verse bekken! which was also illustrated by Ten Bosch. Vegter continued her collaboration with Ten Bosch for her book Harries hoofdingang (1999) as well as Sprookjes van de planeet aarde (2006). The latter book was illustrated by both Geerten Ten Bosch and her sister Judith Ten Bosch. Both sisters participated in the Biennial of Illustration Bratislava in 2007 to exhibit their illustrations in this book.

In 1991, Vegter published her first poetry book Het veerde.

In 1996, Vegter made her debut as playwright with Het recht op fatsoen. In 2005, she won the Taalunie Toneelschrijfprijs together with Anna Enquist and Antoine Uitdehaag for the play Struisvogels op de Coolsingel about the German bombing of Rotterdam in 1940. The play consists of seven monologues dedicated to seven people who have died during the bombardment. The play was published as a book in 2009.

In 2004, she received the Anna Blaman Prijs for her entire oeuvre. In January 2012, she received the Awater Poëzieprijs 2011 for her poetry book Eiland berg gletsjer which she also illustrated herself.

Vegter became the poet of the city of Rotterdam in January 2021. In 2022, she won the Ida Gerhardt Poëzieprijs for her work Big data.

=== Dichter des Vaderlands ===
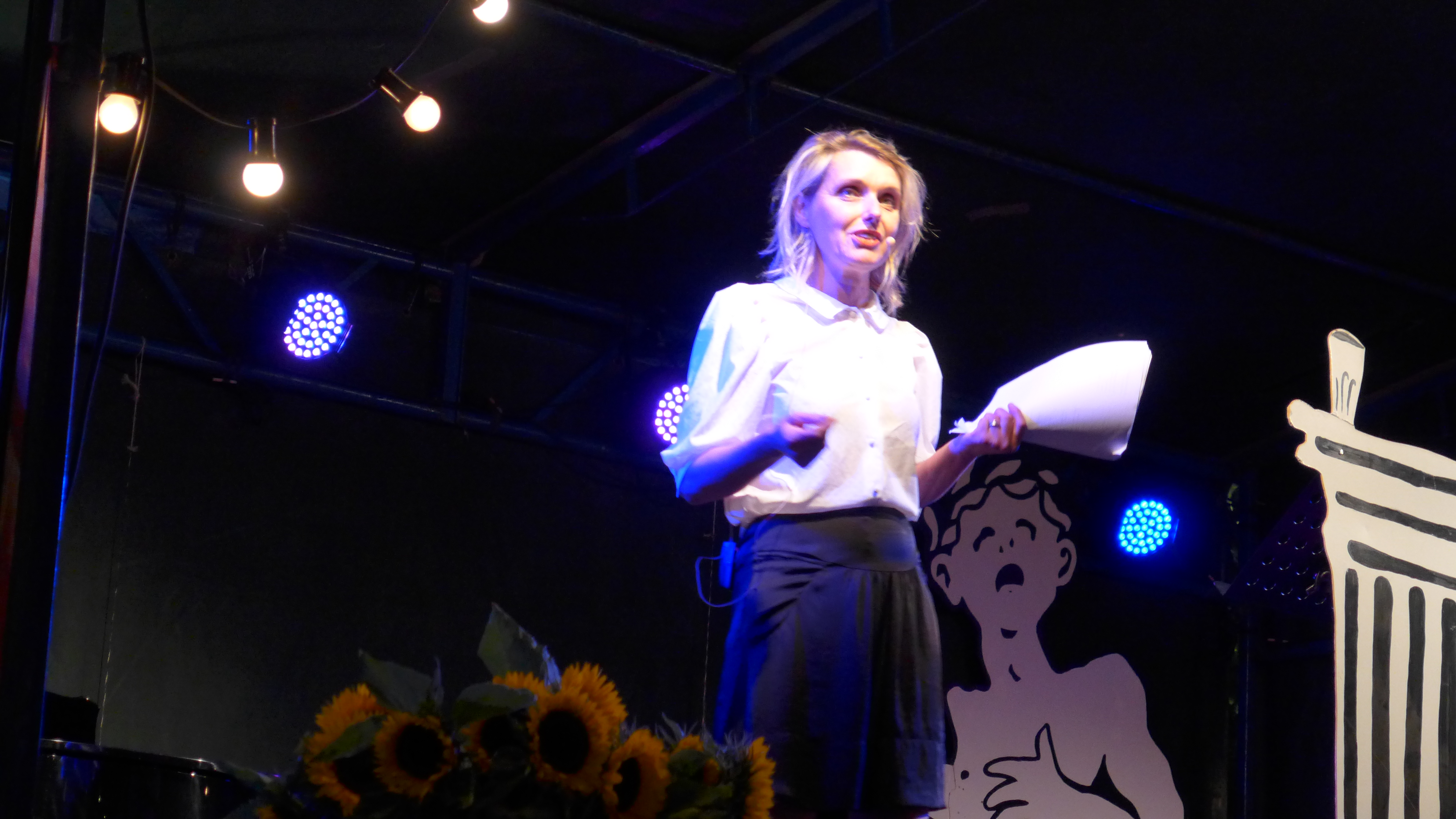
Anne Vegter (August 2013)

From 31 January 2013 (Gedichtendag 2013) until 29 January 2017 she held the position of Dichter des Vaderlands. Vegter became the first woman to hold this position. Her poems, over thirty in total, as Dichter des Vaderlands were published in Wat helpt is een wonder (2017). These poems discuss various topics of national importance including the inauguration of Willem-Alexander in 2013, the downing of Malaysia Airlines Flight 17 in 2014 and the death of Johan Cruyff in 2016.

Some of these poems are on display in public spaces, such as De middelen (2015) in footpath near Leeuwarden railway station and We weten nog niet hoe (2016) which spans the Waalkade (a quay of 600 meters) in Nijmegen. Vegter also wrote the poem De Koning en ik (2014) which is on display next to a bust of Willem-Alexander of the Netherlands made by sculptor Natasja Bennink.

=== Inspiration ===
In 2016, she mentioned The Little Prince by Antoine de Saint-Exupéry and Turks Fruit by Jan Wolkers as sources of inspiration. She also expressed admiration for the work of Armando.

== Publications ==
- De dame en de neushoorn (1989)
- Verse bekken! (1990)
- Het veerde (1991)
- Ongekuiste versies (1994)
- Het recht op fatsoen (1996)
- Harries hoofdingang (1999)
- Hondenvoer voor sociologen (1999)
- Lees je beter! (2001)
- Aandelen en obligaties (2002)
- Sprookjes van de planeet aarde (2006)
- Spamfighter (2007)
- Eiland berg gletsjer (2011)
- Wat helpt is een wonder (2017)
- Ik hier jij daar (2017, with Ghayath Almadhoun)
- Big data (2019)

Cultural offices
Preceded by Ramsey Nasr	Dutch Poet Laureate "Dichter des Vaderlands"; 2013–2017	Succeeded by Ester Naomi Perquin
