= Gerrit Komrij =

Dutch writer (1944–2012)

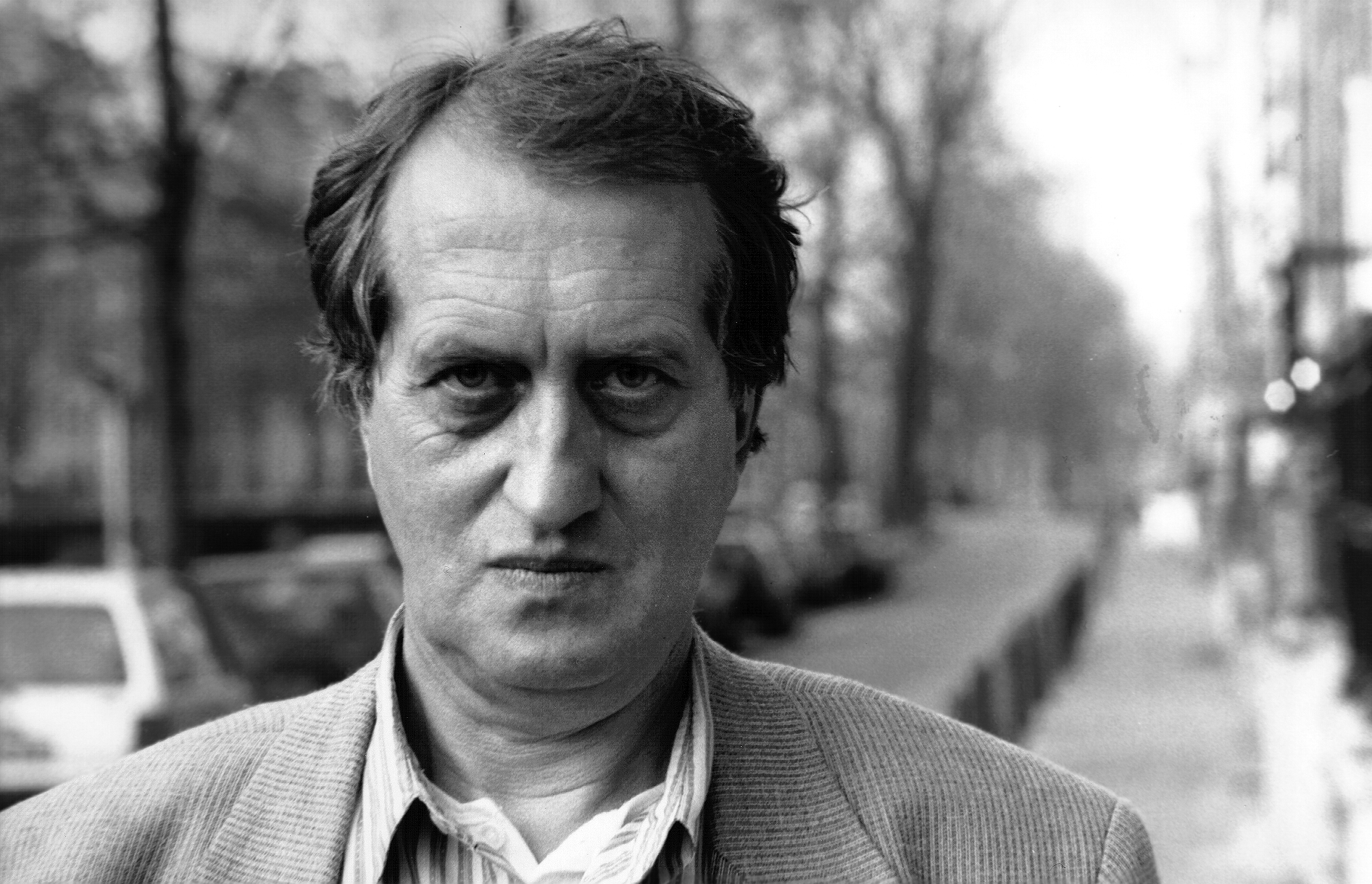
- Gerrit Komrij (1994)
- Born: Gerrit Jan Komrij; 30 March 1944; Winterswijk, Netherlands
- Died: 5 July 2012 (aged 68); Amsterdam, Netherlands
- Occupations: Poet, novelist, translator, literary critic, playwright
- Partner: Charles Hofman
- Writing career
- Period: 1968-2012
- Notable awards: P. C. Hooft Award (1993)
- Website: www.komrij.blogspot.com

Gerrit Jan Komrij (30 March 1944 – 5 July 2012) was a Dutch poet, novelist, translator, critic, polemic journalist and playwright. He rose to prominence in the early 1970s, writing poetry that sharply contrasted with the free-form poetry of his contemporaries. He acquired a reputation for his prose in the late 1970s, writing acerbic essays and columns often critical of writers, television programs, and politicians. As a literary critic and especially as an anthologist he had a formative influence on Dutch literature: his 1979 anthology of Dutch poetry of the 19th and 20th centuries, reformed the canon, and was followed by anthologies of Dutch poetry of the 17th and 18th centuries, of Afrikaans poetry, and of children's poetry. Those anthologies and a steady stream of prose and poetry publications solidified his reputation as one of the country's leading writers and critics; he was awarded the highest literary awards including the P. C. Hooft Award (1993), and from 2000 to 2004, he was the Dutch Dichter des Vaderlands (Poet Laureate). Komrij died in 2012 at age 68.

== Biography ==
Gerrit Jan Komrij was born on 30 March 1944 in the eastern Dutch town of Winterswijk, Gelderland. He soon moved to Amsterdam and began a literary career. In 1968 his first volume of poetry was published, Maagdenburgse halve bollen en andere gedichten, and in 1969 he became editor of the Bert Bakker-founded literary magazine Maatstaf.

In the 1970s and 1980s, Komrij and his partner Charles Hofman befriended a number of Dutch authors including Boudewijn Büch, with whom he maintained a lengthy correspondence. In the early 1980s Komrij and Hofman moved to Portugal, not long after his play Het Chemisch Huwelijk premiered in Amsterdam; he lived in Portugal ever since. Komrij gave the 2008 Mosse Lecture, titled Waarom zijn Nederlanders zo dol op homoseksuelen? (Why are the Dutch so fond of homosexuals?).

His death, in 2012, was met with widespread praise for his work. Poet laureate Ramsey Nasr, who cited Komrij as one of inspirations, wrote a poem for him, and Queen Beatrix sent her condolences via telegram to Charles Hofman, saying that the Netherlands had lost a great poet.

== Lyrics ==
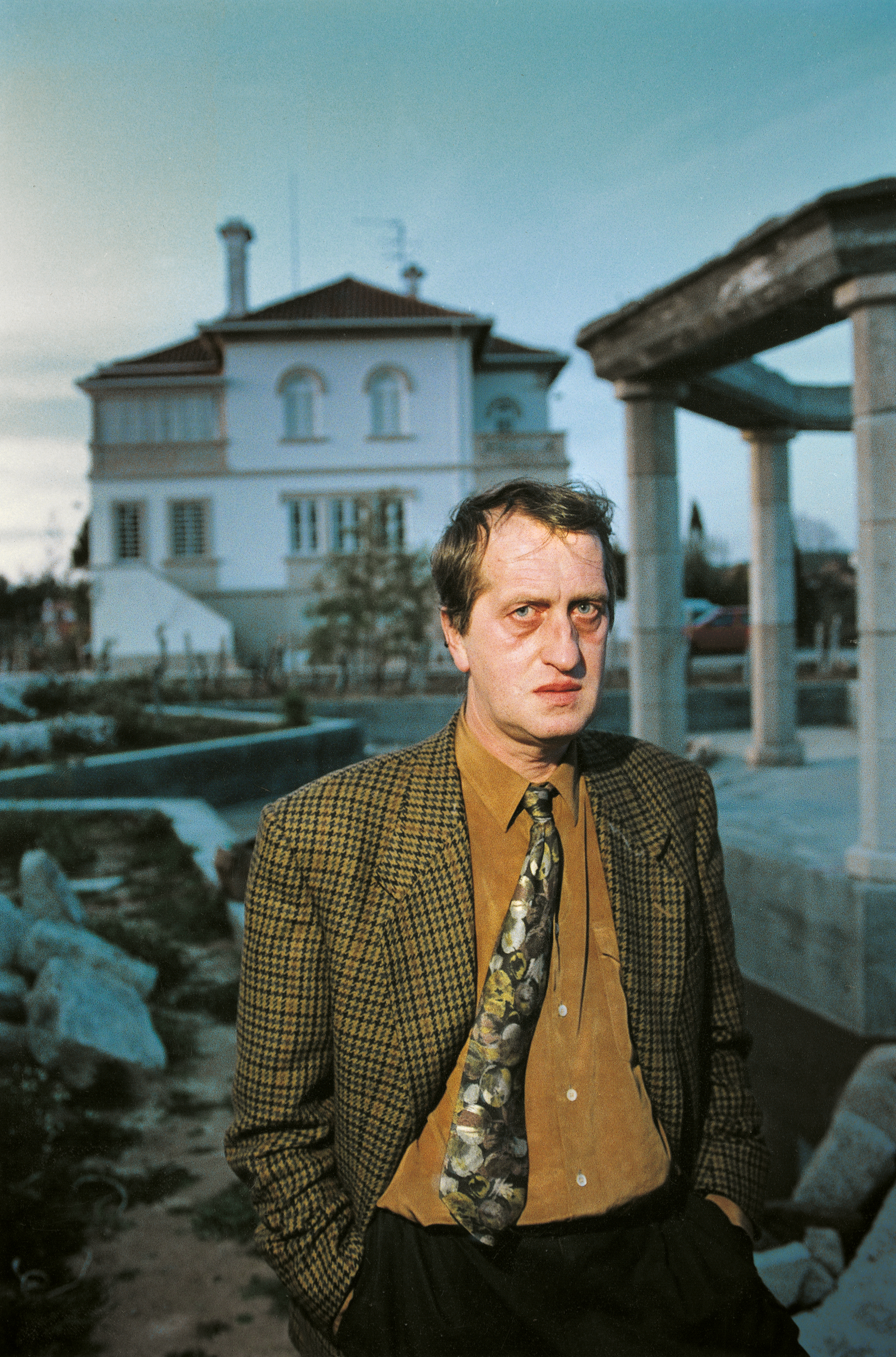
Komrij in 2007

Komrij wrote librettos to two operas: Symposium by Peter Schat (1994), and Melodias Estranhas by Antonio Chagas Rosa (2000).

He supplied lyrics to two collaborative ventures with the Dutch vocal ensemble Camerata Trajectina. The first was in reconstructing song texts to Dutch songs by Jacob Obrecht (2005). The second was in lyrics for the chamber choral cycle De Seven Zonden van Jeroen Bosch (The Seven Sins of Hieronymus Bosch) set to largely anonymous 16th Century tunes (2009). The theme of the Seven Sins follows the depiction in The Seven Deadly Sins and the Four Last Things a painting Hieronymus Bosch completed in 1485.

== Prose ==
Besides being a critic of poetry and culture in general, Komrij wrote several semi-autobiographical works, including Verwoest Arcadië ('Arcadia Demolished', 1980) and Demonen ('Demons', 2003). He also authored several novels, Over de bergen ('Over the Mountains'), Dubbelster ('Double Star') and De klopgeest ('Poltergeist').

== Books about books, anthologies ==
Komrij was a collector of rare and absurd books (a hobby he shared with Boudewijn Büch), and has written extensively about them. Old homosexual literature, quaint 18th and 19th century poets, and ancient literature about farting are some of his more remarkable subjects. His articles and essays were collected in books such as like Verzonken boeken ('Sunk Books'), Averechts ('The Other Way') and Kakafonie ('Cacaphonia')--the latter subtitled An Encyclopedia of Shit. In 1979 Komrij published a new standard Dutch poetry anthology, De Nederlandse poëzie van de 19de en 20ste eeuw in 1000 en enige gedichten ("Dutch poetry of the 19th and 20th century in 1000 and some poems'), which quickly became the yardstick by which poets were measured. It was soon followed by a volume of 17th and 18th century poetry, an anthology of South African poets, and an anthology of medieval poems. He also edited various other anthologies, one about mothers and one selecting poetry by Jacob Israël de Haan.

Komrij has translated from many different languages, including all of Shakespeare's plays.

== Awards ==
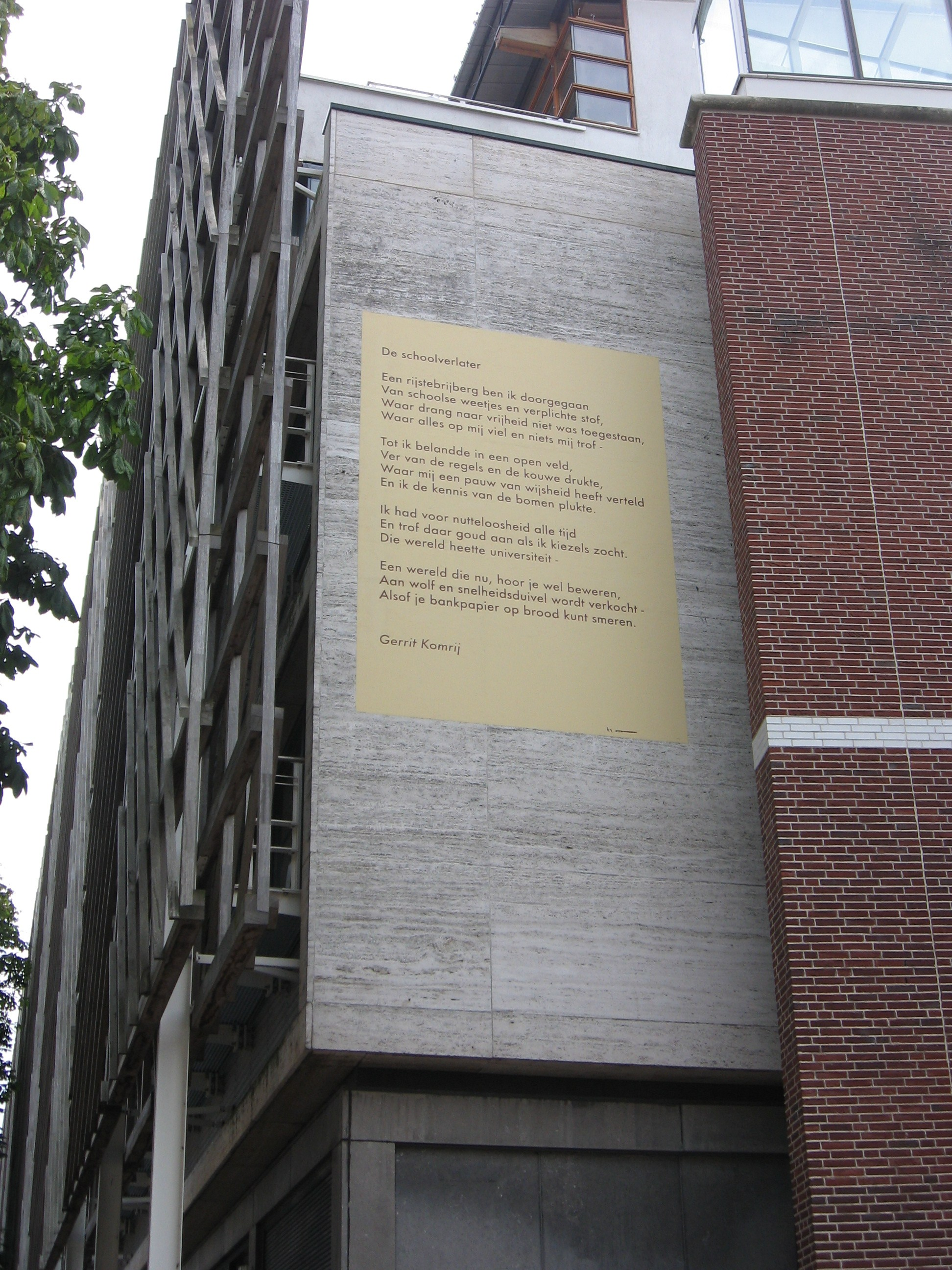
Komrij's "Schoolverlater" displayed in Leiden.

His prose was recognized in 1979, when he was awarded the Busken Huet award. In 1993, Komrij received the P.C. Hooft Award, the chief literary accolade in the Dutch language area, for his prose. For his poetry, he won the poetry prize of the city of Amsterdam in 1970, for Alle vlees is als gras, and the Herman Gorter prize in 1982, for De os op de klokketoren.

== Select bibliography ==
=== Autobiography ===
- Verwoest Arcadië. [Arcadia Demolished, slightly fictional autobiography.] Privé-Domein 59. Amsterdam: Arbeiderspers, 1980. ISBN 90-295-2694-7.
- Intimiteiten. [Intimacies; autobiographical essays.] Amsterdam: Arbeiderspers, 1993. ISBN 978-90-295-2684-5.
- Demonen. [Demons; "autobiographical stories."] Amsterdam: De Bezige Bij, 2003. ISBN 978-90-234-1159-8.
- Eendagsvliegen. [Mayflies; diary entries 1965-2005.] Amsterdam: De Bezige Bij, 2005. ISBN 978-90-234-1768-2.

=== Prose fiction ===
- Een zakenlunch in Sintra en andere Portuguese verhalen. [A Business Lunch in Sintra and other Portuguese Stories; 28 short stories.] Amsterdam: Arbeiderspers, 1995. ISBN 90-295-2700-5.
- De klopgeest. [The Poltergeist; novel.] Amsterdam: De Bezige Bij, 2001. ISBN 90-234-6244-0.

=== Prose criticism ===
- Lood en hagel. [Lead and Hail; anthology of 'ad hominem' essays.] Amsterdam: Arbeiderspers, 1998. ISBN 978-90-295-2452-0.
- Vreemd pakhuis. [Strange Warehouse; collection of essays on authors and literature.] Amsterdam: De Bezige Bij, 2001. ISBN 978-90-234-7037-3.

=== Poetry ===
- Twee werelden. [Two Worlds; cycle of 8 sonnets on European unification in Dutch, Danish, German, English, French, Greek, Italian, Portuguese, Spanish.] Amsterdam: Arbeiderspers, 1987. ISBN 90-295-2720-X.
- Rook zonder vuur. [Smoke Without Fire; 20 sonnets.] The Hague: Stupers Van der Heijden, 1998. ISBN 90-75618-09-3.
- 52 Sonnetten bij het Verglijden van de Eeuw. [52 Sonnets on the Passing of the Century.] Amsterdam: Bert Bakker, 2000. ISBN 90-351-2145-7.
- Luchtspiegelingen: Gedichten, voornamelijk elegisch. [Mirages: Poems, mainly Elegiac; 47 poems.] Amsterdam: De Bezige Bij, 2001. ISBN 978-90-234-4819-8.
- Komrij's patentwekker. [Komrij's Patented Alarm Clock; 12 poems detailing the rectal insertion of a burning candle to function as an alarm clock.] Illustrations by Dick Matena. Originally published 1974. Amsterdam: De Bezige Bij, 2007. ISBN 978-90-234-2262-4.
- Onherstelbaar verbeterd. ["Irreparably improved"; 5 pastiches of canonical Dutch sonnets, and 5 original sonnets by Komrij.] C. J. Aarts, 1981.
- Alle gedichten. [All Poems; collected poetry.] 4th, enlarged edition, Amsterdam: De Bezige Bij, 2018. ISBN 978-94-031-0830-8.

=== Encyclopedia ===
- Komrij's Kakafonie: Encyclopedie van de stront. [Komrij's Cacaphonia: An Encyclopedia of Shit.] Amsterdam: De Bezige Bij, 2006. ISBN 90-234-1907-3.

=== Anthologies ===
- De Afrikaanse poëzie in 1000 en enige gedichten. [Afrikaans Poetry in 1001 Poems; anthology of South-African poetry.] Amsterdam: Bert Bakker, 1999. ISBN 978-90-351-2041-9.
- De Afrikaanse poëzie, 10 gedichten en een lexicon. [Afrikaans Poetry, 10 Poems and a Lexicon; 10 South-African poems with explications and glossary.] Amsterdam: Bert Bakker, 1999. ISBN 978-90-351-2094-5.

Cultural offices
Preceded by New title	Dutch Poet Laureate "Dichter des Vaderlands"; 2000–2004	Succeeded by Simon Vinkenoog a.i.
