= Komrij's patentwekker =

Poetry book by Gerrit Komrij

Komrij's Patentwekker (Komrij's patented alarm clock)
- Author: Gerrit Komrij
- Language: Dutch
- Publisher: De Bezige Bij
- Publication date: 2007
- Publication place: Netherlands
- Media type: Print
- Pages: 31
- ISBN: 978-90-234-2262-4
- OCLC: 150290338

Komrij's Patentwekker (Komrij's patented alarm clock) is a book of humorous poetry by Dutch author Gerrit Komrij, first published in 1974. The book contains four poems which outline a fictional invention—an alarm clock that consists of a burning candle inserted in the sleeper's anus, containing markings for each hour to be spent sleeping. The deeper the candle is inserted, the earlier the sleeper rises; the inventor acquires a patent on his idea. The four poems are formalist, like the rest of Komrij's poetry. They have three quatrains each, rhyming a b a b in pentametric lines.

The poems are inspired by a suggestion in Non Olet by Collofino (ps. of Josef Feinhals, 1867–1947). They were first published (apparently without the author's permission) in a series called Amsterdamse Cahiers by Amsterdam printer and publisher C.J. Aarts, supposedly on the occasion of the 1974 edition of Poetry International, an annual Dutch poetry festival. He later republished the poems (with the author's permission) in 1982. They were included in Komrij's anthology Alle gedichten tot gisteren ("All the poems until yesterday"). In 2007, the poems were again republished separately, with 12 black and white illustrations by Dick Matena.

In 1996, 22 years after its first publication, Komrij's reading of it in Tilburg in 1996 at the annual Night of the Book festival was particularly well received. The poem fits in a tradition of scatological and rectal poems, many of which were collected by Komrij in his Komrij's Cacaphonia: An Encyclopedia of Shit (2006). The poem is often associated with Komrij, and it is one of the most popular "light" Dutch poems.
