= Anna Enquist =

Dutch writer (born 1945)

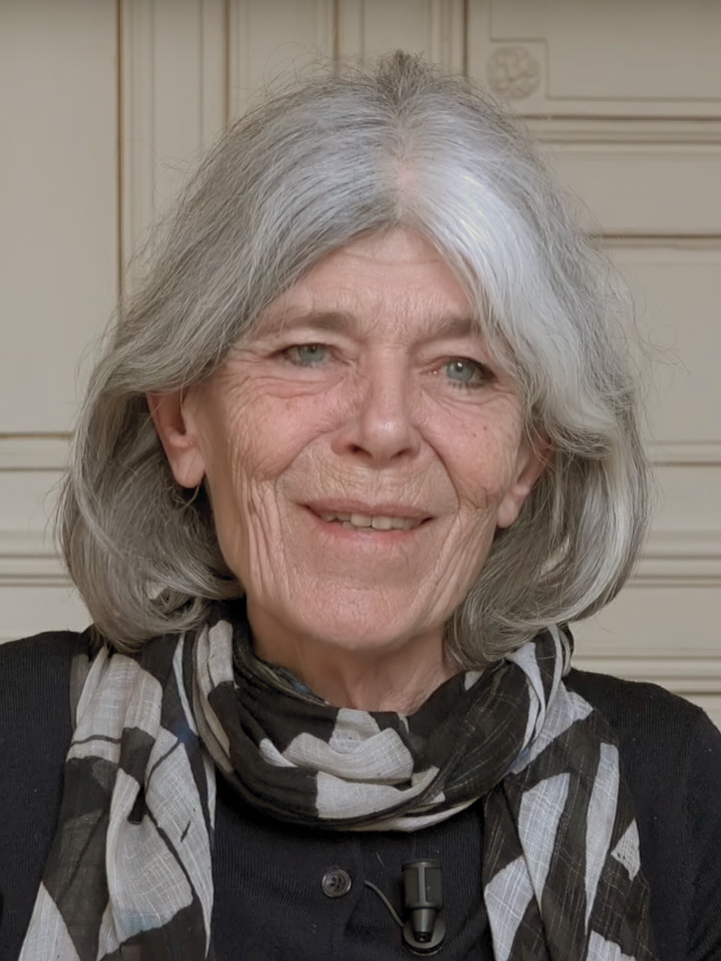
- Anna Enquist (2016)
- Born: Christa Widlund-Broer; 19 July 1945 (age 80); Amsterdam, Netherlands
- Occupations: Poet and writer

Anna Enquist (born 19 July 1945) is the pen name of one of the more popular authors in the Netherlands, Christa Widlund-Broer. She is known for both her poetry and her novels.

== Biography ==
Born in Amsterdam, Enquist studied piano at the music academy in The Hague and psychology at Leiden University. Her first poems appeared in the journal Maatstaf in 1988, while her first collection Soldatenliederen (Soldiers' Songs) was published in 1991, while she was still working as a psychoanalyst. In 1992, she received the C. Buddingh'-prijs for her debut poetry collection. Thereafter she devoted most of her time to literature. On the poetry front, she published six more collections: Jachtscènes (Hunting Scenes; 1992), Een nieuw afscheid (A New Goodbye; 1994), De tweede helft (The Second Half; 2000), Hier was vuur (Here Was Fire; 2002), De tussentijd (The Interval; 2004) and Nieuws van nergens (News from Nowhere; 2010). They have all been published in one volume as Gedichten 1991-2012.

Enquist's first prose works, Het meesterstuk (The Masterpiece, 1995) and Het geheim (The Secret, 1997), are psychological novels in which classical music plays an important part. In 2002, she reached a wide readership with De ijsdragers (The Ice Carriers) which was distributed as a free gift during the Dutch Book Week in 2002. Her acclaimed historical novel De thuiskomst (The Homecoming, 2005) is centred on Elizabeth Batts, the wife of the British explorer James Cook. In 2008, she published Contrapunt (Counterpoint) about a pianist studying Bach's Goldberg Variations and remembering her deceased daughter. This moving novel is based on the author's tragic experience of losing her own 27-year-old daughter Margit in a biking accident in Amsterdam in 2001.

Psychological and relationship issues, the loss of a child or children, painful memories, the challenges of ageing as well as her love of classical music are themes not only of Counterpoint, but also of her 2014 novel Kwartet (Quartet).

== Awards ==
In 2005, Enquist received the Taalunie Toneelschrijfprijs together with Antoine Uitdehaag and Anne Vegter for their play Struisvogels op de Coolsingel.
