= Marie Silkeberg =

Swedish writer (born 1961)

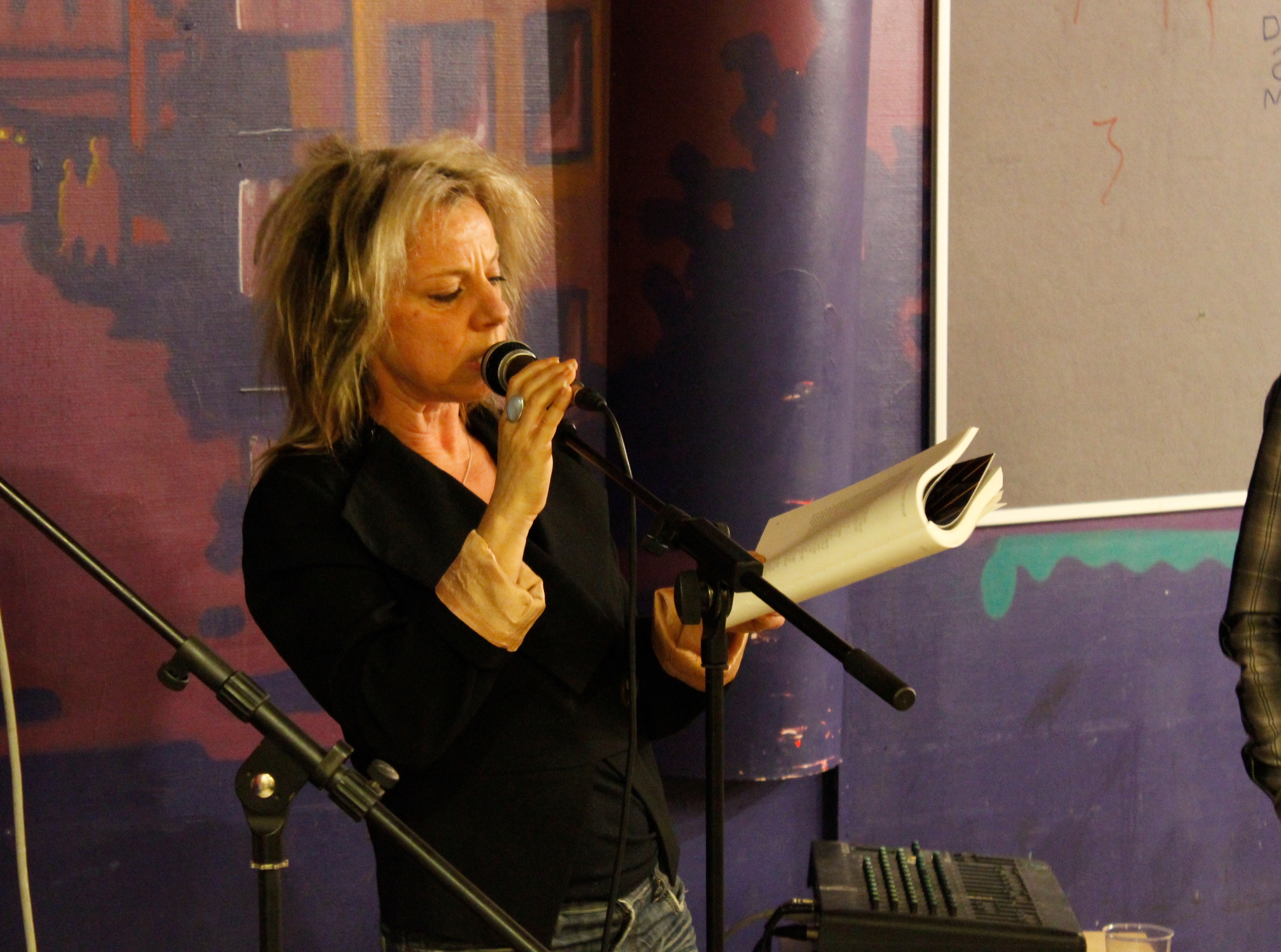
Marie Silkeberg reads from Material, 2011

Marie Silkeberg (born June 3, 1961, in Denmark) is a Swedish writer and translator.

== Writing and teaching ==
Silkeberg is primarily a poet and has been publishing books since 1990. She has also written drama and essays, and has translated, among others, Marguerite Duras, the Danish poets Inger Christensen, Pia Tafdrup, and Mette Moestrup, and the American poets Susan Howe, Rosmarie Waldrop, Claudia Rankine (together with Jenny Tunedal), Alice Notley and Anne Boyer. Most of her books have been published by the esteemed Swedish publishing house Albert Bonniers Förlag. She has been teaching as an adjunct professor and professor in Creative Writing at Valand Academy at The University of Gothenburg from 2004 to 2014 and HCA Academy Visiting professor at the Department for Study of Culture, University of Southern Denmark 2015–2018.

Silkeberg's most recent books respond to some of the most wrenching events of recent decades, including globalization and the war in Syria. She collaborated with Ghayath Almadhoun on the 2014 book Till Damaskus. The book was at Dagens Nyheters literary critic list for Best new books and was also converted to a radio play at Swedish National Radio. Together with Ghayath Almadhoun she has made several poetry films.

Her 2021 book Revolution House was reviewed in Dagens Nyheter, Sweden's newspaper of record, as a book about a relationship full of "passion with political blockages." Another review of the book in Aftonbladet calls Silkeberg "wonderfully daring and forward-thinking."

== Awards and fellowships ==
In 2004, Silkeberg was awarded the Swedish Radio Poetry Prize for Sockenplan, säger hon. She received Karl Vennberg's Poetry prize from the Nine Society in 2007. She was an artist in residence at Circolo Scandinavo, the Nordic artists' residence program in Rome. In 2015 she was a resident in the University of Iowa's International Writing Program.

In 2018, she held a fellowship at MacDowell. Her 2021 book Revolution House was nominated for the Swedish Radio Poetry Prize.

Silkeberg has received three writing grants from the Swedish Academy. The first was in 2002, the Ilona Kohrtz grant. That was followed by the Kalleberger grant in 2007. And in 2015, she was awarded the Anna Sjöstedts grant from the Swedish Academy. And the Signe Ekblad-Elds Prize in 2017.

Her poems in Kelsi Vanada's translation won The American-Scandinavian Foundation's Nadia Christensen Translation Prize in 2018 and won the literary magazine Asymptote's translation competition in 2016.

== Publication in translation ==
Some of Silkeberg's poems appear in translation into German, Arabic, Slovenian, and English at LyrikLine. An excerpt of her book Atlantis, translated into English by Emma Warg, was featured in the Swedish Translation Issue of the literary journal Interim, edited by Johannes Göransson. Damascus, Atlantis: Selected Poems, translated into English by Kelsi Vanada, published in 2021 by Terra Nova Press, an imprint of MIT Press, was longlisted for the 2022 PEN America Poetry in Translation Award.

== Works ==
- 1990 – Komma och gå
- 1994 – Akustisk Alhambra
- 1997 – Imorgon, och imorgon
- 2003 – Sockenplan, säger hon
- 2005 – Avståndsmätning (essäer)
- 2006 – 23:23
- 2009 – Ödeläggelse
- 2010 – Material
- 2014 – Till Damaskus (with Ghayath Almadhoun)
- 2017 – Atlantis
- 2021 – Revolution House
- 2021 – Damascus, Atlantis: Selected Poems (English translation)
