= Simon Vinkenoog =

Dutch writer and poet

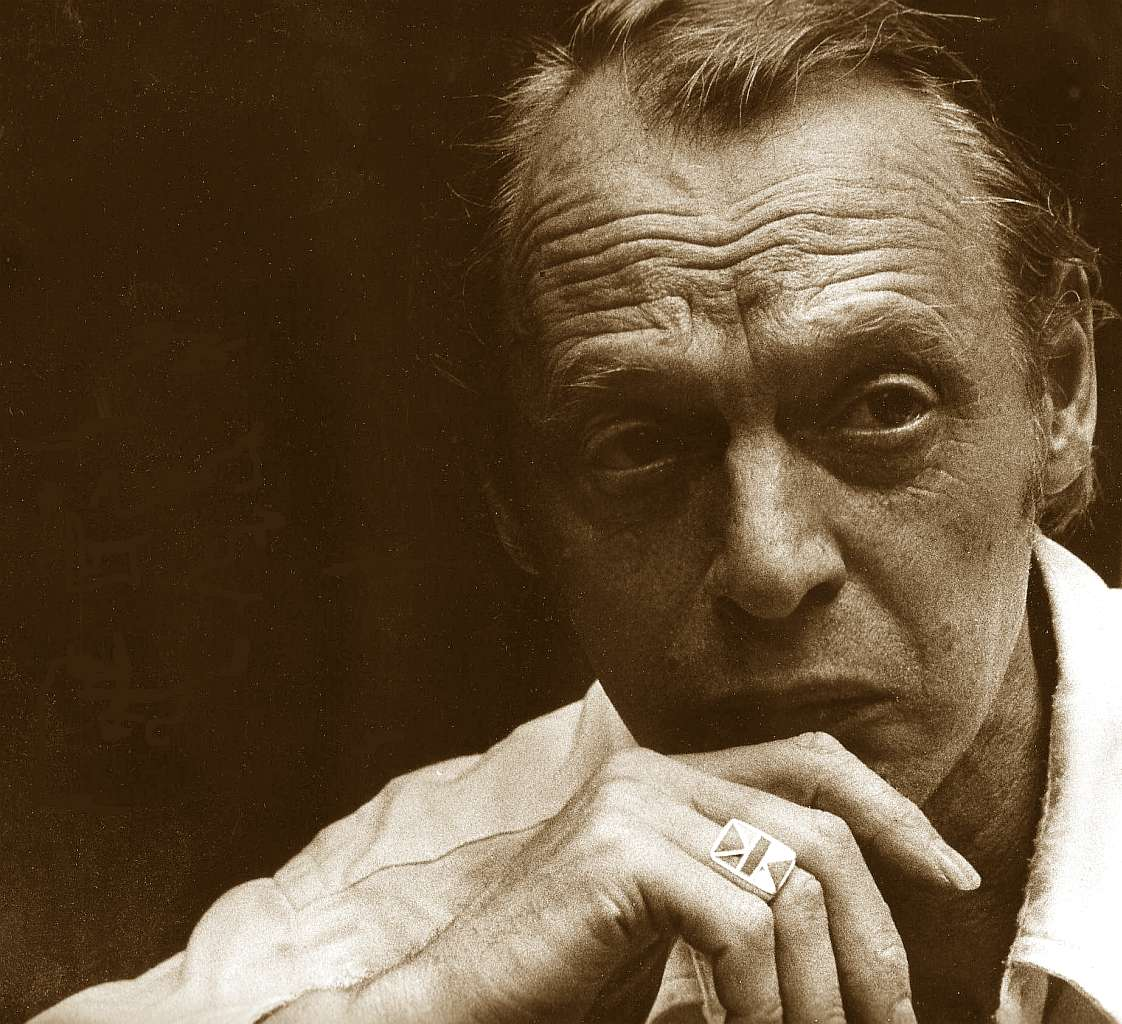
- Born: 18 July 1928
- Died: 12 July 2009 (aged 80)
- Occupations: Writer, poet
- Writing career
- Period: 1950–2001
- Website: www.simonvinkenoog.nl

Simon Vinkenoog (18 July 1928 – 12 July 2009) was a Dutch poet, spoken word poet and writer. He was the editor of the anthology Atonaal (Atonal), which launched the Dutch "Fifties Movement".

In 2004 he was chosen as Dichter des Vaderlands, or "Poet Laureate", for the Netherlands. On 11 July 2009 Vinkenoog was admitted to an Amsterdam hospital after suffering a seizure. He died the following day.

== Bibliography ==
- 1950 – Wondkoorts – poems
- 1951 – Atonaal – anthology (editor)
- 1954 – Zo lang te water, een alibi – novel
- 1962 – Hoogseizoen – novel
- 1965 – Liefde – novel
- 1968 – How to Enjoy Reality – pamphlet, included in International Times. With Jean-Paul Vroom
- 1976 – Mij best – novel
- 1978 – Het huiswerk van de dichter – poems
- 1979 – (1972-1978) Bestaan en begaan
- 1980 – Jack Kerouac in Amsterdam
- 1980 – Moeder Gras
- 1981 – Poolshoogte/Approximations
- 1982 – Voeten in de aarde en bergen verzetten – poems
- 1986 – Stadsnatuur, dagboeknotities
- 1986 – Coito ergo Sum: samenspraak der eenwording
- 1986 – O boze droom
- 1987 – Leven en dood van Marcel Polak – biography
- 1987 – Heren zeventien, proeve van waarneming
- 1988 – Op het eerste gehoor – poems
- 1993 – Louter genieten – poems
- 1996 – Het hoogste woord: De stem van Simon Vinkenoog
- 1998 – Vreugdevuur – poems
- 1998 – Herem 'n tijd – collected articles
- 2000 – De ware Adam – poems
- 2001 – Me and my peepee (translation of poems by Allen Ginsberg)

== See also ==
- International Poetry Incarnation

Cultural offices
Preceded by Gerrit Komrij	Dutch Poet Laureate "Dichter des Vaderlands"; 2004–2005	Succeeded by Driek van Wissen
