= De Vijftigers =

De Vijftigers ("Those of the fifties") were a loosely connected group of experimental Dutch and Belgian writers, which was started in the late 1940s and were also connected to the Cobra movement. The group included Hans Andreus, Lucebert, Simon Vinkenoog, Armando, Hugo Claus, and Jan Hanlo, among others.

== Background ==
De Vijftigers opposed the art views of their predecessors. There is a lyric that we abolish, as they put it. These are the poets Lucebert, Hugo Claus and Gerrit Kouwenaar, Remco Campert and Jan Elburg. They had previously become involved with a group of young Danish, Belgian and Dutch artists, who called themselves Cobra, Copenhagen, Brussels, Amsterdam. According to these Cobra artists-among them Karel Appel, Corneille and Constant – real vital art could only be made by truly free people. Everything that stood in the way of that freedom had to be fought. Aesthetic conventions were things that hindered freedom and therefore art had to be able to arise directly from its original sources: spontaneity and immediacy were important.

Examples of immediate expression, unhindered by all sorts of aesthetic layers above it, they found especially in children's drawings and in African folk art. Their atonal poetry can be seen as a counter-reaction to the much more businesslike Poésie parlante of the 1930s.
