= Ramsey Nasr =

Dutch writer, actor and poet

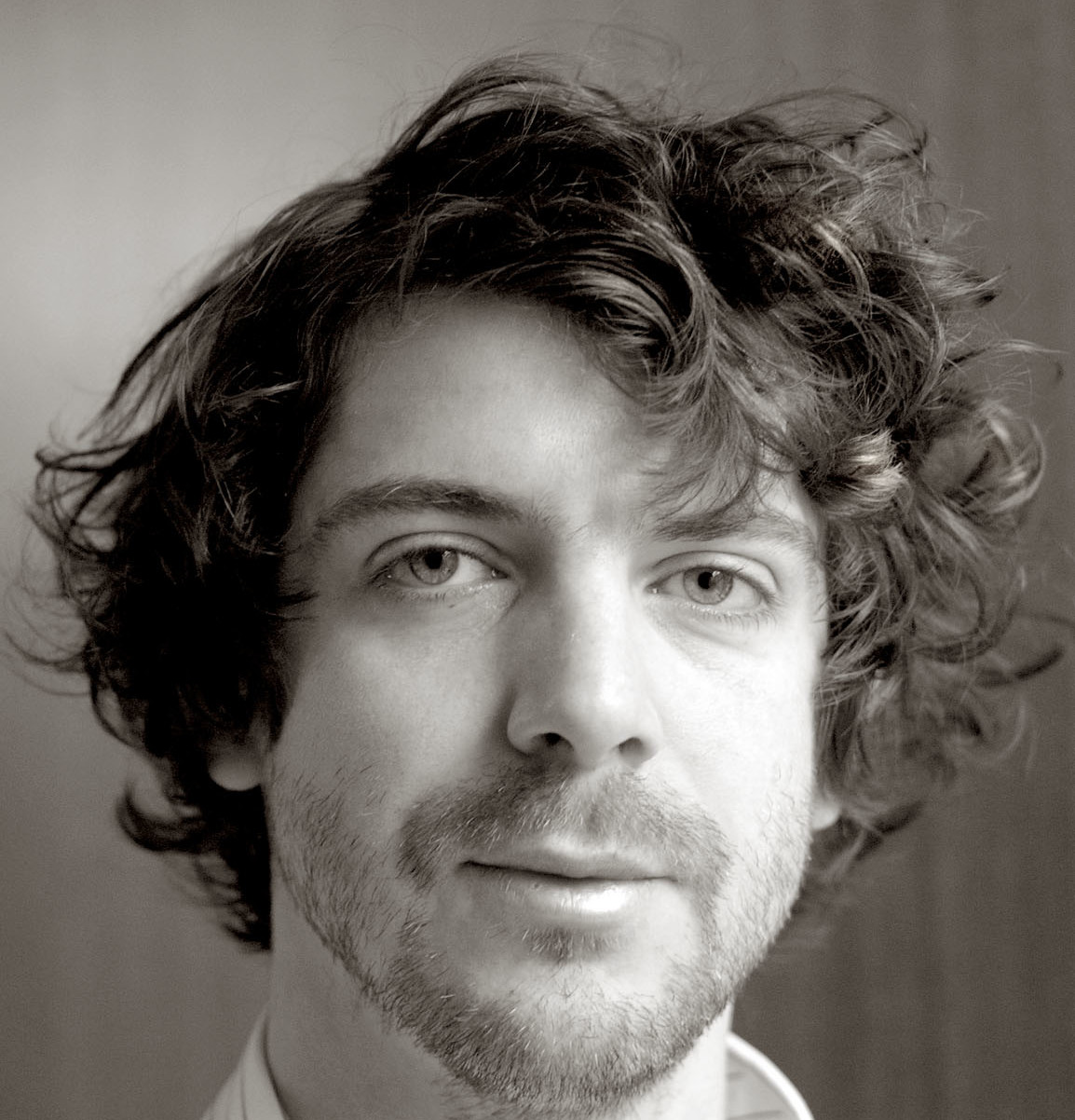
- Born: 28 January 1974 (age 52); Rotterdam, Netherlands
- Occupations: Writer, poet. actor
- Writing career
- Period: 1995–present

Ramsey Nasr (born 28 January 1974) is a Dutch author and actor of mixed Palestinian and Dutch descent.

He was born in Rotterdam. He was Dichter des Vaderlands (Poet of the Fatherland; an unofficial title for the Dutch poet laureate) between January 2009 and January 2013. The concept of this was created by the Dutch newspaper NRC, the Nederlandse Programma Stichting and the foundation Poetry International in January 2000. Before Nasr was Poet of the City of Antwerp, Belgium, in 2005. In 2005, he received the Hugues C. Pernath-prijs.

In June 2014, an adaptation for the stage (in Dutch) of Ayn Rand's novel The Fountainhead (Toneelgroep Amsterdam) was presented at the Holland Festival, directed by Ivo van Hove, with Nasr as Howard Roark.

== Filmography ==
- 1995 Frans en Duits
- 1998 Thuisfront
- 1999 One Man and His Dog
- 2000 Mariken
- 2001 Liefje
- 2001 Magonia
- 2002 The Enclave
- 2003 Hotel Bellevue
- 2004 Armando
- 2004 Mon ange
- 2005 Live!
- 2008 In Real Life
- 2011 Goltzius and the Pelican Company

== TV series ==
- 2011-2015 Overspel The Adulterer
- 2019-2025 Oogappels

== Toneelgroep Amsterdam ==
- 2014 Mary Stuart - Davison
- 2013-2016 Long Day's Journey into Night - Jamie Tyrone
- 2014-2017 The Fountainhead - Howard Roark
- 2015-2017 Kings of War - Henry V, Richmond
- 2015-2017 Husbands and Wives - Gabe
- 2015-2017 The other voice - Hoofdrol
- 2016-2017 Roman Tragedies - Menenius, Lepidus

Cultural offices
Preceded by Driek van Wissen	Dutch Poet Laureate "Dichter des Vaderlands"; 2009 – 2013	Succeeded by Anne Vegter
