= Gerrit Kouwenaar =

Dutch writer and poet

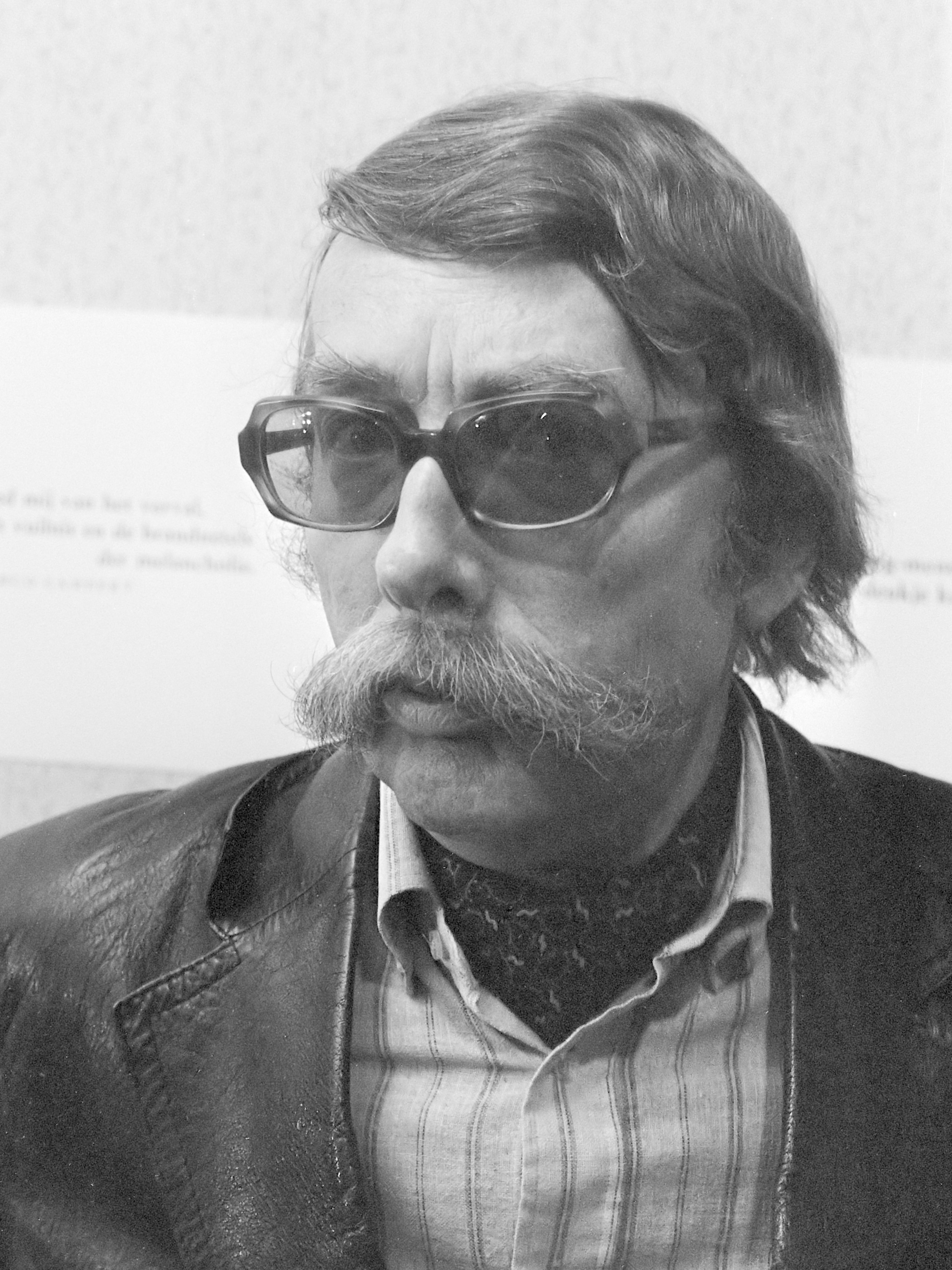
- Gerrit Kouwenaar in November 1978
- Born: 9 August 1923; Amsterdam, Netherlands
- Died: 4 September 2014 (aged 91); Amsterdam, Netherlands
- Occupation: Novelist
- Years active: 1941–2008

Gerrit Kouwenaar (9 August 1923 – 4 September 2014) was a Dutch journalist, translator, poet and prose writer.

== Biography ==
Kouwenaar was born in Amsterdam, North Holland. In the early 1940s, during the Nazi occupation of the Netherlands, he wrote various clandestine publications (the first in 1941), and worked for the illegal newspaper Parade der Profeten. He was arrested for this and sentenced to six months' imprisonment.

His first collection of poetry appeared in 1949, but he gained wider attention as a member of the Dutch poetry group known as the Vijftigers - the '50s poets'. Kouwenaar worked for magazines and newspapers such as Vrij Nederland, De Waarheid, and Het Vrije Volk. Kouwenaar was awarded the Martinus Nijhoff Prize in 1967 for his translation work.

In 1970, he was given the P. C. Hooft Award. Kouwenaar later won the 1989 Dutch Literature Prize. In 2009, the Society of Dutch Literature named Kouwenaar the recipient of its annual honor. His last published work was released on 9 August 2008, Kouwenaar's eighty-fifth birthday.

Gerrit Kouwenaar's older brother was the painter and poet David Kouwenaar (1921–2011). Kouwenaar died on 4 September 2014 in Amsterdam, aged 91.
