= Emiel van Moerkerken =

Dutch filmmaker (born 1916)

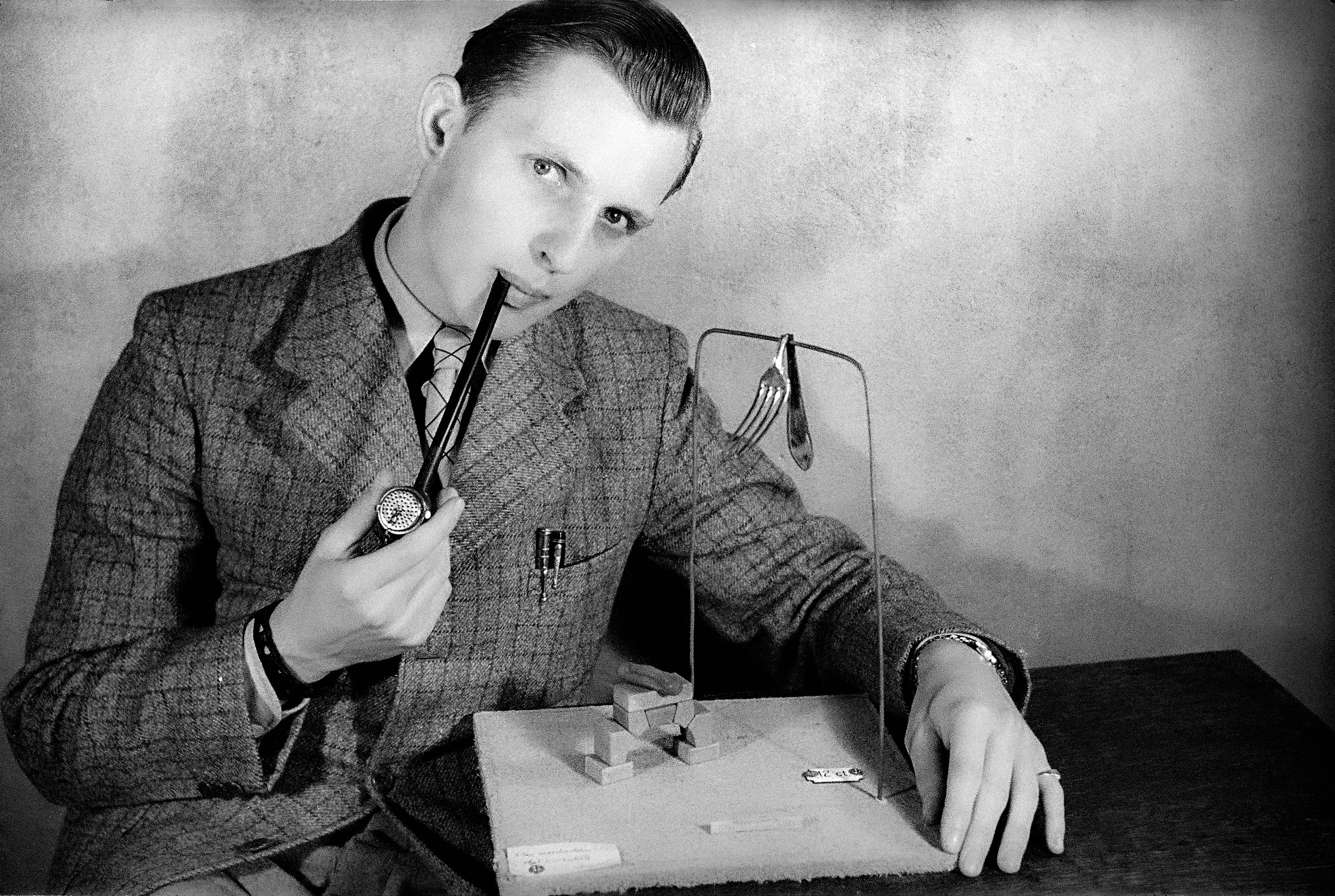
- Self-portrait, 1936
- Born: August 15, 1916; Haarlem, Netherlands
- Died: March 6, 1995 (aged 79); Amsterdam, Netherlands
- Occupation(s): Photographer, filmmaker, writer
- Years active: 1930–1995
- Awards: Golden Calf (1983)

Emiel van Moerkerken, also known as Emile van Moerkerken (August 15, 1916 – March 6, 1995), was a Dutch (surrealist) photographer, filmmaker, and writer. Van Moerkerken is regarded as one of the most prominent surrealist artists in the Netherlands during the 1930s and 1940s of the 20th century. He was the son of the writer Prof Dr P.H. van Moerkerken, the grandson of the staunchly anti-Catholic theologian Tjeerd Cannegieter. During World War II, Van Moerkerken collaborated with, among others, C. Buddingh', Louis Th. Lehmann, Theo van Baaren, and Gertrude Pape on the surrealist magazine "De Schone Zakdoek." In 1983, Van Moerkerken received a Golden Calf for his film Next Year in Holysloot.

== Biography ==
As a scion of an artistic family, Van Moerkerken's interest in photography was piqued at an early age. His father, Prof. Dr. P.H. van Moerkerken, was a writer and director at the Rijksacademie van Beeldende Kunsten in Amsterdam. Through his mother, Johanna Petronella Cannegieter, he was introduced to photography at a young age. During trips to Paris with his parents in the 1920s, the young Van Moerkerken took his first photographs. From 1931 he attended the Odenwaldschule in Germany, where he began experimenting with both photography and filmmaking. At the age of sixteen, he enrolled in the Film Technical Course under the guidance of Willem Bon, and in 1934 he created his first film, Sonate'34 an artistic and experimental venture.

Throughout the 1930s Van Moerkerken spent a significant amount of time in Paris, where he crossed paths with luminaries such as Brassaï, Salvador Dalí, André Breton, and Man Ray. He was part of the surrealist circles. In 1938, he was invited by Breton to publish his photographs in the magazine Minotaure. However, Van Moerkerken declined to sign the new surrealist manifesto due to differences within the communist movement. Consequently, Breton showed him the door.

During World War II, Emiel worked on communist resistance films and collaborated on the surrealist magazine "De Schone Zakdoek" alongside figures like C. Buddingh', Louis Th. Lehmann, Theo van Baaren, and Gertrude Pape. This magazine remained concealed from Nazi censorship due to its limited circulation.

After the war, he increasingly focused on portrait photography and created hundreds of portraits of renowned writers and artists, including Brassaï, Willem Frederik Hermans, Annie M.G. Schmidt, Bertolt Brecht, Gerard Reve, and even the Shah of Persia, Mohammad Reza Pahlavi. Many of these photographs continue to be used as cover images to this day. Van Moerkerken also ventured into the film industry and contributed to the 1949 film The Third Man, featuring Orson Welles. He produced several films, with De Wadlopers being showcased at the 1950 Cannes Film Festival.

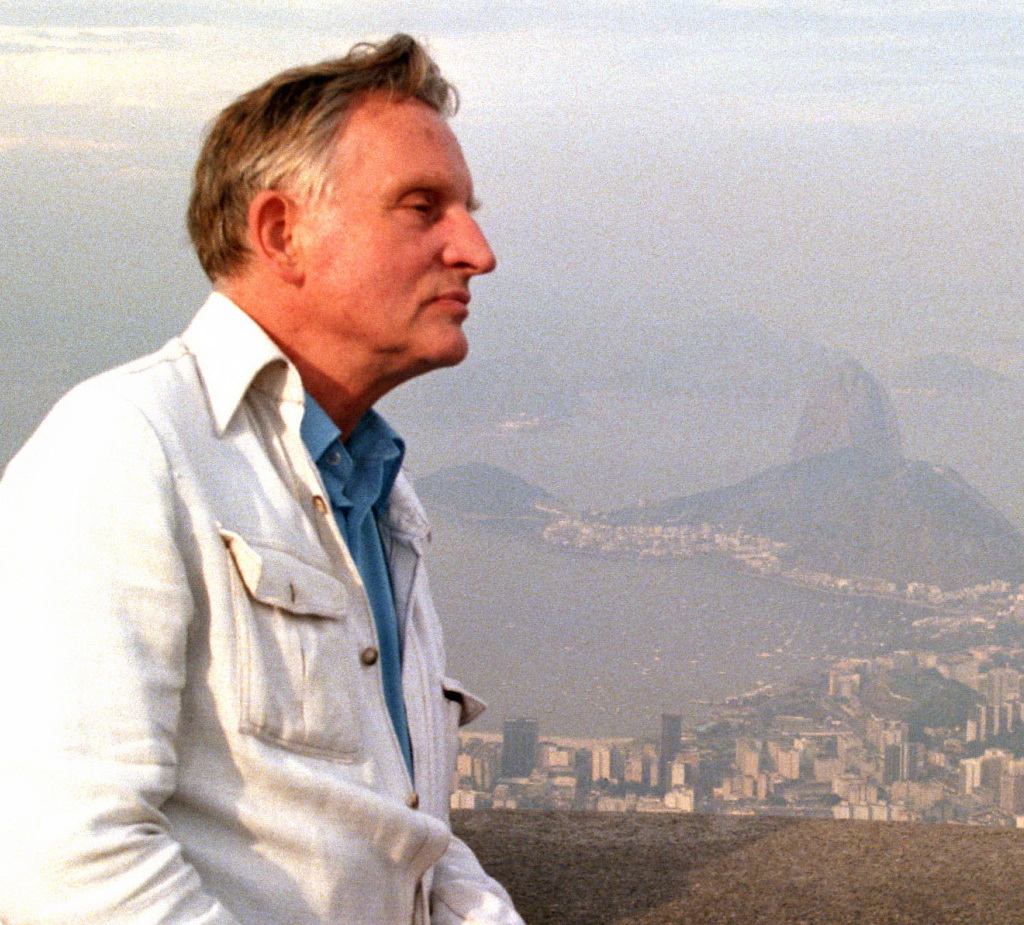
Van Moerkerken in Rio de Janeiro, 1986

From 1967 to 1979 Van Moerkerken was a lecturer in film and camera technology and perceptual psychology at the Netherlands Film Academy in Amsterdam. Additionally, from 1966 to 1981, he held the position of senior researcher at the psychological laboratory of the University of Amsterdam, within the Department of Functional psychology.

In 1983 Van Moerkerken received a Golden Calf award for his short film Next Year in Holysloot, in which he also played the lead role. The film revolves around a blind man journeying through various landscapes worldwide en route to Holysloot, serving as a metaphor for filmmakers who become fixated on the allure of Hollywood fame.

On March 6, 1995 Van Moerkerken died in Amsterdam at the age of 78. Although he always viewed himself as a filmmaker rather than a photographer, his surrealistic photographs from the 1930s and 1940s gained increasing recognition after his demise. He remains the sole Dutch photographer from that era to have captured such a significant volume of images closely aligned with the international surrealist visual language.

== Photos in public collections (selection) ==
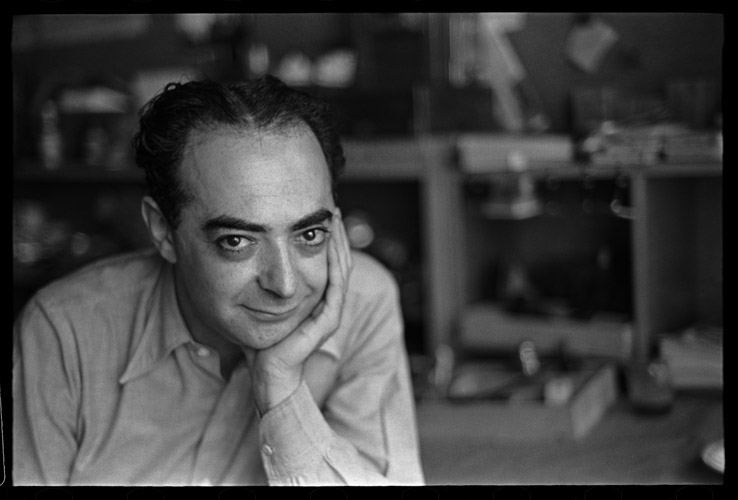
Brassaï (1936, portrait by Van Moerkerken)

- Rijksmuseum Amsterdam
- Stedelijk Museum Amsterdam
- Centraal Museum in Utrecht
- Fotomuseum Den Haag
- Instituut Collectie Nederland (ICN).
- Stadsarchief Amsterdam
- Literatuurmuseum, Den Haag

== Photography ==
=== Photo Books (Monographs) ===
- Emiel van Moerkerken (2011), a comprehensive overview of Emiel van Moerkerken's work. It also includes an extensive essay on his life and work by Minke Vos.
- Foto's (1989)
- Meisjes van Nederland (1959), with text by Jan Blokker.
- Amsterdam (1957) with an introduction by Adriaan Morriën.
- Reportages in licht en schaduw (1947), with an introduction by Simon Carmiggelt.

== Portrait photographs taken by Van Moerkerken ==
Van Moerkerken captured numerous writers, poets, and visual artists during their early and debut periods:

A. Alberts, 1953; Theo van Baaren, 1944; J. Bernlef, 1963; Willem Bon, 1935; Menno ter Braak, 1939; Brassaï, 1936; Bertolt Brecht, 1954; L.E.J. Brouwer, 1944; Simon Carmiggelt, 1947; Max Dendermonde, 1943; Lodewijk van Deyssel, 1934; Günter Eich, 1954; Jan Elburg, 1946; Emile Erens, 1936, 1941; Frans Erens, 1929, 1930; Chr.J. van Geel, 1938, 1941, 1961	André Gide, 1946; Willem Frederik Hermans, 1951, 1963; Joris Ivens, 1947; Egon Erwin Kisch, 1935; Jef Last, 1934, 1936, 1948, 1961; Halldór Laxness, 1963; Paul Léautaud, 1946; Louis Th. Lehmann, 1939, 1942, 1949, 1953; Doeschka Meijsing, 1975; Henry Miller, 1960; Bruno van Moerkerken, several years; Pieter Hendrik van Moerkerken jr., Several years; Henry de Montherlant, 1946; Adriaan Morriën, 1944, 1955; Geert van Oorschot (R.J. Peskens), 1946; Mohammad Reza Pahlavi, 1960; E. du Perron, 1939; Gerard Reve, 1955	Adriaan Roland Holst, 1943, 1948; Frank Rubin, 1955, 1964; Renate Rubinstein, 1968; Koos Schuur, 1946; Annie M.G. Schmidt, 1950]; Albert Vigoleis Thelen, 1953; Stefan Themerson, 1972; Simon Vestdijk, 1939; Boris Vian, 1954; Dolf Verspoor, 1936, 1951, 1974; Victor van Vriesland, 1947; Carel Willink, 1943; Jan Wit, 1940; Jan Wolkers, 1963

== Films ==
The following (short) films are all housed in the Eye Filmmuseum in Amsterdam.

- Next Year in Holysloot (1983). This film received the Golden Calf for Best Short Film in 1983.
- Maison Picasiette (1977)
- Magic Picture Book (1976)
- Sonata Chipolata (1973)
- Improvisatie (1972)
- Droompaleis, Le palais idéal du Facteur Cheval (VPRO, 1969)
- Feuillefilm 5 (VPRO, 1967)
- Bergtoppen in de oceaan (Zomerdagen op de Faeröer) (VPRO, 1966)
- Signalement van de hik (1965)
- Au revoir (1964)
- IJsland (1963)
- Good Morning (1963)
- De Wadlopers (1959), screened at the Cannes Film Festival under the title: Les Alpinistes de la Mer
- The Cuckoo Waltz (Koekoekswals) (1955)
- Chomeniki (1948)
- Limehouse Blues (1936–1948)
- Na 100 jaar (Spoorwegfilm) (cinematography, 1939)
- Kijkjes in de dierentuin (1936: unfinished)
- Sonate (1934)

== Bibliography ==
=== Under the pseudonym: Eric Terduyn ===
- De IJsprinses (1982)
- Volgend jaar in Holysloot (1979)
- Samen uit samen thuis (1957)
