= Holte (surname) =

Holte or Holthe is a surname. Notable people with the surname include:

- Holte baronets
  - Sir Thomas Holte, 1st Baronet (1571–1654), English owner of Aston Hall
  - Sir Robert Holte, 2nd Baronet (?-1679)
  - Sir Charles Holte, 3rd Baronet (1649–1722)
  - Sir Clobery Holte, 4th Baronet (1682–1729)
  - Sir Lister Holte, 5th Baronet (1720–1770)
  - Sir Charles Holte, 6th Baronet (1721–1782)
- Amoene van Haersolte (née Van Holthe tot Echten), Dutch noblewoman and author; winner of first P. C. Hooft Award
- Anders Holte (1849–1937), Norwegian sea captain and navigator
- Arne Holte (1946–), Norwegian psychologist
- Beatrix von Holte (ca.1250–1327), Prince Abbess of Essen from 1292 to 1327
- Burchard von Holte (?-1118), Bishop of Münster from 1098 to 1118
- Eva Bull Holte (1922–1993), Norwegian painter, wife of J. B.
- Fritz Christian Holte (1925–2015), Norwegian economist
- Geir Holte (born 1959), Norwegian cross country skier, brother of Tor Håkon
- Johan Berthin Holte (1915–2002), Norwegian businessperson, husband of E. B.
- Josef Holte (1912–1944), German soldier
- Jørgen Holte (1944–), Norwegian politician
- Knut Holte (footballer) (1967–), Norwegian footballer
- Lars Holte (1966–), Norwegian DJ
- Patricia Louise Holte (1944–), stage name Patti LaBelle
- Ludolf von Holte (?–1247), Bishop of Münster from 1226 to 1247
- Poppo von Paderborn (?–1083), possibly Poppo von Holte, Bishop of Paderborn from 1076
- Tess Uriza Holthe (1966–), Filipino-American writer
- Tor Håkon Holte (born 1958), Norwegian cross country skier, brother of Geir
- Wigbold von Holte (?–1304), Archbishop of Cologne (Köln) from 1297 to 1304
- Wilhelm I. von Holte (?–1260), Bishop of Münster from 1259 to 1260

== See also ==
- Holt (surname)
