= Ouwens =

Ouwens is a surname. Notable people with the surname include:

- Eddy Ouwens (born 1946), Dutch musician and record producer
- Kees Ouwens (1944–2004), Dutch novelist and poet
- Peter Ouwens (1849–1922), Dutch scientist
