= P. C. Hooft Award =

Dutch literature award

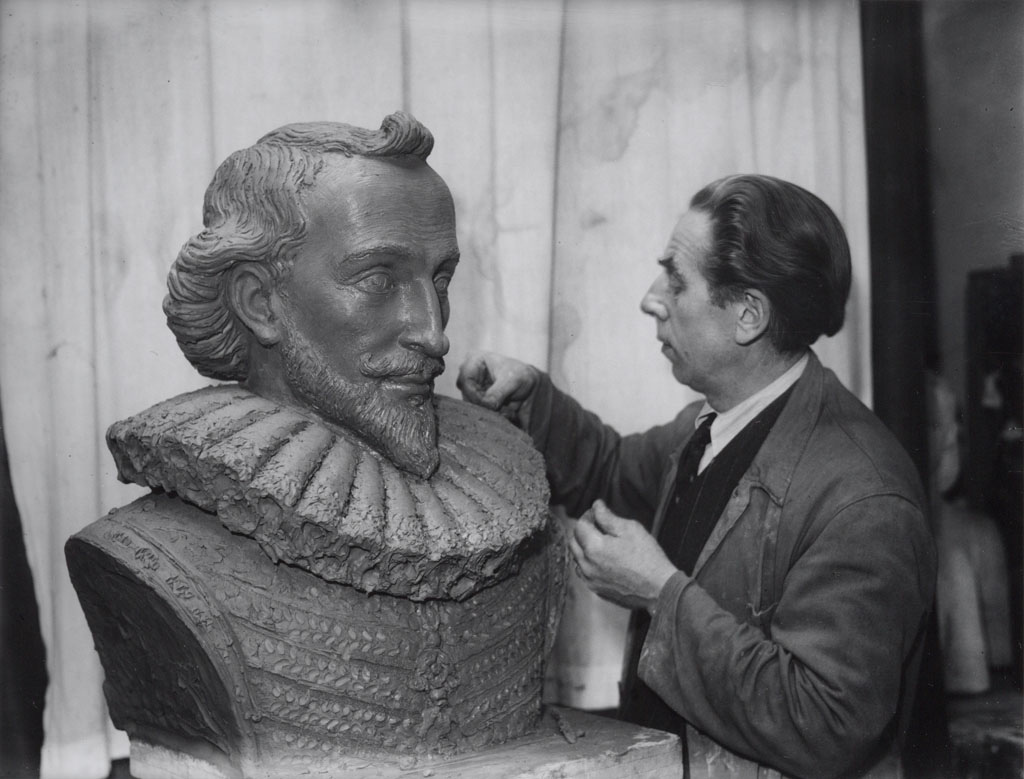
Sculptor Frits Sieger with bust of P.C. Hooft. Amsterdam; 22 March 1947

The P.C. Hooft Award (in Dutch: P.C. Hooft-prijs), inaugurated in 1948, is a Dutch-language literary lifetime-achievement award named after 17th-century Dutch poet and playwright Pieter Corneliszoon Hooft. The award is made annually.

== Background ==
Established in 1948, initially as an award of the state, winners are selected from alternating categories: prose (fiction), essays (non-fiction) and poetry. Winners of the prize receive €60,000.

In 1984, the relationship between the State of the Netherlands and the independent Foundation that puts forward the winner came under pressure when the jury nominated columnist Hugo Brandt Corstius. The Minister of Culture at the time, Elco Brinkman, refused to award the prize to Corstius because of Corstius' perceived inappropriate comments against the government and the then Prime Minister Ruud Lubbers. As a result of the uproar, the prize was not awarded in 1984, 1985 and 1986. In 1987, with a re-established fully independent committee, the prize was as yet awarded to Corstius.

== Award winners ==
- 1947 – Amoene van Haersolte
- 1947 – Arthur van Schendel
- 1948 – A. M. Hammacher
- 1949 – Gerrit Achterberg
- 1950 – Simon Vestdijk
- 1951 – E. J. Dijksterhuis
- 1952 – J. C. Bloem
- 1953 – Ferdinand Bordewijk
- 1954 – L. J. Rogier
- 1955 – Adriaan Roland Holst
- 1956 – Anna Blaman
- 1957 – Pieter Geyl
- 1958 – Pierre Kemp
- 1959 – not awarded
- 1960 – Victor E. van Vriesland
- 1961 – H. W. J. M. Keuls
- 1962 – Theun de Vries
- 1963 – F. G. L. van der Meer
- 1964 – Leo Vroman
- 1965 – not awarded
- 1966 – Anton van Duinkerken
- 1967 – Lucebert
- 1968 – Gerard Kornelis van het Reve
- 1969 – not awarded
- 1970 – Gerrit Kouwenaar
- 1971 – Willem Frederik Hermans (award refused)
- 1972 – Abel J. Herzberg
- 1973 – Hendrik de Vries
- 1974 – Simon Carmiggelt
- 1975 – Rudy Kousbroek
- 1976 – Remco Campert
- 1977 – Harry Mulisch
- 1978 – Cornelis Verhoeven
- 1979 – Ida Gerhardt
- 1980 – Willem Brakman
- 1981 – Karel van het Reve
- 1982 – M. Vasalis
- 1983 – Hella S. Haasse
- 1984 – not awarded
- 1985 – not awarded
- 1986 – not awarded
- 1987 – Hugo Brandt Corstius
- 1988 – Rutger Kopland
- 1989 – Jan Wolkers (award refused)
- 1990 – Kees Fens
- 1991 – Elisabeth Eybers
- 1992 – Anton Koolhaas
- 1993 – Gerrit Komrij
- 1994 – J. Bernlef
- 1995 – A. Alberts
- 1996 – K. Schippers
- 1997 – Judith Herzberg
- 1998 – F. B. Hotz
- 1999 – Arthur Lehning
- 2000 – Eva Gerlach
- 2001 – Gerrit Krol
- 2002 – Sem Dresden
- 2003 – H. H. ter Balkt
- 2004 – Cees Nooteboom
- 2005 – Frédéric Bastet
- 2006 – H. C. ten Berge
- 2007 – Maarten Biesheuvel
- 2008 – Abram de Swaan
- 2009 – Hans Verhagen
- 2010 – Charlotte Mutsaers
- 2011 – H. J. A. Hofland
- 2012 – Tonnus Oosterhoff
- 2013 – A. F. Th. van der Heijden
- 2014 – Willem Jan Otten
- 2015 – Anneke Brassinga
- 2016 – Astrid Roemer
- 2017 – Bas Heijne
- 2018 - Nachoem Wijnberg
- 2019 - Marga Minco
- 2020 - Maxim Februari
- 2021 - Alfred Schaffer
- 2022 - Arnon Grunberg
- 2023 - Tijs Goldschmidt
F. Bordewijk (1953) (short film)

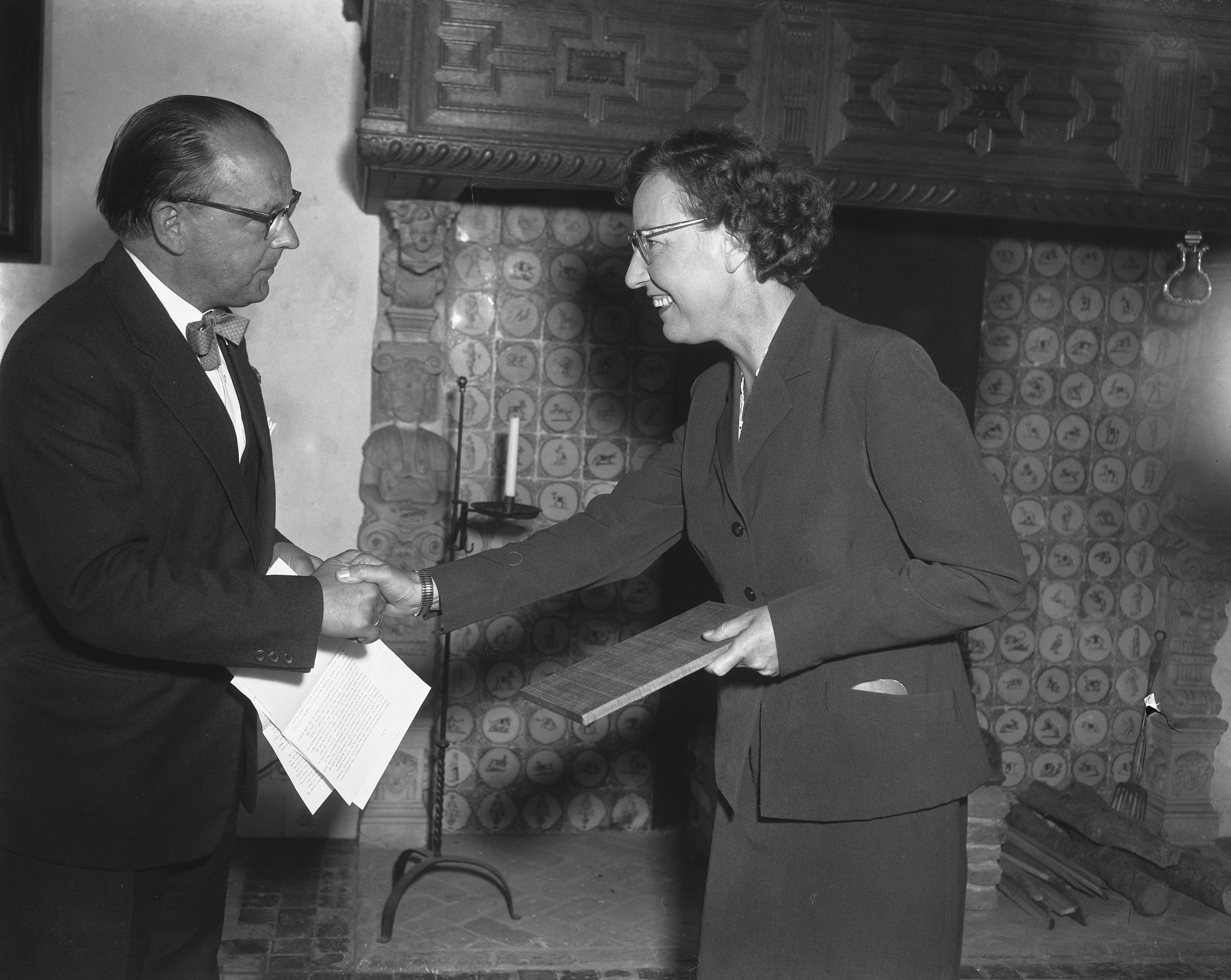
Anna Blaman (1956)

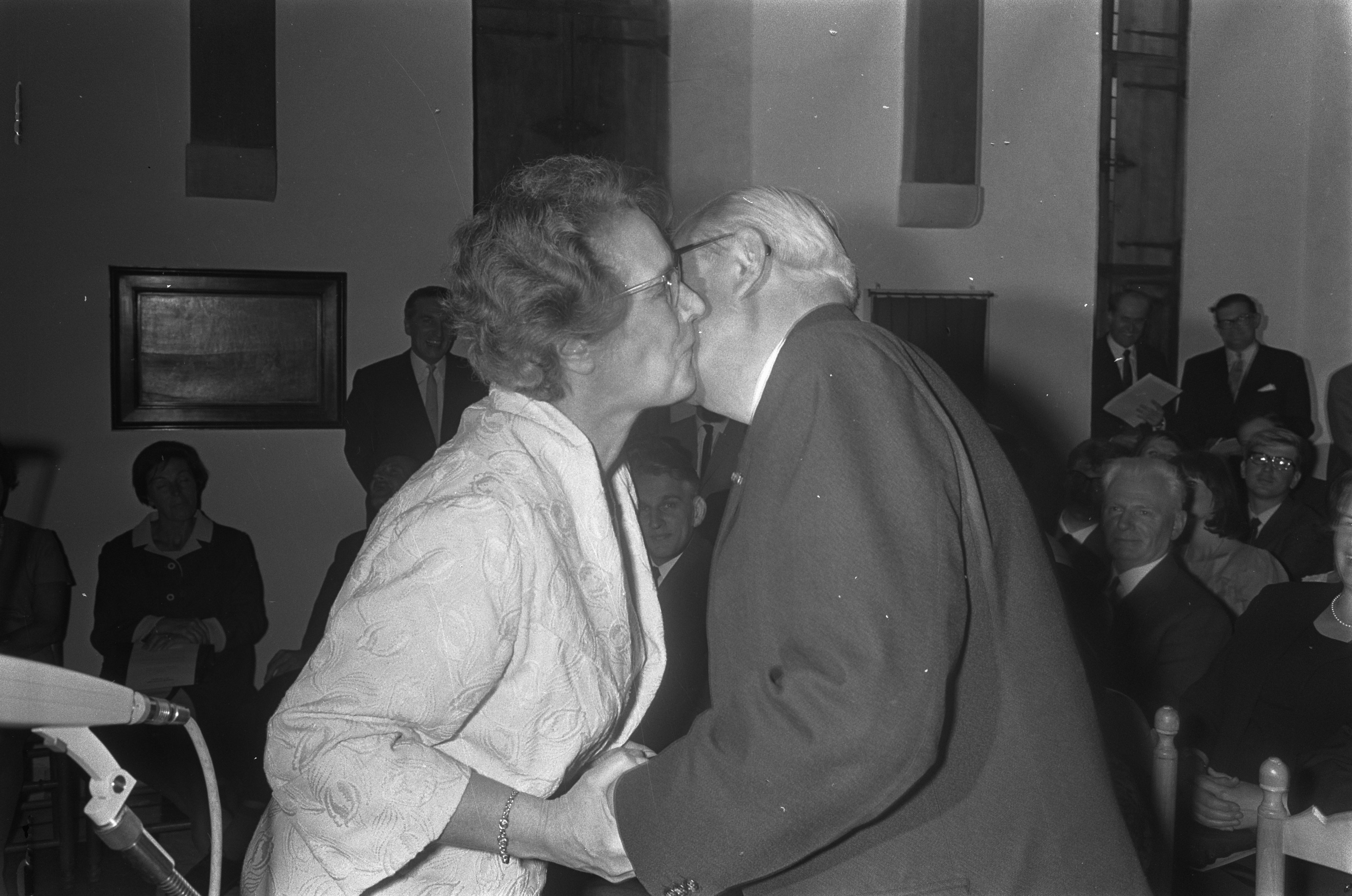
Anton van Duinkerken (1966)

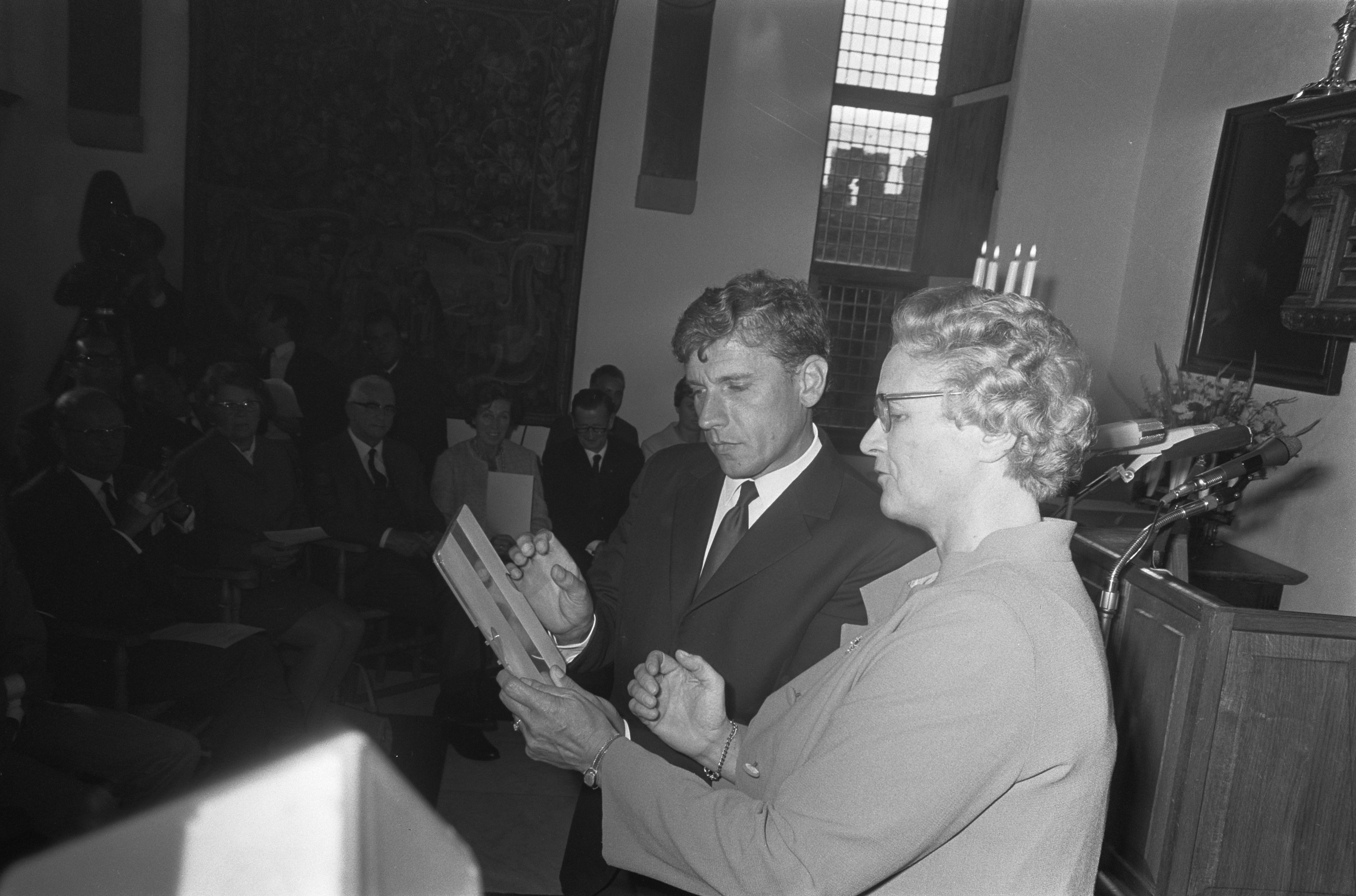
Gerard Reve (1968)

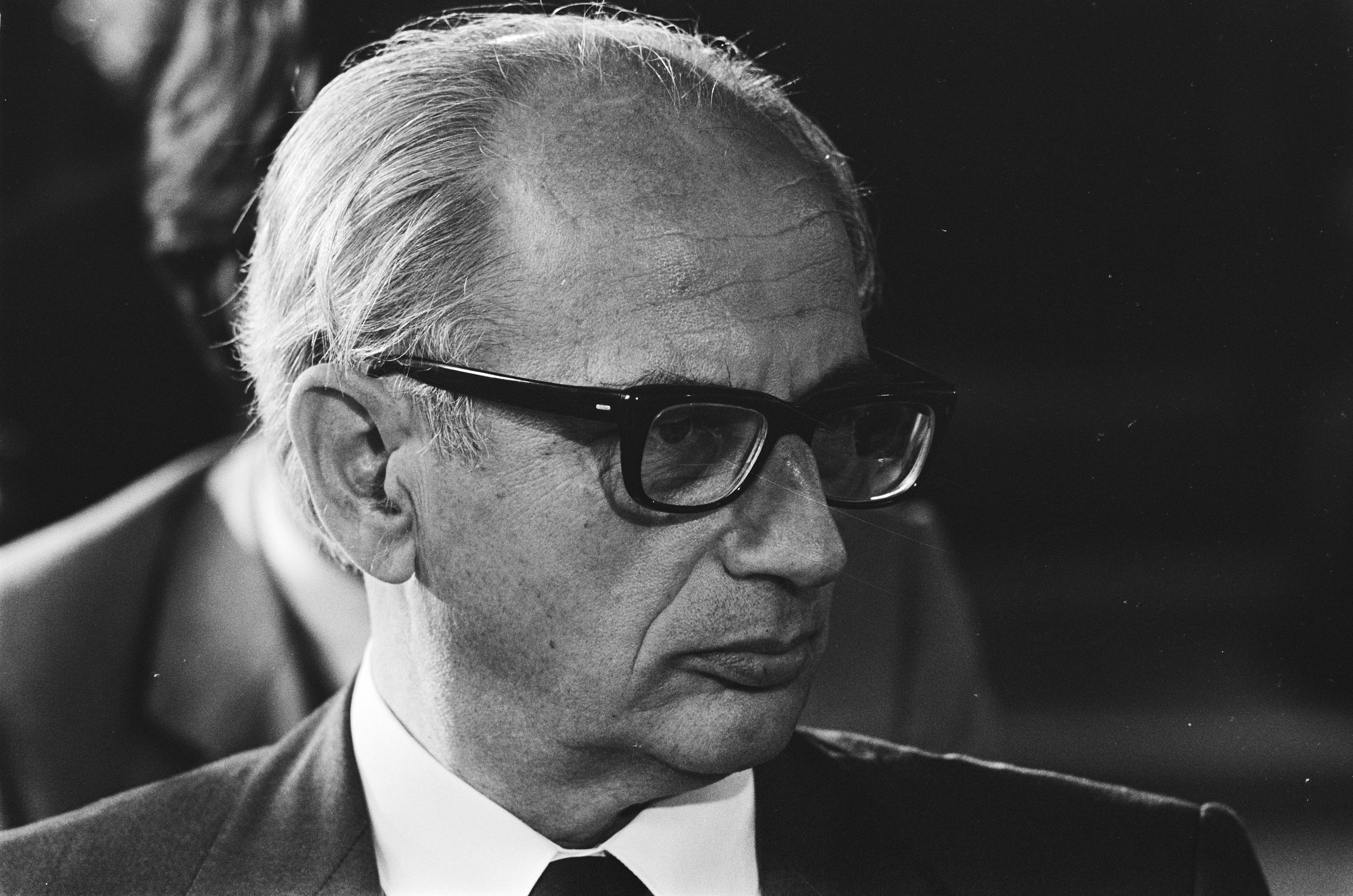
Karel van het Reve (1981)

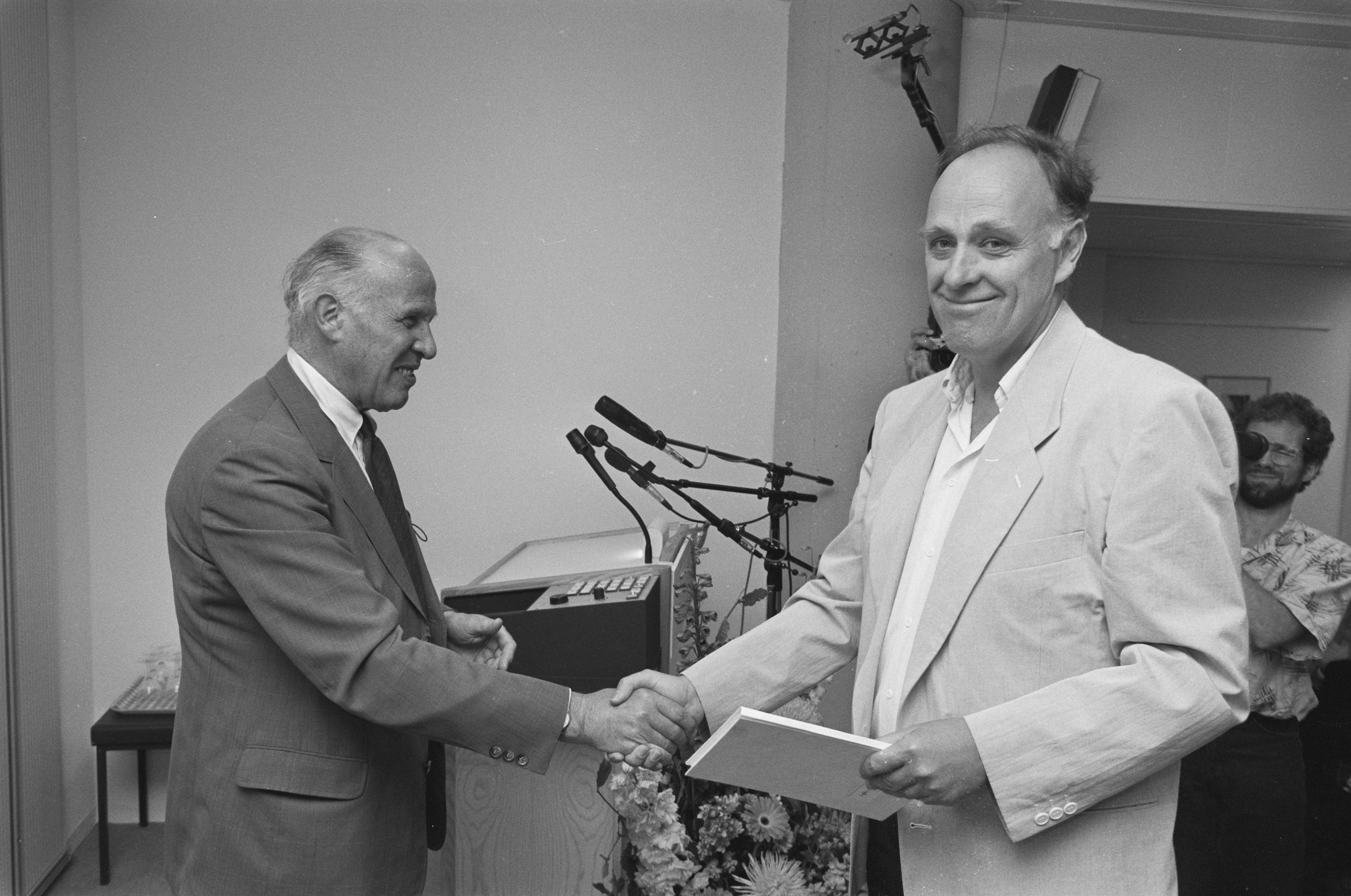
Hugo Brandt Corstius (1987)
