= Het spook en de schaduw =

1966 novel by Simon Vestdijk

Het spook en de schaduw ("The ghost and the shadow") is a novel by Dutch author Simon Vestdijk. One of the later novels in Vestdijk's career, it was published in 1966 by Nijgh & Van Ditmar. Hella Haasse, in a lengthy analysis in her Lezen achter de letters, calls it a "novel of conscience", and one of his most cynical ones. Agnes Andeweg notes Gothic elements in the novel.

== Plot ==
The plot revolves around the rather undeveloped, faceless Peter Höllriegl, an Austrian soldier during World War II who returns home after Russian captivity. Silent and unable or unwilling to adapt to a normal life at home, he is subjected to a variety of treatments and investigations, one of which concerned with paranormal occurrences surrounding his homecoming and his presence: his homecoming was preceded by multiple appearances of a ghost in his mother's Gasthof. Two of the "investigators" are a retired geology professor from the German Rhineland, Dietrich Genzmer, and a Dutch businessman, Louis Holk, and their experiences with Peter are recounted in the first and last of three parts. Peter, in the meantime, is apprenticed as a mountain guide but quits without explanation. A trip he takes with some old friend to a fair ends in confusion when the young men, drunk, attend a private sex show and Peter explodes in rage when a young woman is groped.

The middle part concerns Peter's family, which on the advice of their doctor sends him to a local monastery which also operates a pilgrimage church and a bar/restaurant; Jakobus, a monk who in a previous life was active in the city, is charged with attempting to understand what happened to Peter in Russia and why he is as traumatized as he apparently is. The young woman who runs the bar develops a friendship with him; as it turns out she has also been traumatized and has been taken in to redeem a sexually compromised past. The section ends with Peter's return to his family after what appears to be a group of ghosts terrorizes the monastery.

In the third part, Holk and Genzmer return to the Gasthof, and attempt to draw Peter out by taking him on a mountain tour. While stopping near a cliff, a ghost appears and causes Peter to jump off the mountain. An explanation for his trauma is offered when (by chance) Peter's past in Soviet Russia is revealed: he had been part of a German garrison occupying a small village where they lived fairly peacefully with the locals, until orders came that those locals were to be killed—which they did, in a variety of ways involving torture and denigration.

== Genre ==
Vestdijk himself had defined the genres of psychological novel and novel of intrigue; the latter, he said, is the kind of novel mostly concerned with action and events and the consequences those events have on the characters. P. Kralt, in a monograph on Vestdijk's work, said Het spook en de schaduw, combines those two genres because of its plenitude of events great and small (all recounted in great, sometimes too great detail, as Kralt notes) while it focuses consistently on the effect of the protagonist's actions on the other characters.

== Landscape and themes ==
According to Haasse, the Alps, which figure frequently in Vestdijk's poetry and prose, represent a type of hell, a place which in all its whiteness and height attracts people and simultaneously rejects them: Haasse notes the similarity with Herman Melville's white whale in Moby-Dick, and the resemblance with the words Alp (German for "nightmare") and Albe (denoting white priestly vestments but also suggesting "elf" or "gnome"). His epistolary novel De overnachting (1947) has a plot line involving a love triangle in the Alps, his trilogy Symphonie van Victor Slingerland (1957-1959) is likewise partly set in the Austrian Alps, and De arme Heinrich (1958), Een Alpenroman (1961), and Het genadeschot (1964) are also Alpine novels. Het spook en de schaduw is set in the Eastern Alps of Tirol, in the Mieminger Chain, renamed "Diedinger chain" in the novel, with the mountain Serles (renamed "Erles") from the Stubai Alps dominating the view.

== Reception ==
The novel has received somewhat mixed reviews. A contemporary review in the Utrechts Nieuwsblad praised the author for his "marvelous storytelling technique". Kralt called it "a virtuoso novel" but unsatisfactory, lacking greatness. More recently, in a series reevaluating Vestdijk's work for NRC Handelsblad, Dutch novelist Maarten 't Hart ridiculed the novel as "endless chatter about demons and ghosts", and criticized Vestdijk's style and the appearance of "real" ghosts. 't Hart concludes that the novel (which he thinks might be inspired by William Faulkner's Soldiers' Pay) shows "les defaults de ses qualités", and reserves praise only for the characterization of Höllriegl.
