= Willem Brakman =

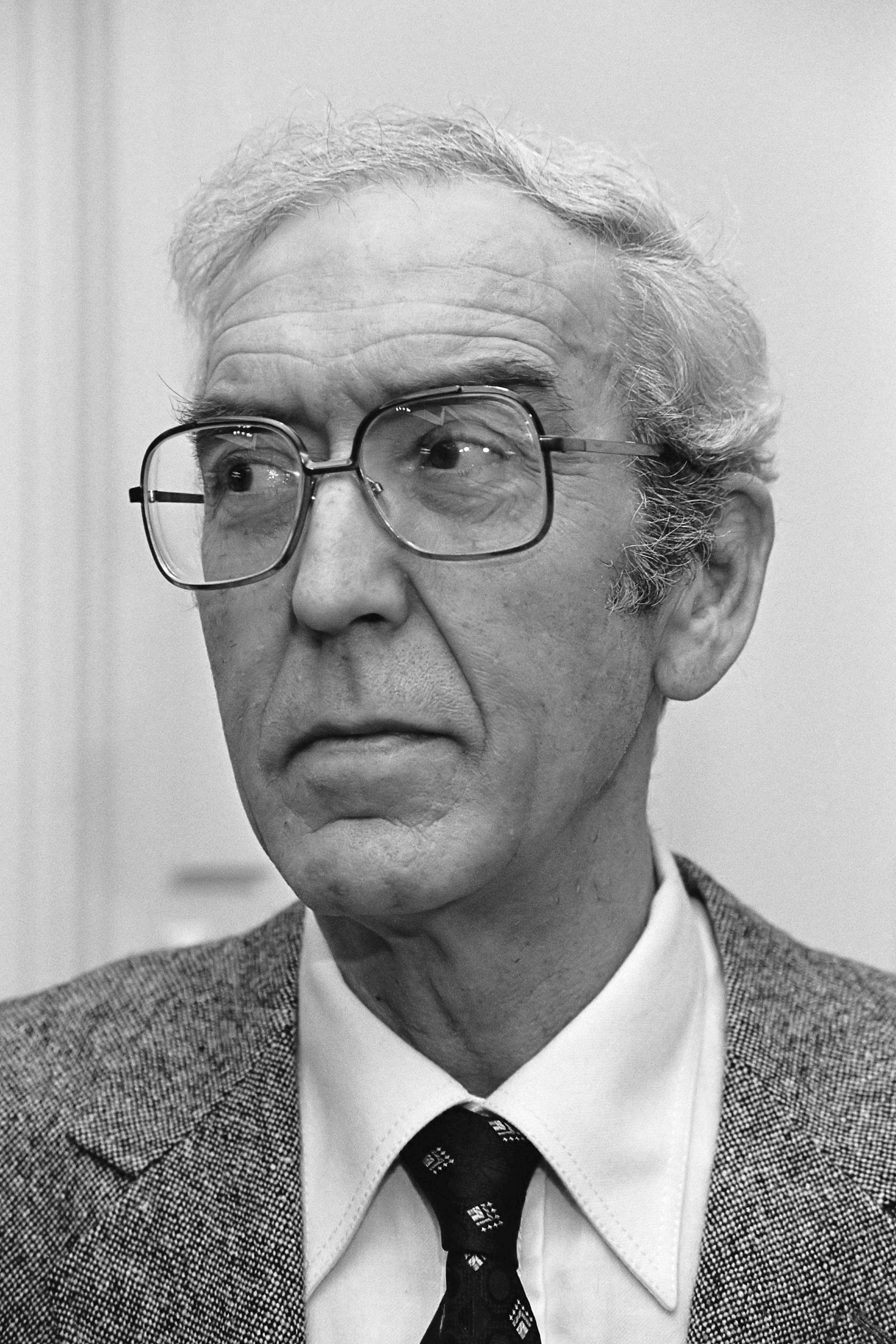
- Willem Brakman (1979)
- Born: Willem Pieter Jacobus Brakman; 13 June 1922; The Hague, Netherlands
- Died: 8 May 2008 (aged 85); Boekelo, Overijssel, Netherlands
- Writing career
- Language: Dutch
- Notable awards: P. C. Hooft Award (1980)

Willem Pieter Jacobus Brakman (13 June 1922 – 8 May 2008) was a Dutch writer who made his literary debut with the novel Een winterreis in 1961. Brakman received the P. C. Hooft Award in 1980. He was born on June 13, 1922 in The Hague, Netherlands, and died on May 8, 2008 in the same country.

== Selected works ==
- 1961 – Een winterreis (novel)
- 1978 – Zes subtiele verhalen
- 1998 – Ante diluvium (novel)
- 1998 – De koning is dood (novel)
- 1999 – Het onlieflijke stadje E.
- 2004 – De afwijzing (novel)
- 2006 – Naar de zee, om het strand te zien

== Awards ==
- 1962: Lucy B. and C.W. van der Hoogt Award (for Een winterreis)
- 1979: Ferdinand Bordewijk Prijs (for Zes subtiele verhalen)
- 1980: P. C. Hooft Award
