= F.C. Terborgh =

Dutch diplomat, prose writer and poet

F.C. Terborgh (14 January 1902 in Den Helder – 26 February 1981 in Linho Sintra), was the pseudonym of Reijnier Flaes, a Dutch diplomat, prose writer and poet. He was the 1971 recipient of the Constantijn Huygens Prize.

== Works ==
- 1929 - Das Problem der Territorialkonflikte (dissertation)
- 1940 - De condottiere
- 1947 - Het gezicht van Peñafiel
- 1949 - Slauerhoff. Herinneringen en brieven
- 1954 - De meester van de Laërtes
- 1958 - Padroëns
- 1962 - Sierra Solana
- 1964 - De Turkenoorlog
- 1969 - Abyla
- 1970 - Odysseus' laatste tocht
- 1972 - Verhalen
