= Pierre Kemp =

Dutch poet and painter (1886–1967)

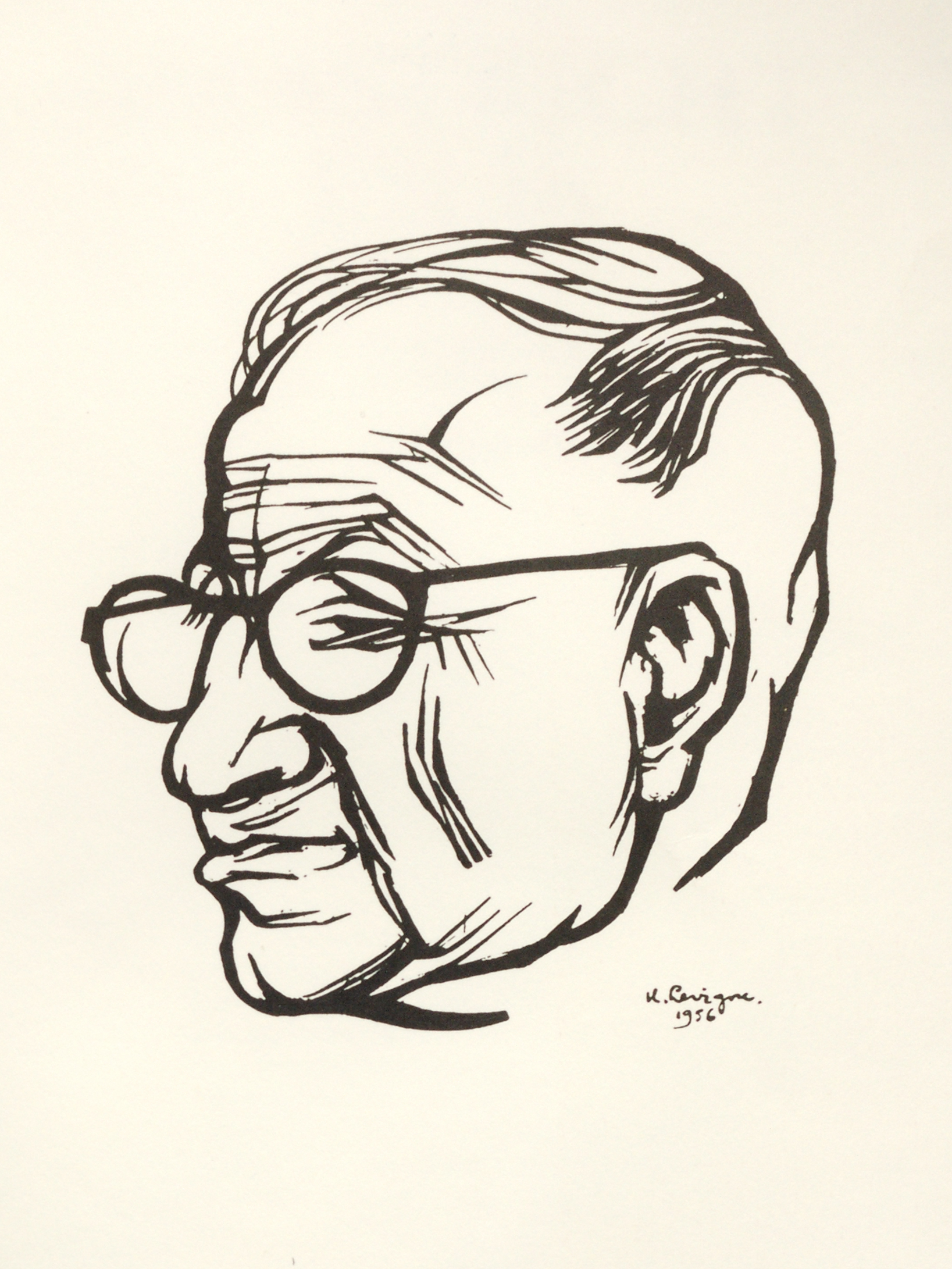
Portrait of Pierre Kemp by Hub. Levigne

Pierre Kemp (1 December 1886 – 21 July 1967) was a Dutch poet and painter, the recipient of the Constantijn Huygens Prize in 1956 and the P. C. Hooft Award in 1958. His younger brother was the writer Mathias Kemp.

Kemp was born in Maastricht and died there in 1967. In Limburg, the province where he was born, people made fun of his surname; in several dialects of Dutch and the regional Limburgian language, 'kemp' (as kennep and general Dutch hennep) is the colloquial term for marijuana.

== Works ==
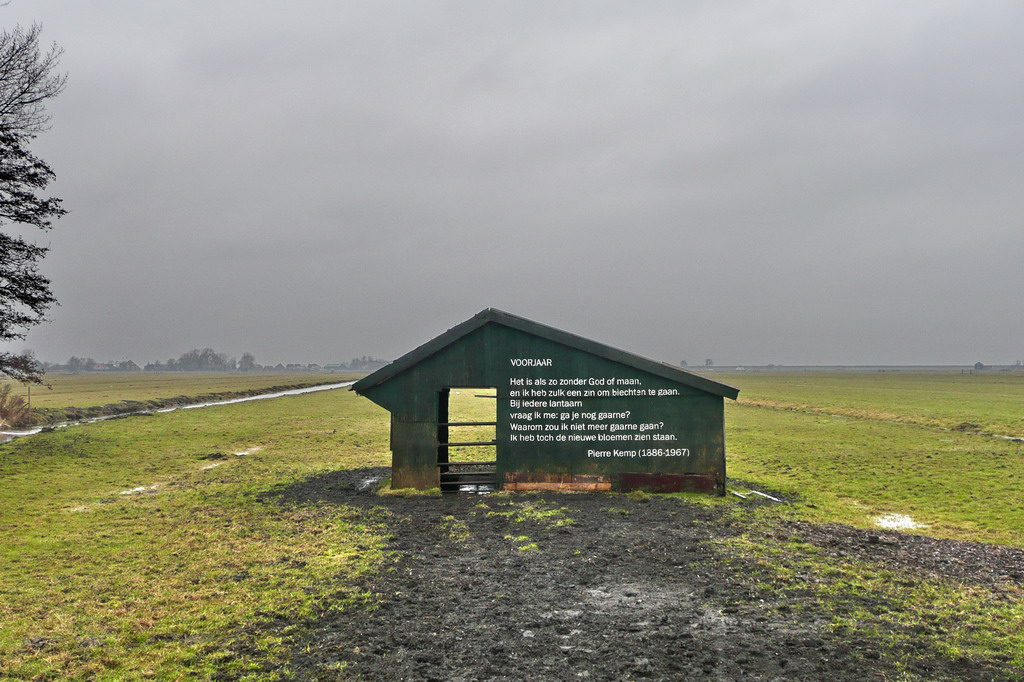
Kemp's poem Voorjaar (in Warder)

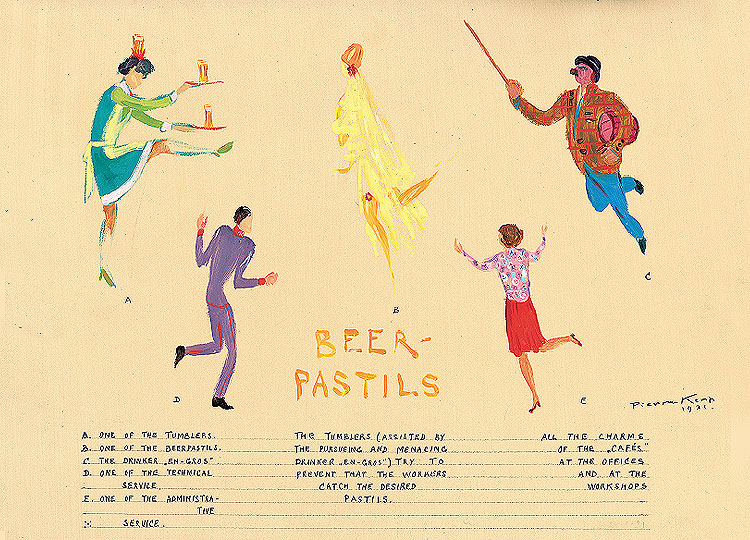
Drawing by Pierre Kemp

- 1914 - Het wondere lied
- 1916 - De bruid der onbekende zee en andere gedichten
- 1925 - Limburgs Sagenboek
- 1928 - Carmina Matrimonalia
- 1934 - Stabielen en passanten
- 1935 - Zuster Beatrijs
- 1938 - Fugitieven en constanten
- 1940 - Transitieven en immobielen
- 1946 - Pacific
- 1946 - Standard-book of classic blacks
- 1947 - Phototropen en noctophilen
- 1949 - Forensen voor Cythère en andere gedichten
- 1956 - Engelse verfdoos
- 1958 - Vijf families en één poederblauw
- 1959 - Emeritaat
- 1959 - Garden, 36, 22, 36 inches
- 1960 - Les Folies Maestrichtoises
- 1961 - De incomplete luisteraar
- 1961 - Au Pays du Tendre mosan
- 1965 - Perzische suite voor Dr. E.F. Tijdens
- 1976 - Verzameld werk
