= Gerrit Krol =

Dutch author, essayist and writer (1934–2013)

- Born: Gerrit Krol; 1 August 1934; Groningen, Netherlands
- Died: 24 November 2013 (aged 79); Groningen
- Education: University of Groningen
- Occupations: writer, poet, mathematician

Gerrit Krol (1 August 1934 − 24 November 2013) was a Dutch author, essayist and writer.

Krol was born in Groningen. He studied mathematics and worked with Royal Dutch Shell and some of its operating units as computer programmer and system designer. Krol's debut consisted of poems published in 1961 in various Dutch literary magazines. In 1962 his first book De rokken van Joy Scheepmaker was published. Thereafter, he developed a typical writing style consisting of text mingled with abstract thoughts expressed in drawings and mathematical equations. His novel Het gemillimeterde hoofd is typical for this Krollesque style.

In 1986 Krol received the Constantijn Huygens Prize, and in 2001 the P. C. Hooft Award - the highest Dutch Governmental award for literature - for his complete oeuvre. On 20 October 2005, the 125th anniversary of the Amsterdam Free University, Krol received a Doctorate Honoris causa from this university.

== Published works ==
- De rokken van Joy Scheepmaker, 1962
- Kwartslag, 1964
- De zoon van de levende stad, 1966
- Het gemillimeterde hoofd (English translation: The Cropped Head), 1967
- De ziekte van Middleton, 1969
- De laatste winter, 1970
- APPI, (essay) 1971
- De man van het lateraal denken, (essay) 1971
- De chauffeur verveelt zich, 1973
- In dienst van de 'Koninklijke', 1974
- Hoe ziet ons gevoel er uit?, essay 1974
- De gewone man en het geluk of Waarom het niet goed is lid van een vakbond te zijn, (essays) 1975
- Halte opgeheven, (short stories) 1976
- Polaroid, (poetry) 1976
- De weg naar Sacramento, 1977
- Over het huiselijk geluk en andere gedachten, (columns) 1978
- De t.v.-b.h., (columns) 1979
- Een Fries huilt niet, 1980
- De schrijver, zijn schaamte en zijn spiegels, (essay) 1981
- De man achter het raam, 1982
- Het vrije vers, (essays) 1982
- Scheve levens, 1983
- De schriftelijke natuur, (essays) 1985
- Maurits en de feiten, 1986
- Bijna voorjaar, (columns) 1986
- De weg naar Tuktoyaktuk, 1987
- De schoonheid van de witregel, (essays) 1987
- Helmholtz' paradijs, (essays) 1987
- Een ongenode gast, 1988
- De Hagemeijertjes, 1990
- Voor wie kwaad wil, (essay) 1990
- Wat mooi is moeilijk, (essays) 1991
- Oude foto's, (short stories) 1992
- Wat mooi is is moeilijk, (essays) 1992
- Omhelzingen, 1993
- Okoka's Wonderpark, 1994
- De mechanica van het liegen, (essays) 1995
- Middleton's dood, 1996
- De kleur van Groningen, (poetry) 1997
- 60000 uur, (autobiography) 1998
- Missie Novgorod, 1999
- De vitalist, 2000
- Geen man, want geen vrouw, (poetry) 2001
- Minnaar, (poetry) 2001
- 'n Kleintje Krol, 2001
- Een schaaknovelle, 2002
- Rondo Veneziano, 2004
- Duivelskermis, 2007
- De industrie geneest alle leed (verzamelde gedichten, 2009)
- Verplaatste personen (verhalen, schilderijen Otto Krol, 2009)
