= A. L. Snijders =

Dutch writer (1937–2021)

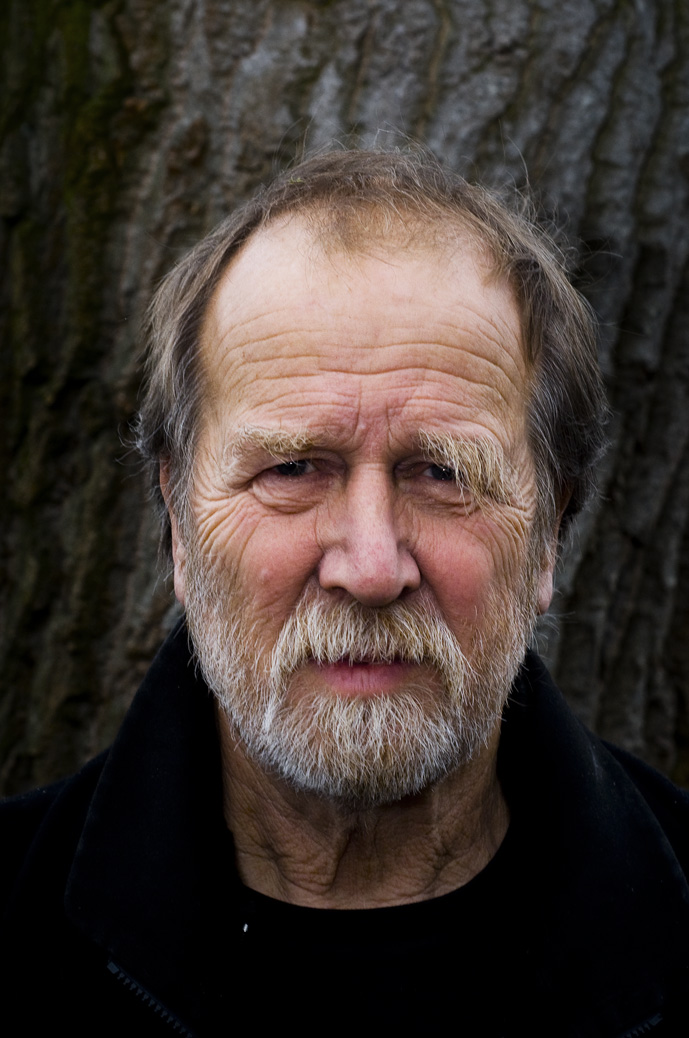
- Born: Peter Cornelis Müller; 24 September 1937; Amsterdam, Netherlands
- Died: 7 June 2021 (aged 83); Klein Dochteren, Netherlands
- Awards: Constantijn Huygens Prize

A. L. Snijders, born Peter Cornelis Müller (24 September 1937 – 7 June 2021), was a Dutch writer renowned for his characteristic short-form fiction, which he called zkvs, an abbreviation of zeer korte verhalen, or very short stories. He wrote thousands of short stories, many of which remain untranslated into English.

Snijders received numerous accolades for his work, including the Constantijn Huygens Prize. Some of Snijders' zkvs have been translated into English by Lydia Davis in Night Train, published in 2021, shortly after Snijders's death.
