= Constantijn Huygens Prize =

Dutch literary award

Constantijn Huygens Prize (Dutch: Constantijn Huygensprijs)
- Awarded for: Literature
- Country: Netherlands
- Presented by: Jan Campert Foundation (Dutch: Jan Campert-Stichting)
- First award: 1947
- Website: https://literatuurmuseum.nl/literatuurprijzen/constantijn-huygens-prijs

The Constantijn Huygens Prize (Dutch: Constantijn Huygens-prijs) is a Dutch literary award.

== History ==
Since 1947, it has been awarded each year for an author's complete works by the Jan Campert Foundation (Dutch: Jan Campert-Stichting), a foundation named in honor of the Dutch writer Jan Campert who died while helping Jews during World War II. The award is named after Constantijn Huygens, a 17th-century Dutch poet, diplomat, scholar and composer.

As of 2019 it comes with a monetary award of €12,000.

There was no prize awarded in 1968. In 1982, Jan Wolkers refused to accept the award.

== List of laureates ==
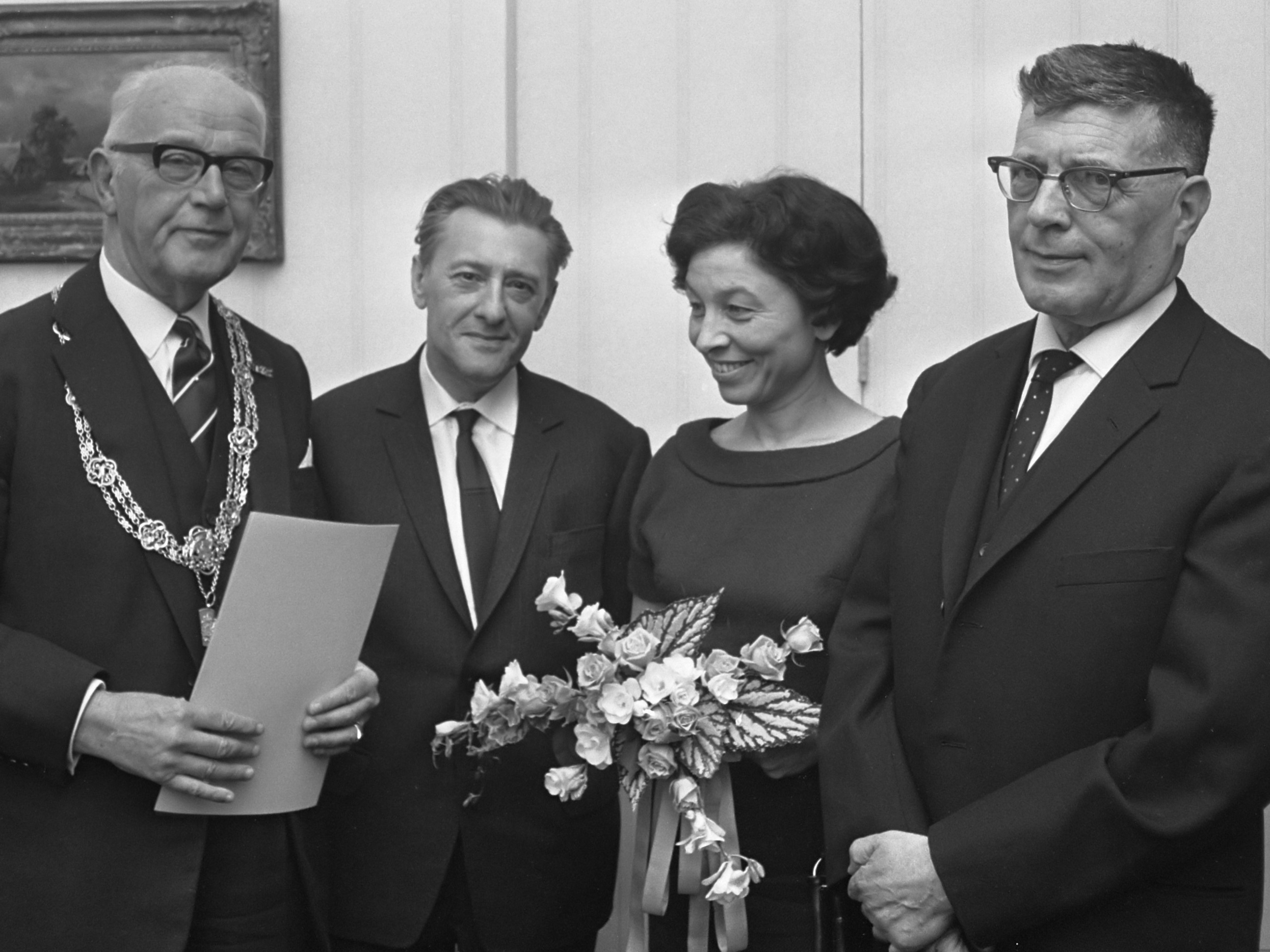
Louis Paul Boon (1966)

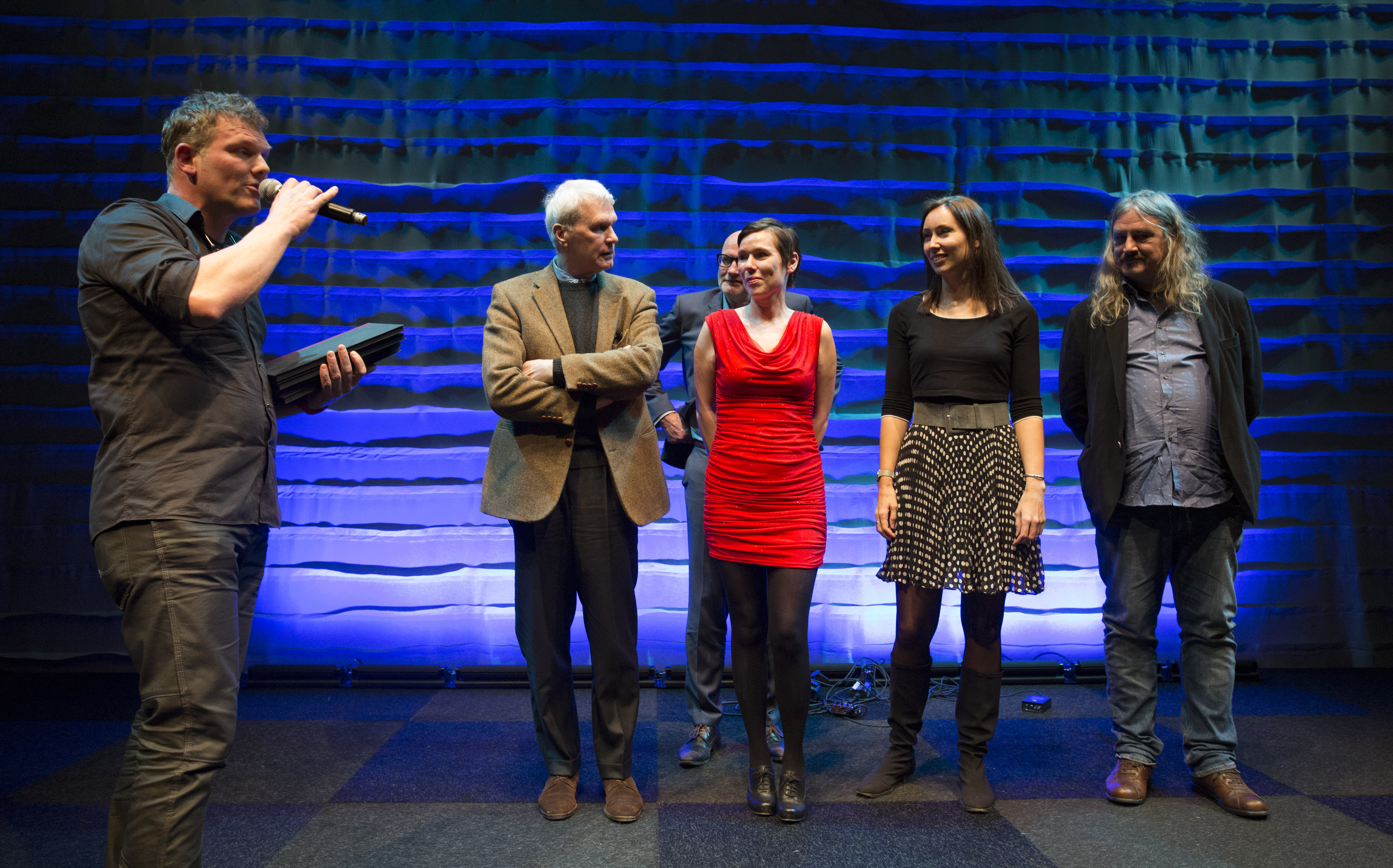
Adriaan van Dis (Constantijn Huygens Prize 2015)

- 1947 – P.N. van Eyck
- 1948 – Adriaan Roland Holst
- 1949 – J.C. Bloem
- 1950 – Geerten Gossaert
- 1951 – Willem Elsschot
- 1952 – Pierre H. Dubois
- 1953 – Martinus Nijhoff (posthumously awarded)
- 1954 – Jan Engelman
- 1955 – Simon Vestdijk
- 1956 – Pierre Kemp
- 1957 – Ferdinand Bordewijk
- 1958 – Victor E. van Vriesland
- 1959 – Gerrit Achterberg
- 1960 – Anton van Duinkerken
- 1961 – Simon Carmiggelt
- 1962 – Hendrik de Vries
- 1963 – Jan van Nijlen
- 1964 – Abel Herzberg
- 1965 – Lucebert
- 1966 – Louis Paul Boon
- 1967 – Jan Greshoff
- 1968 – not awarded
- 1969 – Maurice Gilliams
- 1970 – Annie Romein-Verschoor
- 1971 – F.C. Terborgh
- 1972 – Han G. Hoekstra
- 1973 – Beb Vuyk
- 1974 – M. Vasalis
- 1975 – Albert Alberts
- 1976 – Jan G. Elburg
- 1977 – Harry Mulisch
- 1978 – Elisabeth Eybers
- 1979 – Hugo Claus
- 1980 – Alfred Kossmann
- 1981 – Hella S. Haasse
- 1982 – Jan Wolkers (declined)
- 1983 – Rob Nieuwenhuys
- 1984 – J. Bernlef
- 1985 – Pierre H. Dubois
- 1986 – Gerrit Krol
- 1987 – Annie M.G. Schmidt
- 1988 – Jacques Hamelink
- 1989 – Anton Koolhaas
- 1990 – Hans Faverey
- 1991 – Bert Schierbeek
- 1992 – Cees Nooteboom
- 1993 – Jeroen Brouwers
- 1994 – Judith Herzberg
- 1995 – F. Springer
- 1996 – H.C. ten Berge
- 1997 – Leonard Nolens
- 1998 – H.H. ter Balkt
- 1999 – Willem Jan Otten
- 2000 – Charlotte Mutsaers
- 2001 – Louis Ferron
- 2002 – Kees Ouwens
- 2003 – Sybren Polet
- 2004 – Willem G. van Maanen
- 2005 – Marga Minco
- 2006 – Jacq Firmin Vogelaar
- 2007 – Toon Tellegen
- 2008 – Anneke Brassinga
- 2009 – Arnon Grunberg
- 2010 – A.L. Snijders
- 2011 – A. F. Th. van der Heijden
- 2012 – Joke van Leeuwen
- 2013 – Tom Lanoye
- 2014 – Mensje van Keulen
- 2015 – Adriaan van Dis
- 2016 – Atte Jongstra
- 2017 – Hans Tentije
- 2018 – Nelleke Noordervliet
- 2019 – Stefan Hertmans
- 2020 – Guus Kuijer
- 2021 – Peter Verhelst
- 2022 – Marion Bloem
- 2023 - Anjet Daanje
- 2024 - Tomas Lieske
- 2025 - Lieke Marsman
