= Charlotte Mutsaers =

Dutch painter and writer

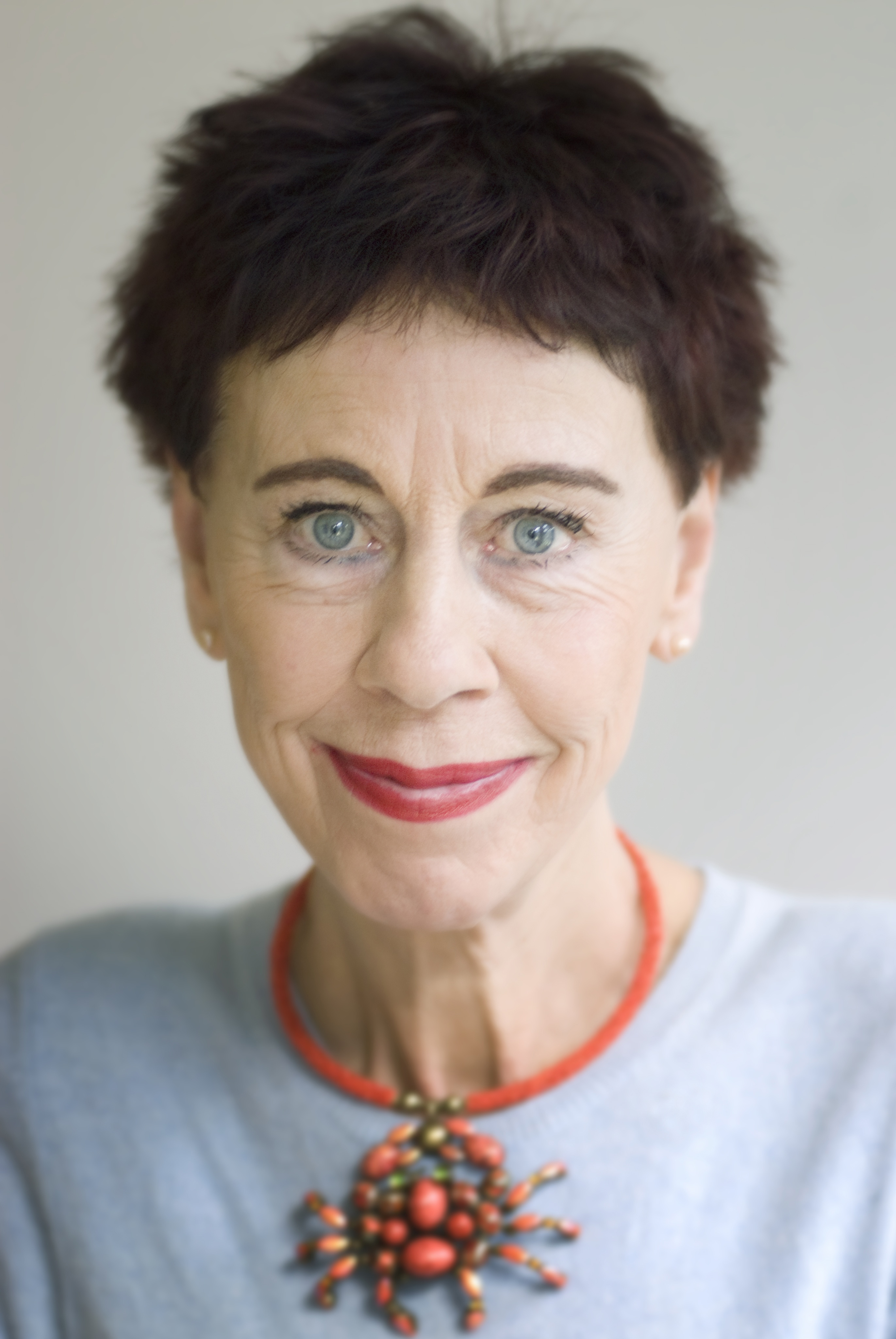
- Charlotte Mutsaers in 2008
- Born: Charlotte Jacoba Maria Mutsaers; 2 November 1942 (age 83); Utrecht, Netherlands
- Education: Gerrit Rietveld Academy
- Occupations: Painter, teacher, essayist, novelist
- Writing career
- Language: Dutch
- Notable awards: Constantijn Huygens Prize (2000); P. C. Hooft Award (2010)
- Website: www.charlottemutsaers.nl

Charlotte Jacoba Maria Mutsaers (Dutch pronunciation: [ɕɑrˈlɔtə jaːˈkoːbaː maːˈrijaː ˈmʏtsaːrs]; born 2 November 1942) is a Dutch painter, prose writer and essayist. She won the Constantijn Huygens Prize (2000) and the P. C. Hooft Award (2010) for her literary oeuvre.

== Biography ==
Charlotte Jacoba Maria Mutsaers was born on 2 November 1942 in the city of Utrecht in the Netherlands. She was the daughter of the art historian Barend Mutsaers who worked at Utrecht University. She attended a gymnasium and studied Dutch in Amsterdam.

Subsequently, she became a teacher at an institute of higher vocational education. In the evenings she studied painting and printmaking at the Gerrit Rietveld Academie in Amsterdam. After her graduation she became a teacher at that institution. She remained an art teacher for over ten years.

As an artist she makes paintings, she has designed stamps, illustrated cultural magazines (Vrij Nederland) and designed book covers.

She had exhibitions of her paintings at Galerie Clement (Amsterdam), in the Frans Hals Museum (Haarlem), the Museum of Modern Art (Arnhem), de Nieuwe Kerk (Amsterdam) and the Museum de Beyerd (Breda).

She started writing when she was about 40 years old. On 2 April 2010 Dutch television broadcast a documentary De wereld van Charlotte Mutsaers (The World of Charlotte Mutsaers), directed by Suzanne Raes. In May 2010 Charlotte Mutsaers received the P.C. Hooft Award.

Mutsaers was married to the Dutch specialist Jan Fontijn (1936-2022). They have no children. They lived alternately in Amsterdam, Ostend and France.

As a candidate politician she was on the list of the Party for Animals at the occasion of the Dutch elections for the House of Representatives in 2006.

== Awards ==
- J. Greshoff Prize (1992) for Kersebloed
- Busken Huet Prize (2000) for Zeepijn
- Jacobus van Looy Prize (2000)
- Constantijn Huygens Prize (2000)
- P. C. Hooft Award (2010)

== Bibliography ==
- (1983) Het circus van de geest (emblems)
- (1985) Hazepeper gevolgd door Napoleon, Sunt pueri pueri... en Varia (essays)
- (1986) Mijnheer Donselaer zoekt een vrouw (picture story)
- (1988) De markiezin (novel)
- (1988) Hanegeschrei (picture story)
- (1990) Kersebloed (essays)
- (1994) Rachels rokje (novel)
- (1996) Paardejam (essays)
- (1999) Zeepijn (short stories)
- (2002) Bont. Uit de zoo van Charlotte Mutsaers (animal stories; illustrated)
- (2003) Cheese! (book & cd)
- (2008) Koetsier Herfst (novel)
- (2010) Pedante pendules en andere wekkers (essays)
- (2012) Dooier op drift (Yoke Afloat) (poetry)
- (2012) Sodom revisited (poetry)
- (2026) Moet dwalen (novel)

== Secondary literature ==
- 2000 – J. Bernlef, T. Hermans et al. Fik & snik. Over Charlotte Mutsaers, schilderes en schrijfster
- 2010 – Daan Cartens (ed.) Charlotte Mutsaers. Paraat met Pen en penseel
