= De kellner en de levenden =

1949 novel by Simon Vestdijk

Cover of 1949 edition

De kellner en de levenden ("The waiter and the living") is a novel from 1949 by Dutch author Simon Vestdijk containing an allegory of the Last Judgment.

== Plot ==
The main characters in this "novel of fantasy" are eleven people who live in the same apartment building and the guest of one of them. The twelve are ordinary, middle-class people (including Protestants, Catholics, and atheists) who appear to be arrested, all at one time, by the police, and loaded onto a bus without any explanation. They drive through a mostly deserted town, seeing occasional groups of people following men with banners, while trumpet music sounds. The twelve are led to a railroad station where they get to wait in a waiting room on one of the platforms. They are entertained by a friendly waiter and informed that this is Judgment Day, and that they are held separate from the other travelers (all those who died after the year 1600) because they haven't died yet. The head waiter of the waiting room is a brutal man called Leenders, but he spends much of his time outside, while inside the waiter serves water from a pitcher which turns into wine the moment it is poured into a glass. The youngest of the company, Wim Kwets, who suffers of consumption, is reunited with his dog, which had died two years before. As the twelve discuss whether the events are real or not, whether they believe in God or not, whether they think that they will indeed be judged or not, they also begin to confess and discuss their sins. All the while souls outside are being led to the trains that will take them to the place of judgment; a special train with the Archangel Michael has already passed.

One of them, a gay actor called Haack, leaves momentarily and discovers that platform 500 is filled with monsters. He is also confronted with his past—in a reenactment of the gravedigger scene from Hamlet, he is given the skull of a young actress who committed suicide because he led her to believe he loved her. When they are finally forced to leave, the monsters from 500 having been unleashed, they end up attending a grotesque parody of Christ in judgment. Leenders, now turned Satan, offers them a quick death if they will renounce God—if they deny, they are to be tortured for eternity. He explains that his armies have taken command and that everything is now Hell, God having been cast out to some remote corner of the universe. They refuse his offer, "whether from fear or real conviction", and escape. They find themselves outside, in the city, and walk home through a landscape full of signs of the apocalypse, still pondering their sins. Back at the apartment building they meet the waiter again, now clearly a Christ figure, who explains that God and existence are vast but imperfect and that humans need to accept themselves in all their imperfections. As he turns to leave he takes the dog with him, but young Wim, the dog's owner, wants to keep the animal; the waiter confers with Haack and in the end takes the dog as well as the boy with him.

== Reception and commentary ==
By the time of its publication, just after World War II, Vestdijk had already acquired the status of "grand old man" of Dutch literature. A contemporary review by critic Adriaan Morriën noted that many of Vestdijk's readers would have been confused or disappointed by the novel, which they could have read as "a dream, a publicity stunt, or a tremendous joke". Turner Cassity, in a review of contemporary Dutch poetry published in Poetry, connects the novel to a poem of Vestdijk's, "The Dead Swans", in which dead and living swans inhabit the same pond: "The presentation of death as merely a form of life with its appetites darkened is chilling. It is the same fantasy which Vestdijk puts forward in his novel De kellner en de levenden". T. W. L. Scheltema, in a review in Books Abroad, called it a "well-balanced narrative", and said, "with this novel the author has achieved a place among the world's significant contemporary authors".
