= Hendrik de Vries =

Dutch poet and painter (1896–1989)

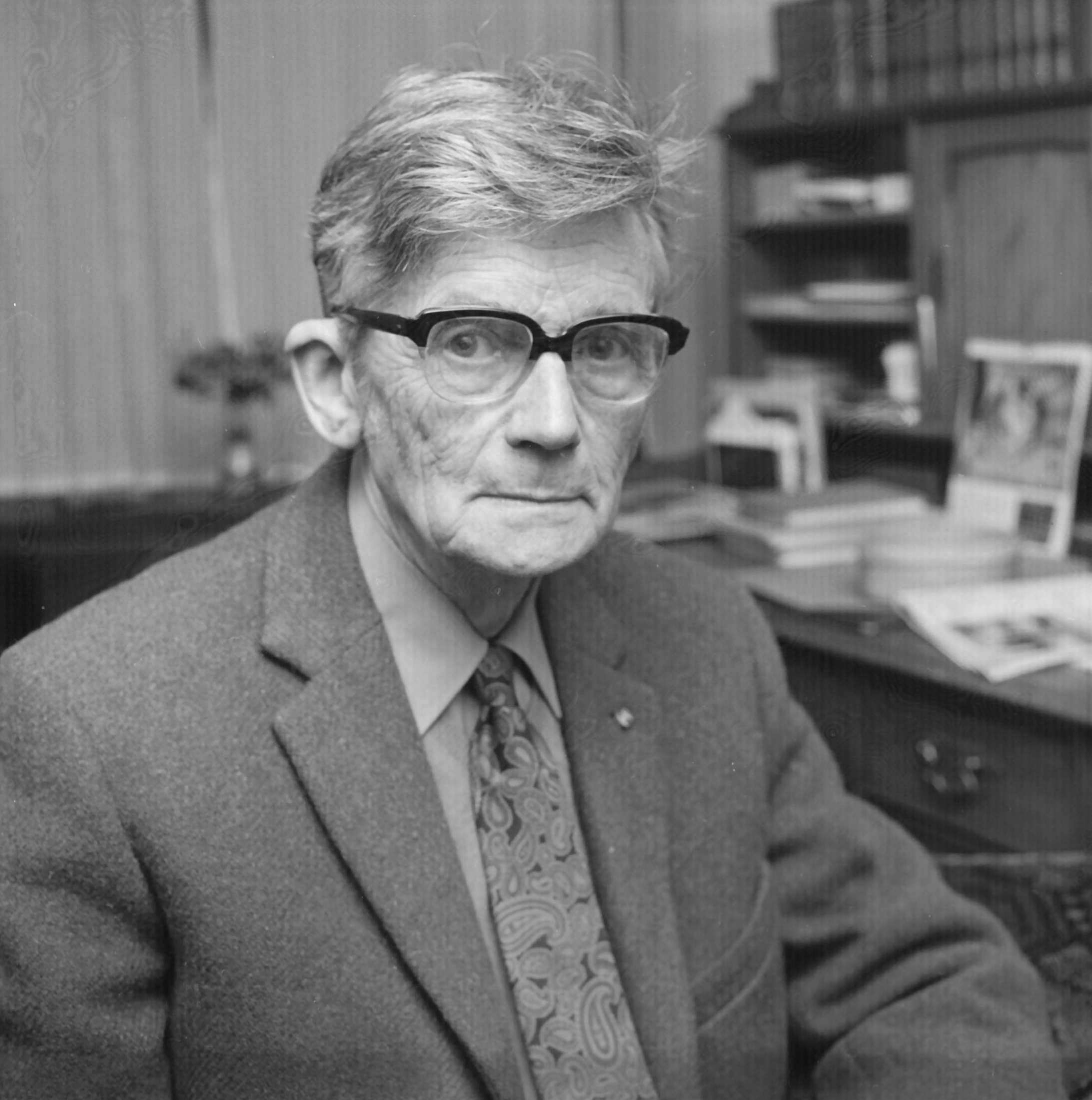
Hendrik de Vries, 1976

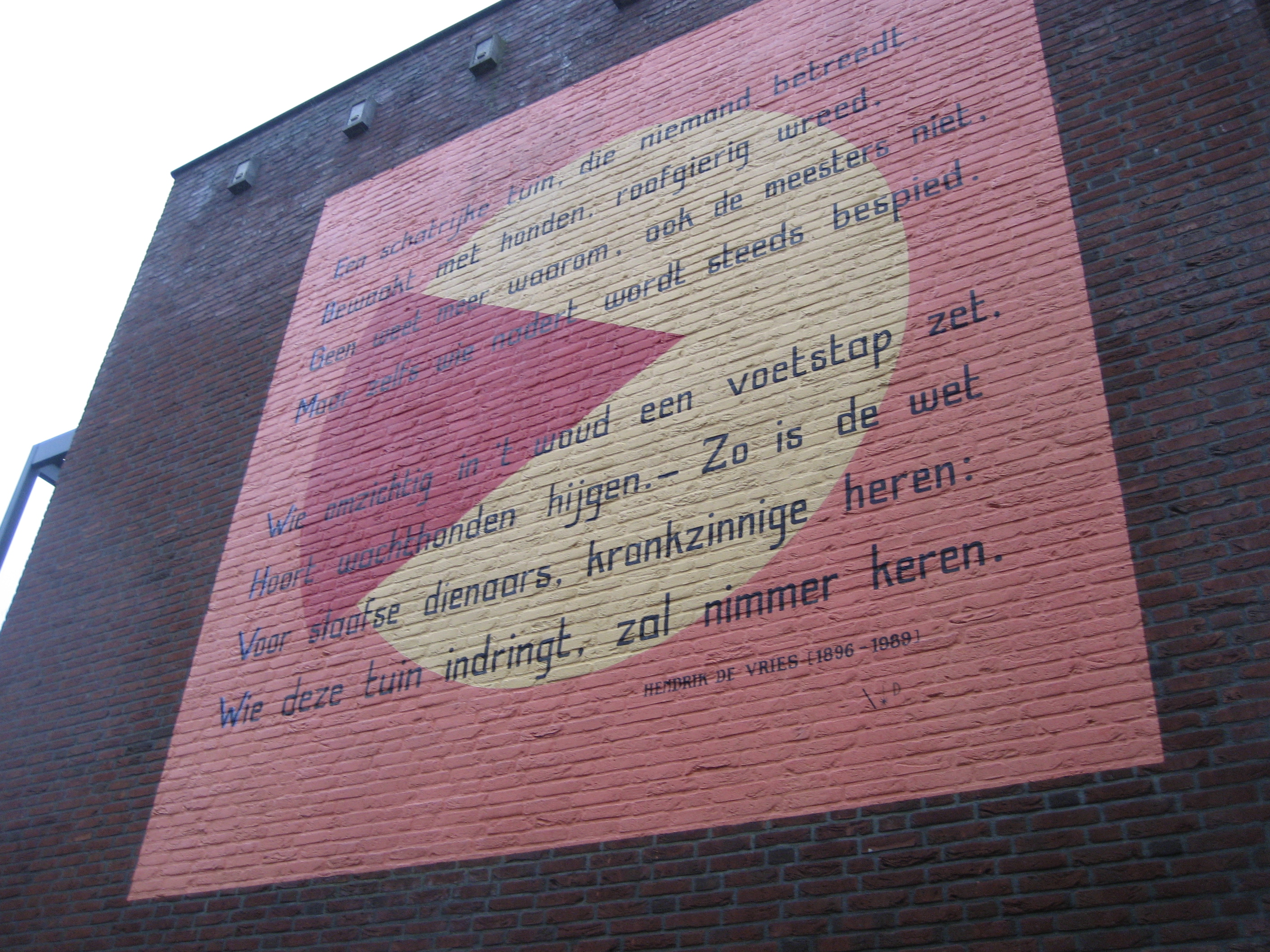
A poem by Hendrik de Vries on a wall in Leiden

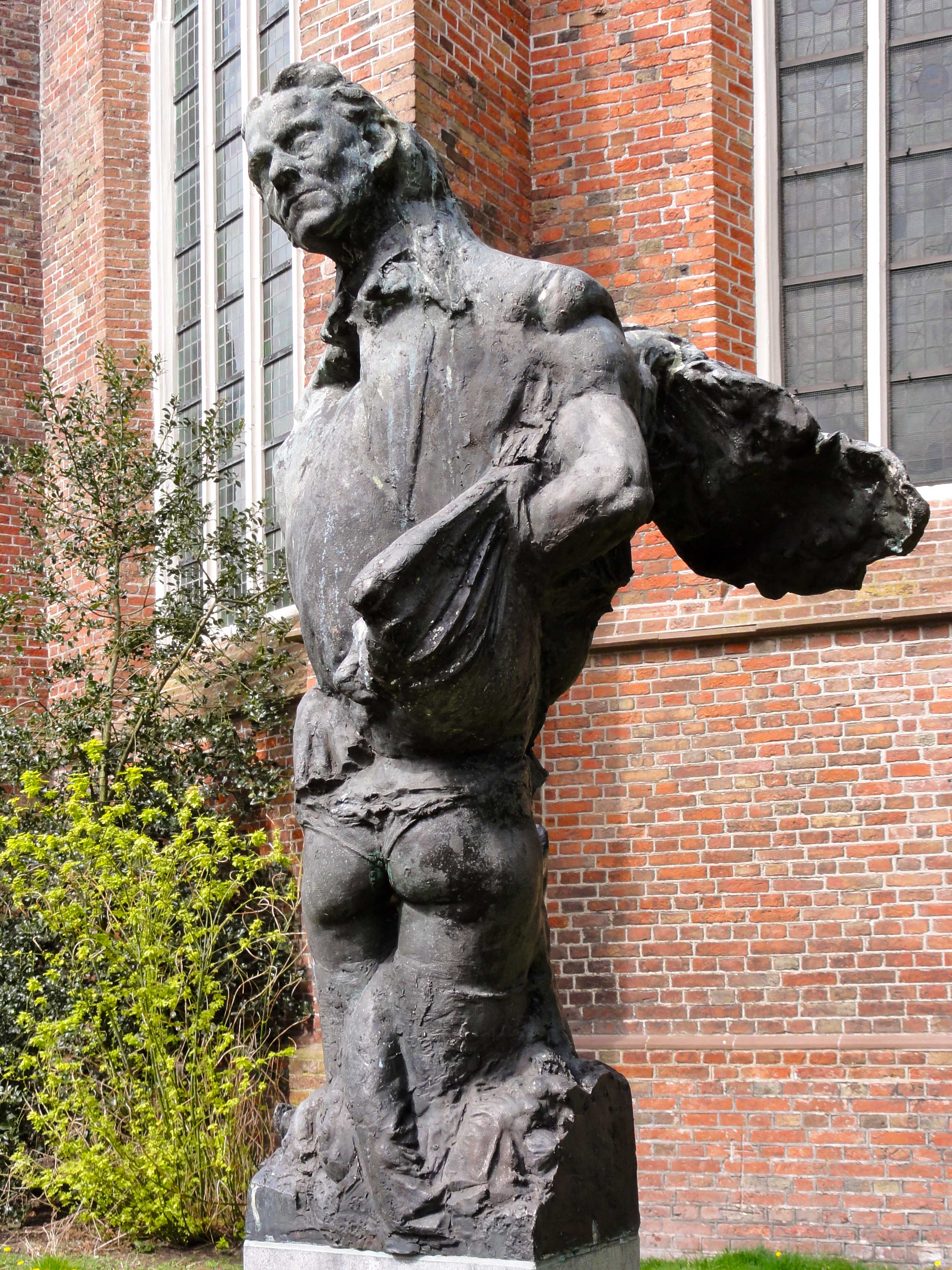
Statue of Hendrik de Vries by Norman Burkett near the Martinikerk in Groningen

Hendrik (Henry) de Vries (17 August 1896 – 18 November 1989) was a significant Dutch poet and painter who was born in Groningen, Netherlands and died in Haren, Netherlands. He was an early surrealist, was liberal-minded, and preached vitality. The subconscious mind plays a crucial role in his poetry.

Much his inspiration came from his interest in Spain and Spanish culture. He visited Spain frequently and became proficient enough to write many poems in Spanish.

De Vries had many collections of his poetry, writings, and artworks published during his lifetime. He also contributed to the literary magazine Het Getij (The Tide).

De Vries' work was included in the 1939 exhibition and sale Onze Kunst van Heden (Our Art of Today) at the Rijksmuseum in Amsterdam.

== Prizes ==
- 1946 – Henrdrik Vriesprijs (Hendrik de Vries Prize)
- 1948 – Lucy B. and C.W. van der Hoogtprijs (Lucy B. and C.W. van der Hoog Prize) for Toovertuin
- 1951 – Special prize from the Jan Campert Foundation for his essay-writing poetry about poetry
- 1956 – Additional prize from Jan Campert Foundation
- 1959 – Cultural prize of the province of Groningen for his entire oeuvre
- 1962 – Constantijn Huygensprijs for his entire oeuvre
- 1973 – P.C. Hooftprijs for his entire oeuvre

== Bibliography ==
- 1917 − Het gat in Mars en het Milagrat (The Hole in Mars and Milagrat)
- 1920 − De nacht (The Night)
- 1920 − Vlamrood (Flame red)
- 1923 − Lofzangen (Praise Songs)
- 1928 − Silenen
- 1931 − Spaansche volksliederen (Spanish Folk songs)
- 1932 − Stormfakkels
- 1935 − Copla's
- 1937 − Atlantische balladen (Atlantic Ballads)
- 1937 − Geïmproviseerd bouquet (Improvised Bouquet)
- 1937 − Nergal
- 1939 − Romantische rhapsodie (Romantic Rhapsody)
- 1944 − Robijnen (clandestien gedrukt) / Ruby (clandestinely printed during WWII)
- 1946 − Capricho's en rijmkritieken
- 1946 − Toovertuin
- 1951 − Distels en aloë's
- 1955 − Gitaarfantasieën (Guitar Fanasties)
- 1958 − Groninger symphonie (Groninger symphony)
- 1965 − Iberia, krans van reisherinneringen
- 1966 − Diseño jondo
- 1971 − Cantos extraviados
- 1971 − Goyescos
- 1978 − Impulsen (Impulses)
- 1993 − Verzamelde gedichten (Collected Poems)
- 1996 − Sprookjes (Storytelling)
