= Lars Holte =

Norwegian trance DJ and producer (born 1966)

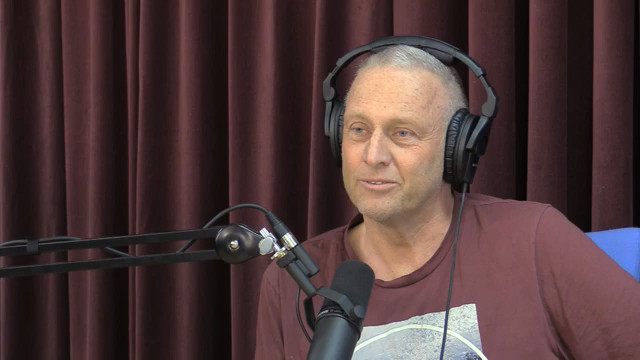
Lars Holte

Lars Petter Holte (born 31 January 1966) is a Norwegian trance DJ and producer. Known under the name DJ Lars Holte he was mostly active during the late 1990s and early 2000s. He was central to the development and growth of the genre through the 1990s and in the 2000s he played on several big events like Hyperstate and SommerParade, and worked closely with Tiësto.

Holte has released three records with mixes of other artists and a small number of songs produced by himself.

== Discography ==
- In Trance We Trust 003 (1999)
- The First Summer (2000)
- Sommer Parade (2001)
