= Kees Ouwens =

Dutch novelist and poet

Cornelis Johannes "Kees" Ouwens (27 June 1944 in Zeist – 24 August 2004 in Heemstede) was a Dutch novelist and poet. He won numerous awards throughout his career, among them the 2002 Constantijn Huygens Prize.
