= Jan Elburg =

Dutch poet

Joannes Gommert Elburg
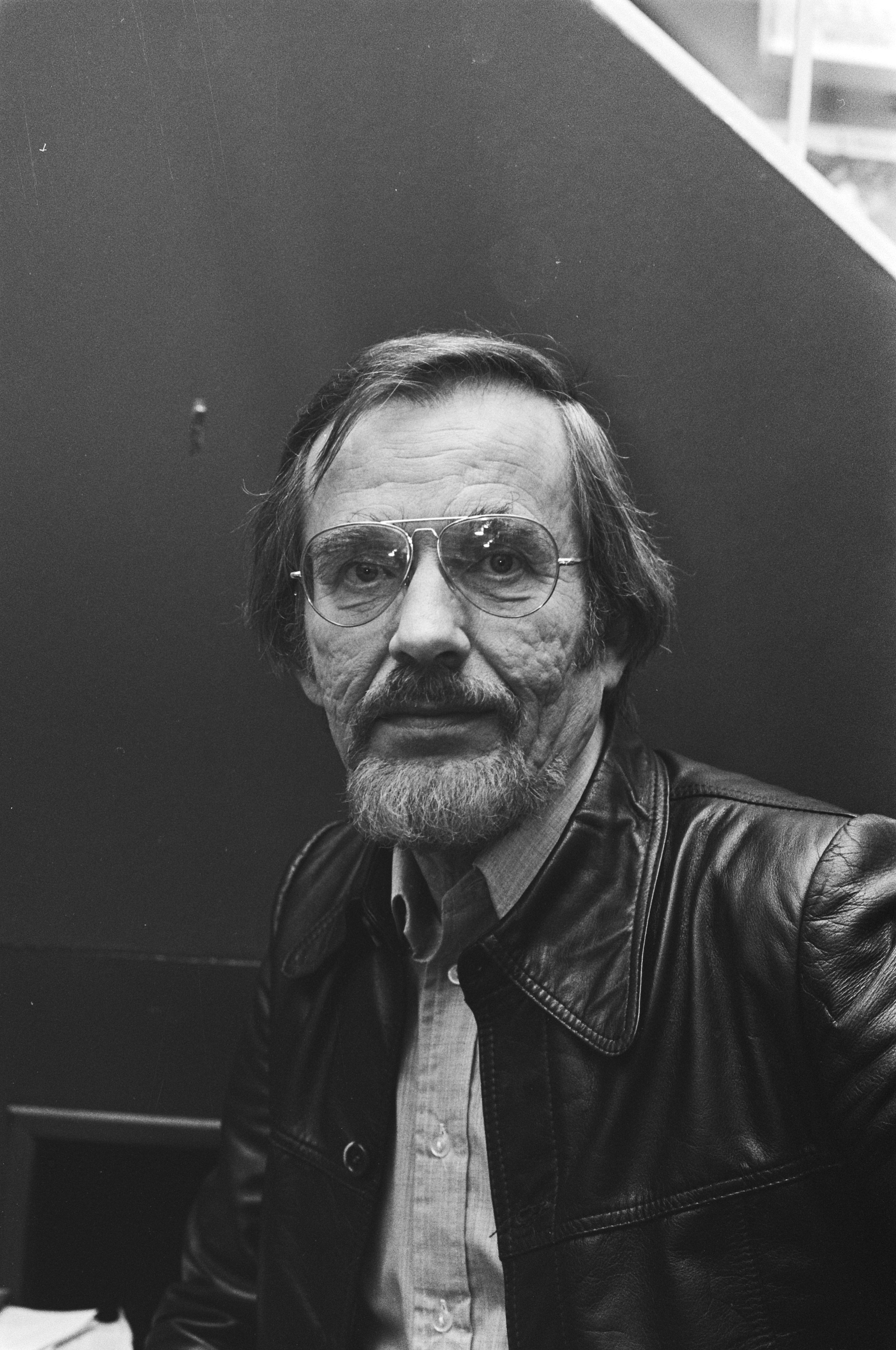
- Elberg in 1976
- Born: 30 November 1919; Wemeldinge, Netherlands
- Died: 13 August 1992 (aged 72); Amsterdam, Netherlands
- Other name: Jan G. Elburg
- Awards: Constanijn Huygens Prize 1976

Joannes Gommert Elburg, writing as Jan G. Elburg (born Wemeldinge, 30 November 1919 – died Amsterdam, 13 August 1992) was a Dutch poet. He won numerous awards throughout his career, among them the 1976 Constantijn Huygens Prize.

== Bibliography ==
- 1943 - Serenade for Lena
- 1944 - The thistle flower
- 1947 - Small terror play
- 1948 - Through the night
- 1952 - Low Tibet
- 1956 - The flag of reality
- 1959 - Have and be
- 1960 - Trident. Poems 1952-1958
- 1960 - Chatting
- 1964 - The thought of my echo
- 1965 - Streak through the bill
- 1971 - The quark and the big smurf
- 1975 - Poems 1950-1975
- 1981 - Potter's frogs
- 1982 - Anything from that
- 1986 - Earlier comes later
- 1987 - No lords
- 1988 - At odds with the excuse
- 1988 - It seems like winter
- 2004 - The parable of the manatee
- 2005 - Not for chefs, but for the guests
- 2006 - The Zevenaar (Poetry experiments 1941-1950)
