= Victor E. van Vriesland =

Dutch Jewish writer and critic (1892–1974)

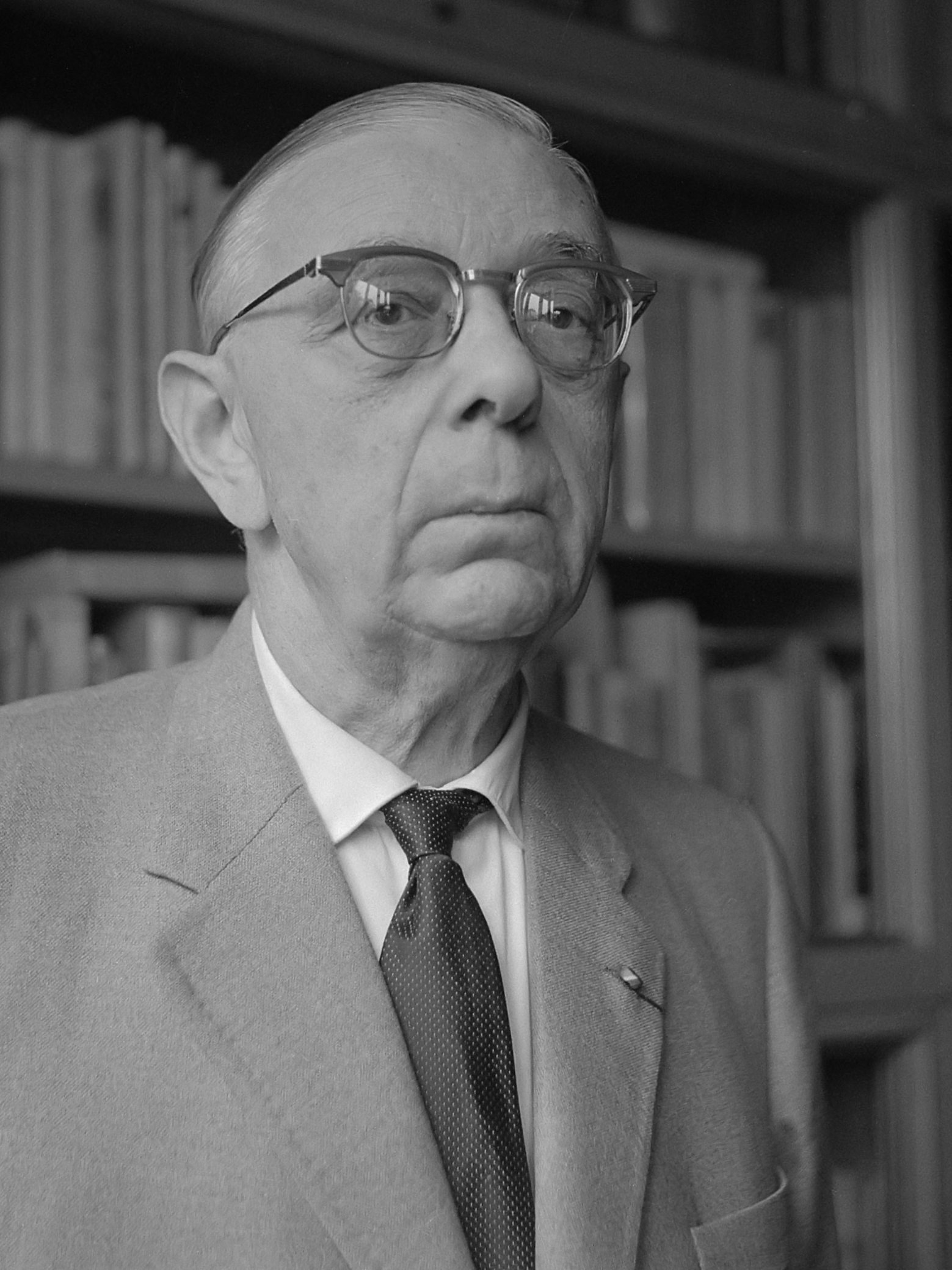
Victor van Vriesland (1962)

Victor Emanuel van Vriesland (27 October 1892, Haarlem – 29 October 1974, Amsterdam) was a Dutch Jewish writer and critic.

== Biography ==
He studied at the gymnasium in The Hague and then at the University of Dijon. He was literary and artistic journalist, editor of a weekly magazine. He received the Constantijn Huygens Prize in 1958 and the P. C. Hooft Award in 1960. He was the president of the Dutch Pen Club. From 1962 to 1965, van Vriesland was President of PEN International, the worldwide association of writers. Van Vriesland writes as easily in French as in his native language and likes even the refinement of sintaxe and prosody: Te souviendra t-il de mon nom, de ma tendresse? - Le vent qui bat ma fenetre sans cesse L'effacera.

== Bibliography ==
- 1915 - De cultureele noodtoestand van het Joodsche volk
- 1920 - Herman Hana
- 1925 - Der verlorene Sohn (in German)
- 1926 - Het afscheid van de wereld in drie dagen (published in 1953)
- 1929 - Voorwaardelijk uitzicht
- 1933 - Havenstad
- 1935 - Herhalingsoefeningen
- 1939 - De ring met de aquamarijn
- 1939-1954 - Spiegel der Nederlandse poëzie
- 1946 - Vooronderzoek
- 1946 - Grondslag van verstandhouding (published in 1947)
- 1949 - Drievoudig verweer
- 1949 - Le vent se couche (in French)
- 1952 - Vereenvoudigingen
- 1954 - De onverzoenlijken
- 1954 - Kortschrift
- 1958 - Onderzoek en vertoog
- 1959 - Tegengif
- 1962 - Het werkelijkheidsgehalte in de West-Europese literatuur
- 1968 - Verzamelde gedichten
- 1972 - Bijbedoelingen

Non-profit organization positions
Preceded by Alberto Moravia	International President of PEN International; 1962–1965	Succeeded by Arthur Miller
