= Amoene van Haersolte =

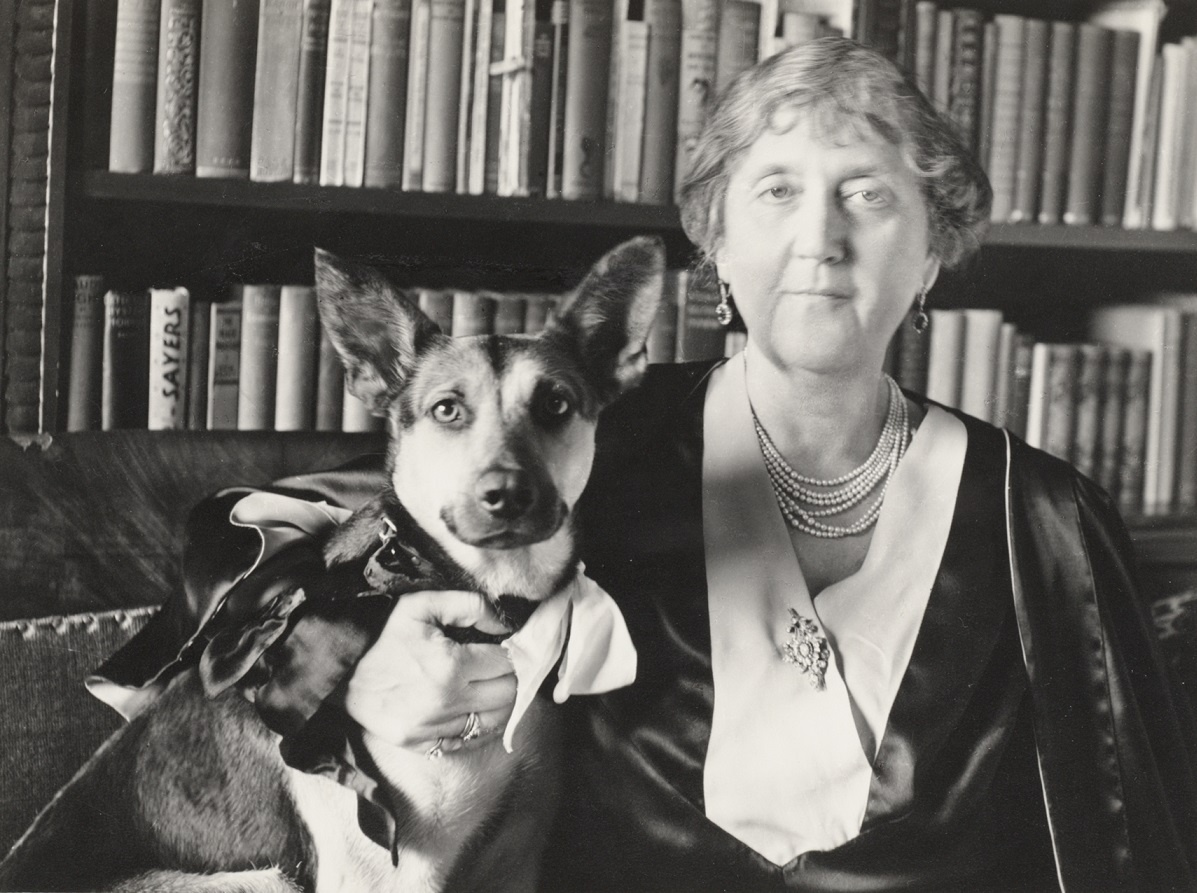
Amoene van Haersolte (1930s)

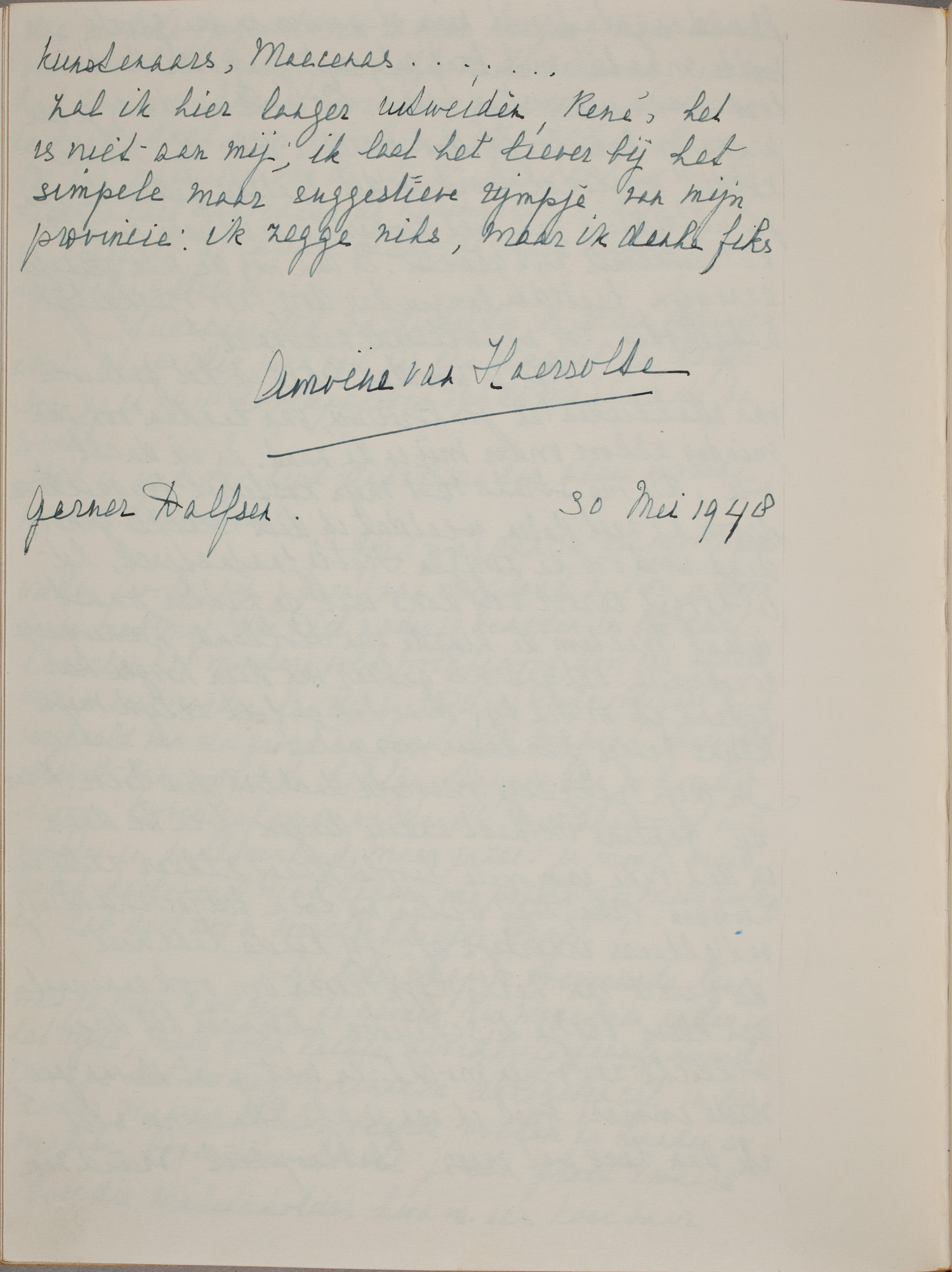
Handwriting and signature of Amoëne van Haersolte, May 30, 1948

Jkvr. Amoëne van Haersolte (born Ernestine Amoene Sophia van Holthe tot Echten; 23 February 1890 – 11 August 1952) was a Dutch writer of prose.

Van Haersolte was born in Utrecht. She won the first P. C. Hooft Award in 1947. She died, aged 62, in Dalfsen.

== Bibliography ==
=== Novels ===
- 1949 - De komeet en het harlekijntje
- 1951 - Lucile
- 1953 - De roerkop

=== Novellas ===
- 1927 - De laatsten
- 1946 - Sophia in de Koestraat
- 1953 - De roerkop
