= Albert Alberts =

Dutch writer, translator and journalist

- Born: 23 August 1911; Haarlem, Dutch
- Died: 16 December 1995 (aged 84); Amsterdam, Dutch
- Education: Utrecht University
- Occupations: writer, translator, journalist
- Writing career
- Pen name: A. Alberts

Albert Alberts, writing as A. Alberts (1911–1995) was a Dutch writer, translator, and journalist. He won numerous awards throughout his career, among them the 1975 Constantijn Huygens Prize.

== Life and work ==
A. Alberts was born on 23 August 1911 in Haarlem. He studied Indology at Utrecht University. There, he formed a circle of friends with Anton Koolhaas and Leo Vroman, who also became prominent writers. After his graduation (1936), he worked for several years as a civil servant for the Ministère des Colonies (Ministry of the Colonies) in Paris. In 1939, he received his doctorate in literature and philosophy with a thesis about the conflict from 1847 to 1851 between Jean Chrétien Baud and Johan Rudolf Thorbecke, two Dutch politicians (respectively, a colonial governor turned Conservative parliamentarian and a major Liberal reformer).

He subsequently served as a colonial administrator in the Dutch East Indies. After the Battle of Java (1942) he was interned by the Japanese on Java from April 1942 to September 1945. During his internment, he came into contact with the writer Han Friedericy. In 1946, he returned to the Netherlands and worked briefly at the Ministry of Overseas Territories, with Friedericy as his direct superior. He then served as executive secretary of the Kina Bureau for the trade in quinine products in Amsterdam until 1953.

Alberts was a political editor for De Groene Amsterdammer from 1953 to 1965. His last employer was the Ministry of Foreign Affairs, where he retired in 1976.

In 1953 he published his first book, De eilanden (The islands) - a collection of short stories inspired by his experiences in the Dutch East Indies. A year later, he published the short novel De bomen (De bomen). Other works include De Vergaderzaal (The conference room), De honden jagen niet meer (The hounds no longer hunt), De Zilveren Kogel (The Silver Bullet - life and demise of John Graham of Claverhouse), De Utrechtse herinneringen van A. Alberts (An Utrecht Memoir by A. Alberts), and De vrouw met de parasol (The woman with the sunshade). He also produced translations, including of Diderot’s La Religieuse: De non, 1968

His Collected Works were published in 2005, in three volumes, counting over 2000 pages.

Albert Alberts died in Amsterdam on 16 December 1995.

== Works ==
=== Fiction ===
- 1953 De eilanden (The islands)
- 1954 De bomen (The trees)
- 1974 De vergaderzaal (The conference room), 4th edition 1978
- 1976 Haast hebben in September (To hurry in September)
- 1979 De honden jagen niet meer (The dogs are hunting no longer)
- 1981 Maar geel en glanzend blijft het goud (But yellow and shiny the gold remains)
- 1982 Het zand voor de kust van Aveiro (The sand at the coast of Aveiro)
- 1984 De zilveren kogel (The silver bullet - the rise and demise of John Graham of Claverhouse)
- 1987 Een venster op het Buitenhof (A window on the Buitenhof)
- 1991 De vrouw met de parasol (The woman with the sunshade)
- 1992 Libretto voor een gewezen koningin - Een keuze uit eigen werk (Libretto for a former queen - a selection from own works)
- 2005 Verzameld Werk (Collected works), Part 1: Romans en Verhalen (Novels and Stories), Part 2: Historische Vertellingen en verspreid werk (Historical and assorted non-fiction), Part 3: Memoires en beschouwingen (Memoirs and essays)

=== Non-Fiction ===
- 1938 Baud and Thorbecke 1847-1851 - dissertation
- 1962 Namen noemen (Naming names) - memoir
- 1963 De Franse slag (The French way) or Aan Frankrijk uitgeleverd (Extradited to France) - memoir
- 1963 Wilhelmina, Koningin der Nederlanden (Wilhelmina, Queen of the Netherlands) - essay
- 1964 Koning Willem II - essay
- 1964 Koning Willem III - essay
- 1965 Johan Rudolf Thorbecke - essay
- 1967 Laten we vrede sluiten (Let's make peace) - essay
- 1968 Het einde van een verhouding (The end of a relationship) - essay
- 1973 De huzaren van Castricum - Een geschiedenis van de Nederlandse Republiek 1780-1800 (The hussars of Castricum - A history of the Dutch Republic 1780-1800) (see Jean Antoine de Collaert#Batavian Republic: 1795–1805) - essay
- 1973 Leven op de rand - Uit de geschiedenis van Apeldoorn (Living on the edge - from the history of Apeldoorn) - essay
- 1975 De Hollanders komen ons vermoorden - De scheiding tussen Noord- en Zuid-Nederland 1585-1648(The Hollanders are coming, to assassinate us - The separation between North and South Netherlands 1548-1648) - essay
- 1976 Een koning die van geen née wil horen - De Europese ambities van Lodewijk XIV 1638-1715 (A king who will not take no for an answer - - The European Ambitions of Louis XIV) - essay
- 1979 Per mailboot naar de Oost (By mail boat to the East) - essay
- 1983 De Utrechtse herinneringen van A. Alberts (A. Alberts' Utrecht memoir)
- 1986 Inleiding tot de kennis van de ambtenaar (Introduction to the knowledge of the civil servants) - essay
- 1989 Een kolonie is ook maar een mens (A colony is only a person) - essay, memoir
- 1990 Op weg naar het zoveelste Reich (On the way to the nth Reich) - essay
- 1992 Twee jaargetijden minder (Two seasons fewer) - essay, memoir

=== Films ===
- 1977 De vergaderzaal (The conference room) director: Kees van Iersel
- 2008 The Swamp (based on A. Alberts story Het moeras) director: BarBara Hanlo

== Honors ==
- 1953 Prosa-Award from Amsterdam
- 1973 Marianne Philips Prize
- 1975 Constantijn-Huygens-Preis
- 1994 Silver Medal of the Utrecht University
- 1995 P.C. Hooft-prijs
