= Cornelis Verhoeven =

Dutch philosopher and writer

Official website

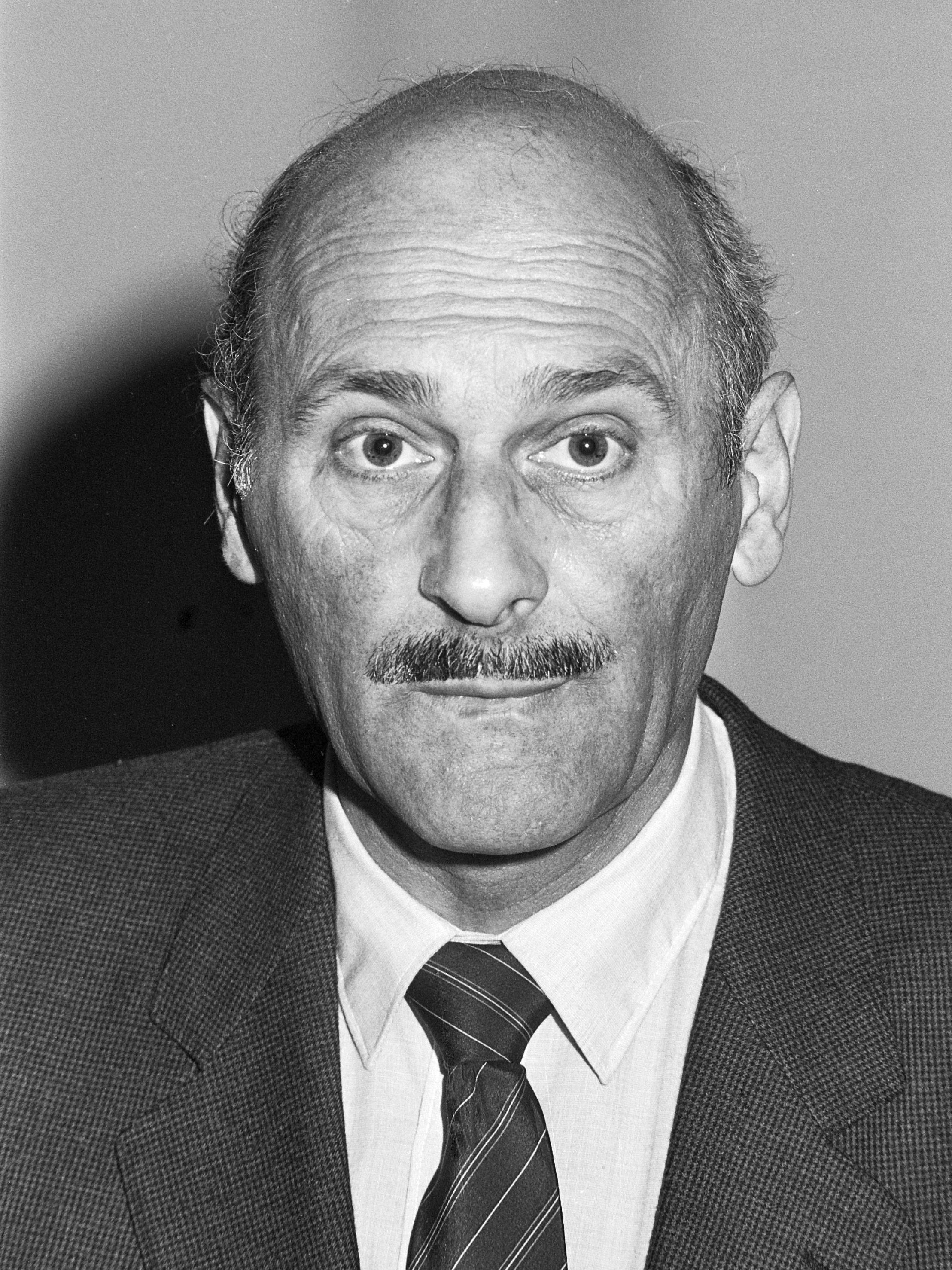
Cornelis Verhoeven (1982)

Cornelis Verhoeven (2 February 1928 – 11 June 2001) was a Dutch philosopher and writer.

== Early life and education ==
Verhoeven was born in Udenhout, the fourth child of seven from a farmer's family in the south of the Netherlands. He attended a catholic priest seminary but was asked to leave. He then studied classics, philosophy and religious studies at the University of Nijmegen and earned his Ph.D. with the thesis Symboliek van de voet on 19 October 1956.

== Career ==
Verhoeven taught Latin and Greek at the Jeroen Bosch College for 27 years. Then he became a professor of philosophy at the University of Amsterdam. He published more than 80 books. He has written original work on wonder, reality, violence, religion, contemplation and language, and interpretations and translations of classical and modern philosophers such as Heraclitus, Plato, Geulincx, Leibniz, Nietzsche and Heidegger. His work has been translated into English, German and Italian, and has been awarded the Anne Frank prize and the P. C. Hooft prize.

One of his best known books was The Philosophy of Wonder.

== Personal ==
Verhoeven had two children, Neeltje (1973) and Daan, a freediver and photographer (1974). He died in Den Bosch, on 11 June 2001.

== Selected publications ==
- Cornelis Verhoeven: The philosophy of wonder. Transl. by Mary Foran. New York, MacMillan, 1972. No ISBN

Verhoeven's full bibliography consists of more than 3700 titles in Dutch.

- De mythe van het schrijverschap (z.j.)
- Symboliek van de voet (1956)
- Symboliek van de sluier (1961)
- Rondom de leegte (1965)
- Het grote gebeuren (1966)
- Inleiding tot de verwondering (1967)
- Omzien naar het heden (1968)
- Voor eigen gebruik (1969)
- Bijna niets (1970)
- Het leedwezen (1971)
- Zakelijkheid en ethiek (1971)
- Het gewicht van de buitenstaander (1972)
- Het axioma van Geulincx (1973)
- Parafilosofen (1974)
- De resten van het vaderschap (1975)
- Een vogeltje in mijn buik. De taal van Nena (1976)
- Boven de boomgrens (1977)
- Een verleden als bezit (1977)
- Herinneringen aan mijn moedertaal (1978)
- De schaduw van één haar (1979)
- De omweg van het woord (1980)
- Tractaat over het spieken (1980)
- Merg en been (1981)
- Een filosofie van het enthousiasme (1982)
- Lof van de mikrologie (1982)
- Weerloos denken (1982)
- De duivelsvraag (1983)
- Mensen in een grot (1983)
- Zonder een zucht (1983)
- Voorbij het begin (1984-1985)
- Het moment (1985)
- De letter als beeld (1987)
- Eerstelingen (1988)
- Het medium van de waarheid (1988)
- Sporen achterlaten (1988)
- Stil staan bij het water; Aforismen; De twijfelachtige symboliek van de brug (1988)
- Een velijnen blad (1989)
- Het besef (1991)
- Alleen maar kijken (1992)
- Een oog in de mist (1993)
- Een register (1995)
- Het geheugen herdacht (1995)
- De duur van de actualiteit (1996)
- De glans van oud ijzer (1996)
- Het dat, het wat en het waarom (1996)
- 'Vergeet de zweep niet' (1997)
- Hetzelfde anders (1997)
- Leibniz, filosoof van de zevende dag (1997)
- Een inleiding in de filosofie (1998)
- Het alziend oog (1999)
- Zijn en staan (1999)
- De ogen van Plato (2000)
- Een cultuur van het geweld (2000)
- Iets nieuws (2000)
- Twaalf confidenties (2001)
