= Simon Vestdijk =

Dutch author (1898–1971)

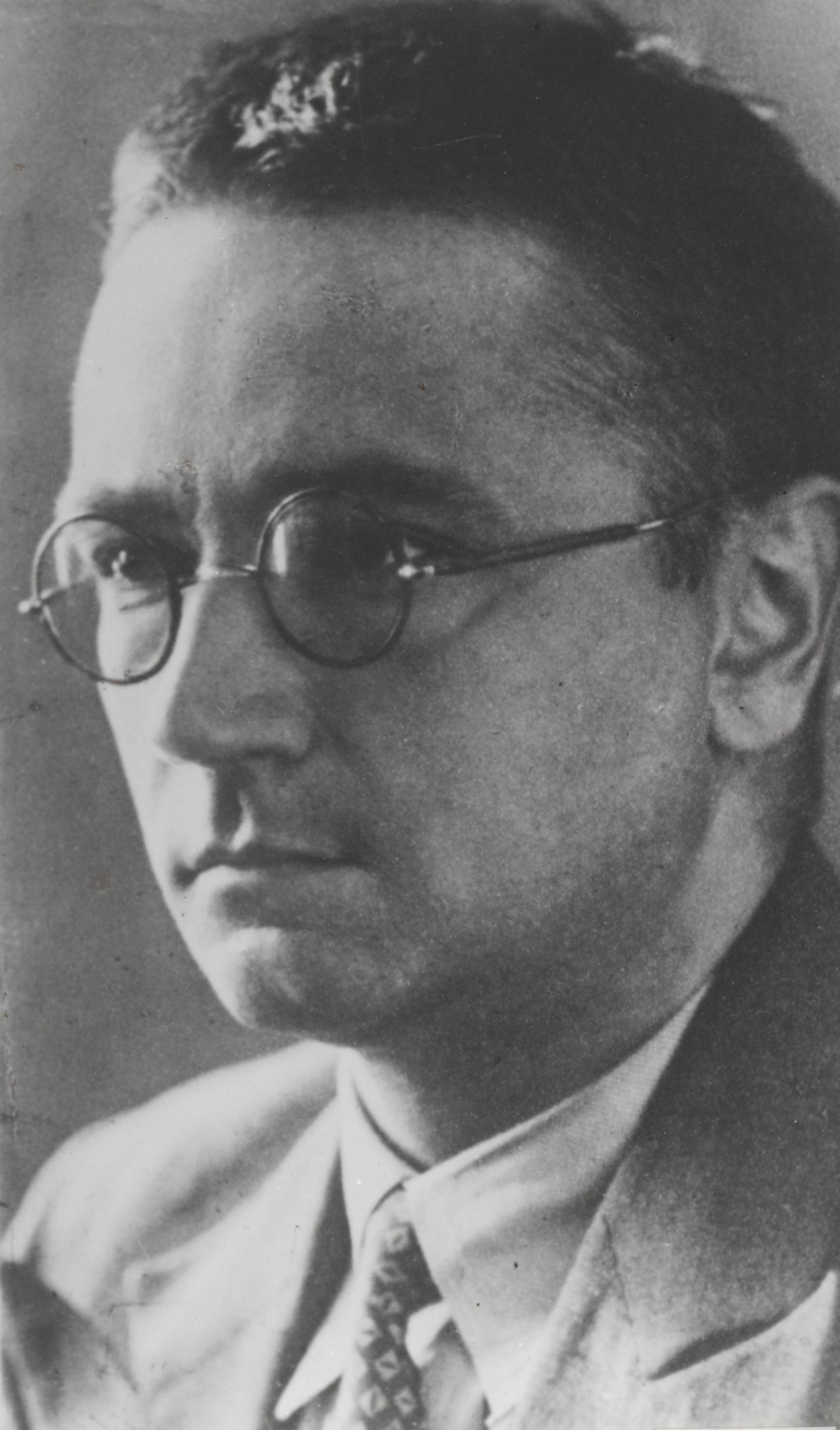
- Born: 17 October 1898; Harlingen, Netherlands
- Died: 23 March 1971 (aged 72); Utrecht, Netherlands
- Occupations: Novelist; essayist; poet; translator
- Writing career
- Period: 1930–1971
- Genres: Historical novel; psychological novel
- Notable works: Back to Ina Damman; Anton Wachter Cycle (8 novels, 1934–1960); The Garden Where the Brass Band Played; De kellner en de levenden
- Notable awards: Constantijn Huygens Prize (1955)
- Literary movement: Modernism

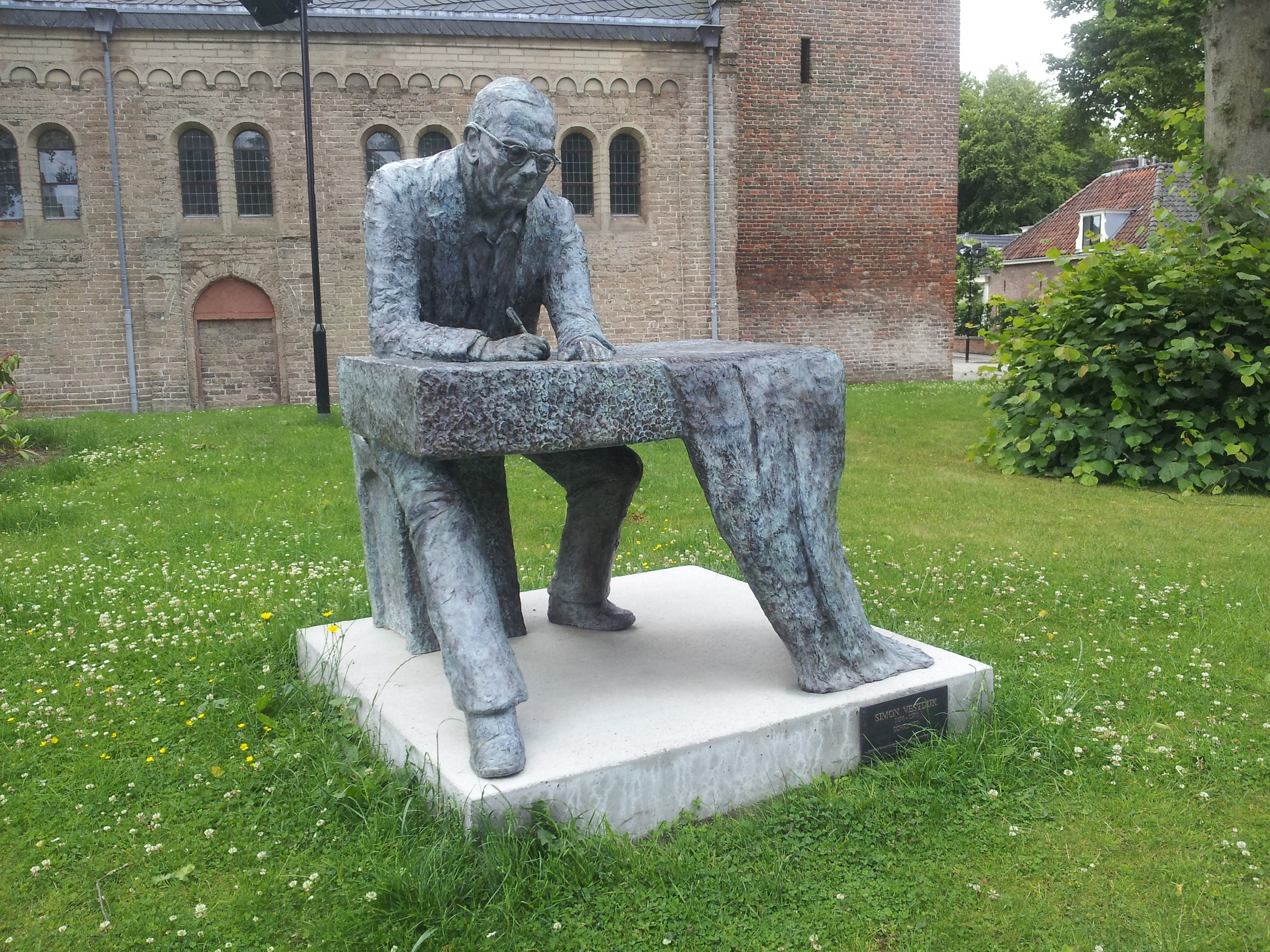
Statue of Simon Vestdijk in Doorn. Sculptor: Jaap te Kiefte.

Simon Vestdijk (Dutch pronunciation: [ˈsimɔɱ ˈvɛzdɛik]; 17 October 1898 – 23 March 1971) was a Dutch writer.

He was nominated for the Nobel Prize in Literature fifteen times.

== Life ==
Born in the small Frisian town of Harlingen, Vestdijk studied medicine in Amsterdam, but turned to literature after a few years as a doctor, including some time on board a ship. From 1932, he lived from literature. He became one of the most important 20th-century writers in the Netherlands. During the German occupation, he and other Dutch intellectuals were held hostage in Kamp Sint-Michielsgestel for some time, partly because they did not want to join the Chamber of Culture. After the war, he retired to Doorn (Utrecht province).

Vestdijk struggled with severe depressions from his youth, and until the end of his life.

His prolificness as a novelist was legendary (poet Adriaan Roland Holst saying of him that "he writes quicker than God can read"), but he was at least as important as an essayist on e.g., literature, religion, art, and music in particular. He also wrote much poetry and short stories. His work has been translated into several European languages. Some of his novels appeared as films in the cinema, or were broadcast on television.

== Bibliography (books in English) ==
- Simon Vestdijk: On the poet Emily Dickinson. Transl. by Peter Twydell. Doorn, Mycenta Vitilis, 2002. ISBN 90-75663-37-4 (Orig. publ. in 1933)
- Simon Vestdijk: The future of religion. Transl. by Jacob Faber. Ann Arbor, Michigan, U.M.I., out of print Books on Demand, 1989. (translation of De toekomst der religie, orig. publ. in 1947)
- Simon Vestdijk: Back to Ina Damman radio-play adaptation of the novel by Simon Vestdijk; adaptation: Marc Lohmann. (Transl. of an adaptation of the novel Terug tot Ina Damman. Hilversum, Nederlandse Omroep Stichting, 1988. No ISBN
- S. Vestdijk: The garden where the brass band played. Translation by A. Brotherton of the novel De koperen tuin, with an introduction by Hella S. Haasse. London, Quartet Books, 1992. ISBN 0-7043-0173-3. Other editions: New York, New Amsterdam, 1989. ISBN 0-941533-59-X; Leyden/London/New York, 1965. No ISBN
- Emily Dickinson: Gedichten. Transl. by S. Vestdijk. Den Haag, Bert Bakker, 1969.
- Emily Dickinson: Selected poems. (Chosen by Simon Vestdijk). Amsterdam, Balkema, 1940 (=1944)
- Simon Vestdijk: Rum Island, Transl. by B.K. Bowes of the novel Rumeiland. London, John Calder, 1963
- Simon Vestdijk : My brown friend & Miodrag Bulatović : Lovers & Keith Johnstone: The return & Robert Pinget: La manivelle. The old tune (English adapt. by Samuel Beckett). London, Calder, 1962

== See also ==
- Het spook en de schaduw ('The Ghost and the Shadow') – Dutch-language novel by Vestdijk
