= Oost-Azië =

Collection of poems by J. Slauerhoff

- Author: J. Slauerhoff
- Language: Dutch
- Genre: Poetry
- Publisher: De Gemeenschap (first ed.)
- Publication date: 1928
- Publication place: Netherlands
- Preceded by: Clair-obscur (1927)
- Followed by: Eldorado (1928)

Oost-Azië (Dutch for "East Asia") is a volume of poetry by Dutch poet J. Slauerhoff. First published in 1928 under the pseudonym John Ravenswood, the collection contains poems whose theme is the Far East, a part of the globe Slauerhoff knew from his career as a sailor.

== Contents ==
Oost-Azië contains four sections. The first and the third are collections of various poems; the second and the third are themed sections, dedicated to Macao and Korea respectively.

1. 8 various poems, mostly landscapes and topical poems
2. a group of 4 poems about Macau, the last one a biographical sonnet about Luís de Camões
3. 15 various poems, including landscape and character sketches
4. 7 poems about Korea

The first section opens with an editorial comment, in which "J. Slauerhoff" explains that he is publishing these verses on behalf of the recently deceased "John Ravenswood", a Dutchman of Scottish descent, who had withdrawn from Western life to Jeju Island (then called "Quelpart" by Europeans) where he married a local woman after deserting the whaling ship on which he sailed.

Macau occupies an important place in Slauerhoff's work; it is the setting of his 1931 novel Het verboden rijk, in which Camões was one of the two protagonists. Oost-Azië's Macao section is dedicated to Constâncio José da Silva, an important Macanese newspaper editor. Two of the Macao poems, and a poem about a Portuguese fort in Asia, were translated into French for Fleurs de Marécage.

== Critical reception ==
Nico Donkersloot, in a comparison between Oost-Azië and Eldorado, which Slauerhoff published under his own name in the same year, called the former less grand than the latter, but with a more exciting "plasticity" in its poetry. Donkersloot describes the poems as finely-drawn sketches with exquisite lines that avoid the simplicity of easy rhymes and instead feature unexpected and curious "magnetic" rhymes, an effect achieved by rhyming polysyllabically. He compares the poems to Japanese prints, detailed and sharp and sometimes rivaling the work of Herman Gorter.

Hendrik Marsman noted that Oost-Azië appeared at roughly the same time as Eldorado, and that some of the poems would have fit better, perhaps, in that collection. Marsman singles out "Captain Miguel", a 44-line biography (dedicated to "J. Slauerhoff"!) of a former sailor who withdraws from life and settles for a mundane and repetitive existence aboard a coaster that goes up and down the coast of China. The poem's description of the "rough tramp's life of a desperado" is typical of Slauerhoff, and according to Marsman it is treated here more eloquently, in less "barbarous" verse, than in Eldorado, and unlike some of those poems is more easily "inhabited" by the reader. Oost-Azië focuses on landscapes, bays, objects, whereas Eldorado portrays people, and in a much more direct manner, in more or less autobiographical poems. On the whole, Marsman thought the collection decent though never of superior quality, and falling short of Slauerhoff's poetic talent.
