= Serenade (poetry collection) =

1930 poetry collection by J. Slauerhoff

- Cover of second edition
- Author: J. Slauerhoff
- Language: Dutch
- Genre: Poetry
- Publisher: The Halcyon Press (first ed.)
- Publication date: 1930
- Publication place: Netherlands
- Pages: 37
- Preceded by: Yoeng Poe Tsjoeng (1930)
- Followed by: Soleares (1933)

Serenade is a volume of poetry by Dutch poet J. Slauerhoff. First published in 1930, the poems in the collection are mostly personal and lyric. Critics have noted that some of the poems are inspired by 19th-century French poetry and are sexual, and they have responded in various ways, with assessments ranging from "childish" to "pure lyric". The themes of desperation and the desire to escape bourgeois life, common in Slauerhoff's other poetry, are found in Serenade as well, and two of the poems were used in an obituary for the poet, who died eight years after the publication of this volume.

== Content ==
The collection comprises 27 poems of between 6 and 48 lines. Four of the poems form a tetralogy called "For the children", containing a creation myth, a poem in which the dead lovingly address children, a narrative poem about a child that fell from the stars, and a poem in which a child compares the stars to a herd of animals and questions why they do not wander.

Many of the poems discuss sexual love. P. N. van Eijck noted that compared to earlier poems by Slauerhoff, the speaker seems to adopt a less antagonistic attitude toward the women addressed in the poems and figures as a lover (albeit a powerless and unsatisfied one) rather than a desperate man who opposes everything on principle. Van Eijck notes the dependence of many of the poems (and that of his Saturnus) on the French poetry of the 1850-1900 period and considers their genesis to be mostly sexual.

Other readers focused on the sense of desperation, of never being at home, found in some of the poems; A. G. W. Severijnen cited from two poems in Serenade in an obituary on the occasion of Slauerhoff's death. In "De voorpost" ("The outpost") and "In mijn leven..." ("In my life"), Severijnen sees Slauerhoff's disgust with ordinary bourgeois life, the desire to escape the mundane and to wander the earth.

== Publishing history ==
First published in 1930 by The Halcyon Press of Maastricht and Brussels (with E. du Perron having corrected the manuscript), it was reprinted four times by A. A. M. Stols (Maastricht/The Hague, in 1938, 1942, 1946, and 1954), and twice by Emanuel Querido (Amsterdam, 1978 and 1982). It was published (unchanged from the first edition) in 1982 by Nijgh & Van Ditmar as part of Slauerhoff's collected poetic works.

== Critical responses ==
De Voorpost

Mijn belegerd leven lijkt soms een voorloopige
Vestiging voor een toekomstig rijk;
Ik moet het houden, doe vaak wanhopige
Pogingen om ontijdig op te breken
Als ik lijd aan 't heimwee naar de zalige streken
Die ik verdedig en zelf nooit bereik.

The Outpost

My beleaguered life sometimes resembles a temporary outpost of a future kingdom; I have to defend it, often make desperate attempts to leave my post prematurely when I suffer of homesickness for the blessed realm that I defend, and never reach.

Hendrik Marsman thought that, on the whole, Serenade was bad, full of trivial material, and written in a very pedestrian style—the best that could be said about many of the poems was that they were not awful. Particularly, the fourth poem of the "For the Children" cycle invoked his wrath; he thought it childish. Marsman also commented that he could not get used to Slauerhoff's rhythm with its frequent syncopation, masculine rhymes, and monosyllabic phrases. The collection's bright side is half a dozen poems, which, according to Marsman, are Slauerhoff at his most powerful and personal.

E. du Perron responded directly to Marsman's commentary in a lengthy review of Slauerhoff's poetry. Du Perron sees no weak spots in the collection, liking even the poems Marsman did away with as childish. He separates them into two categories—lighter and of higher tone and heavier and more serious and claims not to want to miss a single stanza of Serenade. He noted "De Voorpost" and "In mijn leven..." as among the serious ones, the same poems Severijnen focused on in his obituary. Anton van Duinkerken also cites "Voorpost" as emblematic of Slauerhoff's life and desire.

Long after Slauerhoff's death, Victor E. van Vriesland revisited Serenade and Marsman's critique; van Vriesland argues that Serenade is the best Slauerhoff published before 1930, that he managed to overcome most of the "errors of his virtues". Those errors include capriciousness and a nonchalance intended to show his antipathy against the pose of literariness. In Serenade, van Vriesland argues that Slauerhoff left behind the "anecdotal character" of his earlier work. He praises the collection for its "pure lyric" and "refined technique" which still retained the unexpected and concise expression he had already demonstrated.
