= Eldorado (poetry collection) =

Volume of poetry by J. Slauerhoff

- Author: J. Slauerhoff
- Language: Dutch
- Genre: Poetry
- Publisher: C. A. J. van Dishoeck (first ed.)
- Publication date: 1928
- Publication place: Netherlands
- Preceded by: Oost-Azië (1928)
- Followed by: Fleurs de Marécage (1929)

Eldorado is a volume of poetry by Dutch poet J. Slauerhoff. First published in 1928, the collection gathers poems that speak mostly of sailors' and pirates' lives and desires. The poems contain familiar themes for Slauerhoff: a sailor's life, the impossibility of life on land or in society, the myth of the pirate and the Flying Dutchman.

== Content ==
Eldorado comprises 27 poems in seven sections. All, except for "Dschengis", rhyme in couplets or, especially if consisting of four-line stanzas, use rhyme schemes ABBA and ABAB (alexandrines).

1. "De piraat" ("The pirate"), a cycle of eight poems describing a pirate driven mostly by a desire for death;
2. Three poems, "Afrikaansche Elegie", "De Renegaat", "Het laatste zeilschip". The first two are about Europeans who live out lives of ennui (one in the colony of the Congo, and one in an unnamed jungle), and the third (dedicated to Jan Prins) is about a sailing ship that sinks after an attempt to rescue a steam-powered ship;
3. "Het eeuwige schip" ("The eternal ship"), a 144-line narrative poem about an "eternal" ghost ship, based on Arthur Rimbaud's "Le Bateau ivre";
4. Five poems, "Droomland", "Uiterste kust", "De Profundis", "Spookschip", "De vliegende Hollander"; the last two more with the Flying Dutchman theme, "Spookschip" ("Ghost ship") and "De vliegende Hollander" ("The Flying Dutchman");
5. Four poems about life at sea, "Columbus", "Camoes thuiskomst", "De Ontdekker", including one about Christopher Columbus and one from the point of view of Luís de Camões;
6. Three poems about life at sea, "Brief in een flesch gevonden", "Outcast", "Zeekoorts", the latter a liberal translation of John Masefield's "Sea-Fever";
7. Three short poems, "Pacifique", "De Matroos", "Uitreis van het kaperschip", the latter based on a poem by Tristan Corbière;
8. "Dschengis", a dramatic poem in unrhymed verse about Genghis Khan.

=== Flying Dutchman motif ===
Three of the poems address the myth of the Flying Dutchman, though literary critic H. T. J. Miedema wrote in an overview article of the myth in the 1950s that Slauerhoff is "less of a poète maudit fighting against God" than some of his contemporaries who used the theme. The theme was familiar to Slauerhoff, who had written a Flying Dutchman poem already before 1922. Whereas other Dutch poets were inspired more by German Romanticism (particularly Richard Wagner's Der fliegende Holländer, based on a short story by Heinrich Heine), Slauerhoff arrived by way of French poets who treated the related themes of the eternal ghost ship and the dead albatross. For instance, his Rimbaud-inspired "Het eeuwige schip" had been published in 1925 already, and before 1922 he had translated Charles Baudelaire's "L'Albatros". Literary critic S. P. Uri considers "Spookschip", which makes no overt reference to the theme, a better poem than "The vliegende Hollander"; like his other poems that treat the theme implicitly, it is a "strong visionary and symbolic poem, filled with typical Romantic feelings of demise, death, and decomposition". By contrast, he treats the theme in the overt "Flying Dutchman" almost satirically, in "forced language and sloppy rhymes". Uri surmises that perhaps Slauerhoff, who was never interested in "typical Dutch fare", chose to focus on the French Romantic aspects of the myth rather than the Dutch, Calvinist ones.

=== Tristan Corbière ===
Corbière is cited as one of Slauerhoff's influences and in his early years he had identified with the French poète maudit.

== Publishing history ==
First published in 1928 by C. A. J. van Dishoeck in Bussum, it was printed twice more by the same publisher (1942, 1946). It was published (unchanged) in 1982 by Nijgh & Van Ditmar as part of Slauerhoff's collected poetic works.

== Critical responses ==
J. C. Bloem (in De Gids, 1929) compared the poem "Afrikaansche elegy" ("African elegy"), which opens the second section, with the work of Charles Baudelaire (esp. "Parfum Exotique"); Bloem made his comparison in an overview of new Dutch poets whose "raw, jarring, and purposely unpolished" poetry had its flaws but was a welcome change from over-stylized predecessors. Raymond Herreman (Den Gulden Winckel, 1929) praised Slauerhoff for being a young Dutch poets who reacts strongly against two different tendencies he saw in contemporary poetry—a "verbose and hollow romanticism" that attempted to ingest the entire cosmos and was ready to explode, and a school that childishly inflated the tiniest psychological imbalance to inner drama. Eldorado, according to Herreman, was a breath of fresh air with verses full of violence and warmth, and on the whole expressed a deep desire to grasp life at its fullest. Poet and critic Nico Donkersloot noted that the glory days of Dutch lyric poetry seemed to have passed, and while praising Slauerhoff as the greatest poet of his generation said Eldorado was disappointing, possibly because of high expectations.

Hendrik Marsman, a fellow poet and critic, wrote a highly favorable review; in 1931, he wrote that of all contemporary poets Slauerhoff most closely exhibited the "original life force of the formative beginning, of the poetic force". He admired the apparent struggle between the formal, poetic power, whose desire is to express itself using the highest human faculty (language), a poetic power that is at the same time "thwarted, undermined, misled, and poisoned by nature".
