= Nijhof =

Nijhof is a Dutch surname. Notable people with the surname include:

- Henk Nijhof (born 1952), Dutch politician
- Marion Nijhof (born 1981), Dutch Paralympic swimmer
- Sanne Nijhof (born 1987), Dutch model

== See also ==
- Antoinette Hendrika Nijhoff-Wind
- Martinus Nijhoff (1894–1953), Dutch poet and essayist
