= Fleurs de Marécage =

French collection of poems by J. Slauerhoff

- Cover of second edition
- Author: J. Slauerhoff
- Translator: Hans van Straten
- Language: French/Dutch
- Genre: Poetry
- Publisher: A. A. M. Stols
- Publication date: 1929
- Publication place: Netherlands
- Preceded by: Eldorado (1928)
- Followed by: Saturnus (1930)

Fleurs de Marécage (Dutch subtitle Moerasbloemen, Dutch for "Swamp Flowers") is a collection of French poems by Dutch poet J. Slauerhoff, first published in 1929. Some are poems originally written in French, others are French translations by the poet of his originally Dutch poems.

== Publication history and content ==
The first edition was printed by A. A. M. Stols in Brussels. Stols was a prolific publisher in the 1920s, and E. du Perron worked for him in the late 1920s. Du Perron was interested in becoming a publisher of poetry in limited editions via subscriptions, and he edited and then published the second edition of Fleurs in the same year, with "Chaumont-Gistoux" listed as the publisher—Gistoux is the name of the Belgian town where du Perron lived, and in 1929 Slauerhoff stayed there with him. This edition was published as Fleurs de marécage. Poèmes de J. Slauerhoff. Précédés d'une lettre de Franz Hellens. The third was published in 1934, again by Stols, now in Maastricht. The fourth edition, published by Nijgh & Van Ditmar in The Hague in 1986, contained the Dutch originals for those poems translated into French by Slauerhoff, and translations of his original French poems by Hans van Straten.

Seven of the original French poems with translations by van Straten were published in 1986 in the Dutch literary magazine De Tweede Ronde. One poem ("Le galérien") was translated into Dutch by Slauerhoff himself (as "Op de galeien"), and one ("Imprudence") is a translation/adaptation into French by Slauerhoff of "The Mermaid", a poem by the Irish poet W. B. Yeats.

== Themes ==
According to Johann Lodewyk Marais, the importance of French symbolism became especially prominent in Slauerhoff's with the publication of Fleurs de Marécage, a collection which leans on that symbolism and particularly on Charles Baudelaire's Les Fleurs du mal. Marais cites a study by Van der Paardt, who argues that Slauerhoff has a profound distaste of visible, rationally comprehensible reality and attempts to seek the more absolute, ideal reality behind the visible one: Slauerhoff attempts to escape earthly limitations of time and space, and to develop a symbolic poetic which expresses the inexpressible.

A recurring theme in Slauerhoff's work is Macau; it is the setting of his 1931 novel Het verboden rijk, in which Luís de Camões was one of the two protagonists. Oost-Azië's Macao section is dedicated to Constâncio José da Silva, an important Macanese newspaper editor. From that collection, Slauerhoff translated two of those Macao poems, and a poem about a Portuguese fort in Asia, for Fleurs de Marécage.
