= Boudewijn Ietswaart =

Dutch graphic designer

Bernhard Jan Boudewijn Ietswaart (12 December 1936 in Amsterdam - 23 December 2010) was a Dutch graphic designer, illustrator and type designer who worked almost 20 years outside his native country, especially in Mexico, Spain and Venezuela. His hand-painted book covers are considered among the best of the genre. The University of Amsterdam maintains a collection of his work.

== Biography ==
=== Education and first works ===
Ietswaart, raised in a family of artists and editors, entered the Gerrit Rietveld academy to study with Theo Kurpershoek. He was recognized as an exceptionally talented student. Kurpershoek introduced him to Gerrit Noordzij and editor W. ten Have for which he as a student designed a series of book-covers. After graduating he designed as freelancer for editor Em. Querido in 1959 and 1960 a series of book covers.

==== Best edited books ====
Five books with covers drawn by Ietswaart were on the annual list of 50 best edited books, a list compiled by the organization Collectieve Propaganda van het Nederlandse Boek.

These books are the following:

===== 1959 =====
- Hans Jürgen Baden, De grenzen van de vermoeidheid, Ten Have, Carillon-reeks

===== 1960 =====
- Inez van Dullemen, De schaduw van de regen, Em.Querido
- Theun de Vries, Het motet voor de Kardinaal, Em.Querido
- Jan Engelman, Verzamelde gedichten, Em.Querio

===== 1963 =====
- Gerrit Achterberg, Verzamelde gedichten, Em.Querido

=== Mexico ===
Editor and graphic designer A.A.M. Stols worked as regional advisor in the 1950s for UNESCO in Latin America. In that capacity Stols was a professor at the National Autonomous University of Mexico (UNAM) and advisor with the editing house Fondo de Cultura Económica. The Dutch government and the United Nations signed in 1958 an agreement that was the start of the UN associate experts programme. Stols was able to create a position for an associate expert and offered it to Ietswaart, who had made a strong impression on Stols.

At the end of 1960 Ietswaart moved to Mexico. As UNESCO officer he assisted Stols at the UNAM and the Fondo de Cultura Económica. In the 18 months of his assignment, Ietswaart designed about 200 book covers, mainly for Fondo de Cultura Económica and the UNAM review. His work was influential among designers in Mexico. The so-called Balduina moment, after Ietswaarts first name in Spanish, marked a before and after in the use of images on book covers of the Fondo de Cultura Económica

=== Barcelona and South-America ===
Between 1964 and 1970 Ietswaart lived and worked in Barcelona where he worked for editors Luis Miracle, Editorial Juventud and Bertelsmann. In 1972 he travelled for work to Lima. After touring Venezuela, Colombia and Brasil he settled in Caracas where he worked among others for advertising agency ARS.

=== Amsterdam ===
Early 1975 Ietswaart returned to Amsterdam. He was appointed head of the graphics department of the Nederlandse Omroep Stichting. Two years later he resigned, unhappy with the company culture. He abandoned letter design and book covers to concentrate on illustrations for children´s books and scientific publications.

Early in the 21st century, Ietswaart was surprised by the attention his early work obtained. He was able to contribute in 2008-2009 to the exhibit of his work organized by graphic designers organization Cìrculo de Tipógrafos in Mexico in collaboration with Dutch designer Jan Middendorp.

== Personal life ==
Ietswaart was born in Amsterdam as son of David Ietswaart and Femmichje Jantina Smit. His father was an amateur illustrator. His mother worked at the Instituut voor Dialectologie, Volkskunde en Naamkunde and appears as Marietje Moederman in the book series Het Bureau by J.J. Voskuil.

In World War II Ietswaart moved with his family to the house of editor Berend Modderman. David Ietswaart and Berend´s son Sybren were good friends. The house contained a large collection of books that marked Ietswaart´s passion for cover design. Ietswaart´s mother remarried to Sybren Modderman after the war.

Ietswaart married Ingeborg Kurpershoek, costume and scenic designer and daughter of his teacher. In 1968 their daughter Anna was born.

At the end of 2010, after a short illness, Ietswaart died in Amsterdam at the age of 74.

== Tribute ==
- Ietswaart´s work in Mexico was the topic of the exhibit "El holandés errante" during the 53rd AtypI world congress in Mexico in 2009.
- Type designers of the Círculo de Tipógrafos de México developed in 2009 a family of seven fonts, named Balduina, following the anatomy of Ietswaart´s hand-painted letters. Ietswaart contributed in the design of missing letters. The fonts were distributed by FontShop.

== A selection of works ==
=== Book covers ===
==== The Netherlands ====
===== W. ten Have, Amsterdam: Carrillon-series =====
- Voorsorteren, M.L.W. Schoch, 1957
- Het was een vreemde nacht. Het brandoffer (2e druk), Albrecht Goes, 1959
- Luther, zijn weg en werk, W.J. Kooiman, 1959
- De grenzen van de vermoeidheid, H.J. Baden, 1959
- Hirosjima, John Hersey 1959
- Ons geloof, Emil Brunner, 1960
- Ver van de zwijgende planeet, C.S. Lewis, 1960
- De brug, K. Norel, 1960
- Brieven uit de hel en Schroefstik heft het glas, C.S. Lewis, 1962

===== Em. Querido, Amsterdam =====
- De schaduw van de regen, Inez van Dullemen, 1960
- Het motet voor de kardinaal, Theun de Vries, 1960
- Verzamelde gedichten, Jan Engelman, 1960
- Cider voor arme mensen, Hella Haasse, 1960
- Doen alsof, Adriaan van der Veen, 1960
- Ballade van de gasfitter, Autodroom, spel van de wilde jacht, Gerrit Achterberg, 1961
- Warmte, een woonplaats, Ellen Warmond, 1961
- Cryptogamen 4, Gerrit Achterberg, 1961
- Verzamelde gedichten, Gerrit Achterberg, 1963
- De gehoorzame dode, Willem Brakman, 1964
- De knagende worm, Uit de papieren van Jacobus Nachtegaal. Isaac Faro, 1964
- De chauffeur verveelt zich, Gerrit Krol, 1973

==== Mexico ====
===== Fondo de Cultura Económica =====
- La teoría sociológica, Nicholas S. Timasheff
- Campaña en el ejército grande. Domingo Sarmiento
- Historia de la economía en su relación con el desarrollo social, W. Stark
- Revolución Económica e industrialización en América Latina, Pedro Teichert
- Historia natural y moral de las Indias, Edmundo O´Gorman
- Historia económica y social de la edad media, Henri Pirenne

===== Universidad Nacional Autónoma de México =====
- El aguila, el jaguar y la serpiente, Miguel Covarrubias
- Cuadernos del Viento
- Revista de la Universidad de México, agosto 1961
- Visión de los vencidos, Miguel León-Portilla

===== Editorial Joaquín Mortiz S.A. =====
- La compasión divina, Joan Cau
- El tambor, Günter Grass

==== Barcelona ====
===== Luis Miracle =====
- Tratado de análisis económico, Roger Dehem, 1965
- Introducción a la psicología social, Peter Hofstätter, 1966
- Caracterología étnica, Paul Grieger, 1966
- Psicología Práctica, Charlotte Bühler, 1969
- Inteligencia y carácter, Robert Maistriaux, 1970
