= Soleares (poetry collection) =

- Author: J. Slauerhoff
- Language: Dutch
- Genre: Poetry
- Publisher: A. A. M. Stols
- Publication date: 1933
- Publication place: Netherlands
- Preceded by: Serenade (1930)
- Followed by: Een eerlijk zeemansgraf (1936)

Soleares is a volume of poetry by Dutch poet J. Slauerhoff. First published in 1933, and Slauerhoff's next-to-last volume, the poems in this collection center on Latin America and Portugal, and show a resignation or acquiescence not before seen in his poetry.

== Content ==
The volume contains lyric poems, varying in length between 10 and 54 end-rhymed lines. Stanzas are between 2 and 6 lines long. The two-line stanzas are rhyming couplets; four-line stanzas frequently rhyme a b a b. The poems are organized in seven sections:

1. Tristas (three poems, one of which a translation of Rubén Darío's "El cantor va por todo el mundo" from his El canto errante, and another a poem on the Gran Chaco)
2. Islas (four poems on islands: Fogo, Fernando de Noronha, Fernando Po, and Isla Salas y Gómez)
3. Saudades (six poems, including fados and a long poem on Macao)
4. Zambas (two poems set in colonies in or near the Andes with an anti-colonial and anti-Christian tone)
5. Sonetas (three Italian sonnets, the first a translation of Ruben Dario's "Earthquake" from his "Nicaraguan Triptych")
6. Coplas (four four-line stanzas of trimeter, rhyming a b a b)
7. Desenganas (two short poems about sex, guilt, and desire)

== Publishing history ==
The collection was to be called Saudades. First published in 1933 by A. A. M. Stols in Nijmegen in 15 hand-signed copies (according to Slauerhoff, 14 more than necessary). The second was the first trade edition, a revised edition with a number of poems excised, published in 1934. Following editions 1935, 1939, and 1940) were edited by Kees Lekkerkerker (and all published by Stols.

== Critical responses ==
Menno ter Braak praised Soleares highly in a review later collected in his In gesprek met de onzen (1946). He identifies Slauerhoff's poetry's main theme as "the desperado, the person who feels like an outcast in a world he regards with a mixture of revulsion, desperate affection, and sarcasm" and remarks that with Slauerhoff this isn't a pose but an innate quality of the man. Compared to his earlier collections the quality of the poetry has increased, but not at the expense of personality. Ter Braak cites "Vida triste", in which the speaker reflects on a love affair and begs for a way to kill his hellish passion, and finds in it Slauerhoff's continuing displeasure with existence and his fatal exile.

The volume was awarded the 1934 C.W. van der Hoogtprijs. Though Slauerhoff had been critical of the Maatschappij der Nederlandse Letterkunde, which awarded the prize, he did accept it, as a thank-you note written in Tangier on 2 July 1934.
