= J. Slauerhoff =

Dutch poet, writer and doctor (1898–1936)

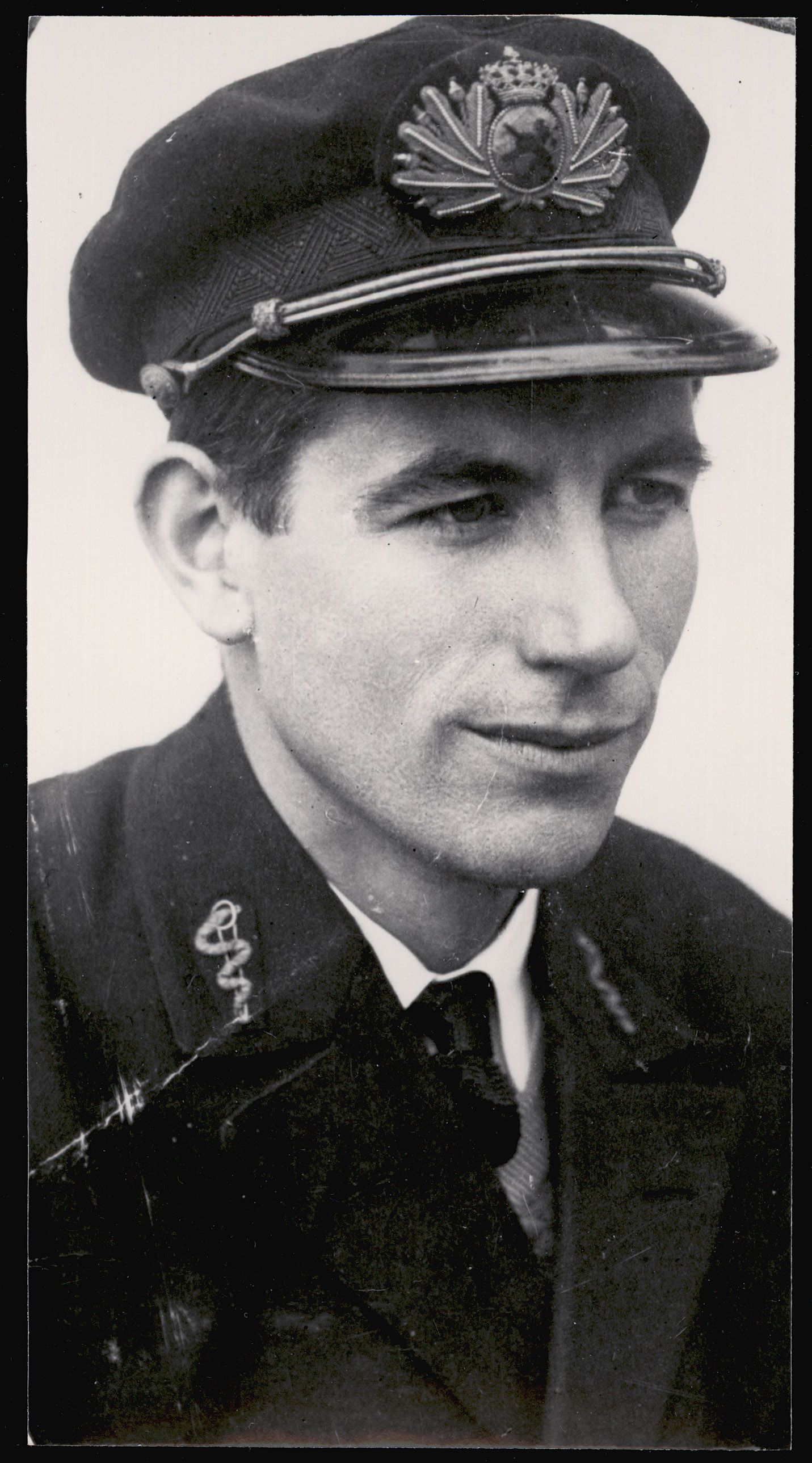
- Born: Jan Jacob Slauerhoff; 15 September 1898; Leeuwarden, Netherlands
- Died: 5 October 1936 (aged 38); Hilversum, Netherlands
- Education: Medicine
- Alma mater: Amsterdam Municipal University
- Occupations: Poet, novelist, general practitioner, ship's doctor
- Spouse: Darja Collin (1930–1935)
- Writing career
- Pen name: John Ravenswood (only occasionally)
- Period: 1918–36
- Notable works: Soleares (poetry), The Forbidden Kingdom (prose)
- Notable awards: C.W. van der Hoogtprijs; 1934 for Soleares

Jan Jacob Slauerhoff (15 September 1898 – 5 October 1936), who published as J. Slauerhoff, was a Dutch poet and novelist. He is considered one of the most important Dutch language writers.

== Youth ==
Slauerhoff attended HBS (secondary school) in Leeuwarden, where he first met fellow future writer Simon Vestdijk, who was from Harlingen. In 1916, Slauerhoff and Vestdijk both moved to Amsterdam to read medicine. While at the university, Slauerhoff wrote his first poems; his debut as a poet was in the Communist magazine De Nieuwe Tijd. He edited the Amsterdam student magazine Propria Cures from 1919 to 1920. In 1919, Slauerhoff became engaged to a Dutch language student, Truus de Ruyter. In 1921 he joined the staff of the literary magazine Het Getij and later that of De Vrije Bladen; in this period he became acquainted with poets Hendrik Marsman and Hendrik de Vries.

== Early career ==
His first collection of verse, Archipel ("Archipelago"), was published in 1923. Afterwards, he started working as a medical doctor on board of ships, especially in South East Asia. Much of his work refers to travel, to longing for far coasts, to China and Japan, and to the sea.

== Marriage, final years ==
From 1929 on, Slauerhoff stayed in the Netherlands more frequently. He was an assistant in the Utrecht University clinic for Dermatology and Venereal Diseases from 1929 to 1930. In September 1930, he married dancer and ballet teacher Darja Collin, the start of a short happy period in his life. By 1931, however, Slauerhoff had fallen ill again and left for the Italian health resort of Merano to recuperate. His wife followed him in 1932, so that they might experience the birth of their first child together. The child, Juan Darito, was stillborn, prompting a serious depression in Slauerhoff.

Later in 1932, Slauerhoff went to sea again, signing up with the Holland-West-Afrikalijn. His general bad health continued to trouble him and he considered moving to Northern Africa, as this would benefit his health. In March 1934, he set up a doctor's practice in Tangier, then an international protectorate, but by October he had left again. His periods of illness grew longer as the symptoms grew more serious, and his relationship with Darja deteriorated.

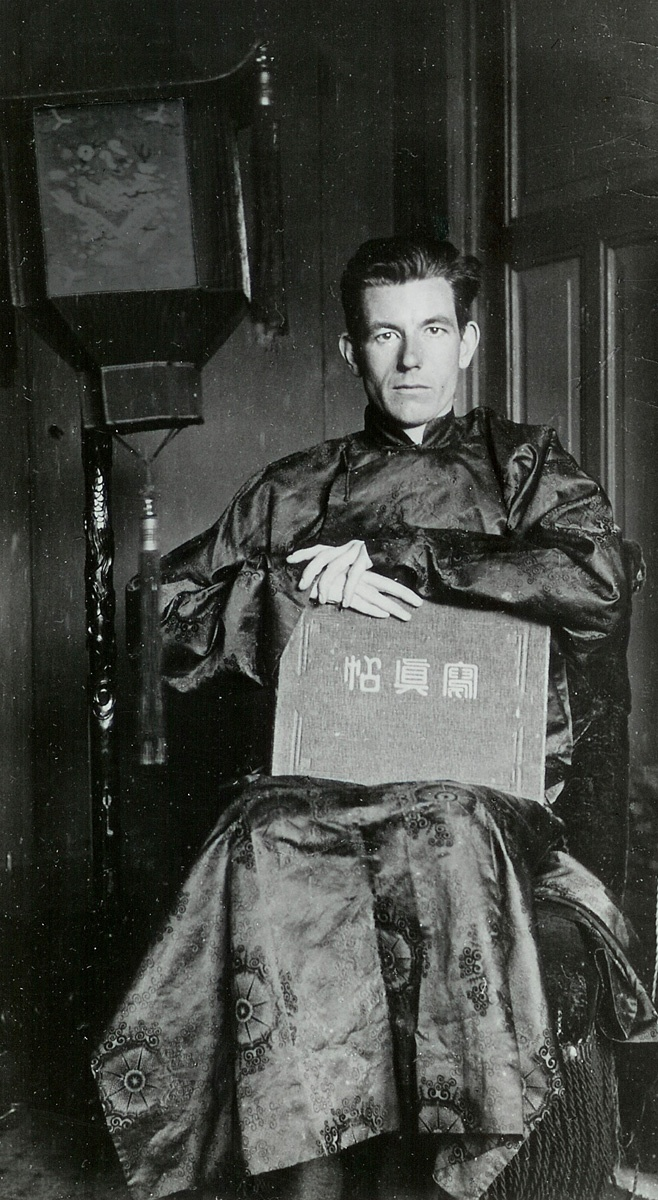
Slauerhoff wearing Chinese attire (Coll. Letterkundig Museum)

His fame as a writer, meanwhile, spread. In 1932 he published Het verboden rijk ("The Forbidden Kingdom"), a partly historical, partly magical realist novel combining the life of a 20th-century European with that of Luís de Camões, the 16th-century Portuguese poet (author of sonnets and the epic The Lusiads) who spent part of his life in the Orient. Despite not being translated into English until 2012, it attracted attention from scholars publishing in English. Jane Fenoulhet, for instance, referred to it as an important modernist novel in 2001. Both Het verboden rijk and the follow-up novel Het leven op aarde ("Life on Earth," 1934) were widely praised, and his 1933 verse collection Soleares was awarded the C.W. van der Hoogtprijs.

The year 1935 saw more sea voyages as a ship's doctor, but also his divorce from Darja Collin. In this period of his life, Slauerhoff fell out with many of his literary friends, among them Du Perron and Vestdijk. During his last voyage, to South Africa, he fell severely ill with malaria on top of his neglected tuberculosis and returned to Merano for yet more recuperation.

Still ill, he returned to the Netherlands in 1936 to take up residence in a nursing home in Hilversum, where he died on 5 October, just after his 38th birthday and one month after the publication of his last collection of verse, Een eerlijk zeemansgraf ("An Honourable Seaman's Grave").

== Style and themes ==
Though Slauerhoff writes in the time of expressionism, his poetry is, according to Garmt Stuiveling and G.J. van Bork, essentially romantic: strongly autobiographical, it evidences restlessness, imagination, and a longing for faraway places, expressed through an identification with tramps, discoverers, and pirates.

Much of Slauerhoff's work is concerned with the poor and downtrodden; especially the poetry collections Archipel (1923), Eldorado (1928), Soleares (1933), and Een eerlijk zeemansgraf (1936). A performance of his play Jan Pietersz. Coen (1930), highly critical of Jan Pieterszoon Coen (seventeenth-century officer of the Dutch East India Company in Indonesia and two-term Governor-General of the Dutch East Indies), was prohibited by the mayor of Amsterdam in 1948.

== Posthumous editions ==
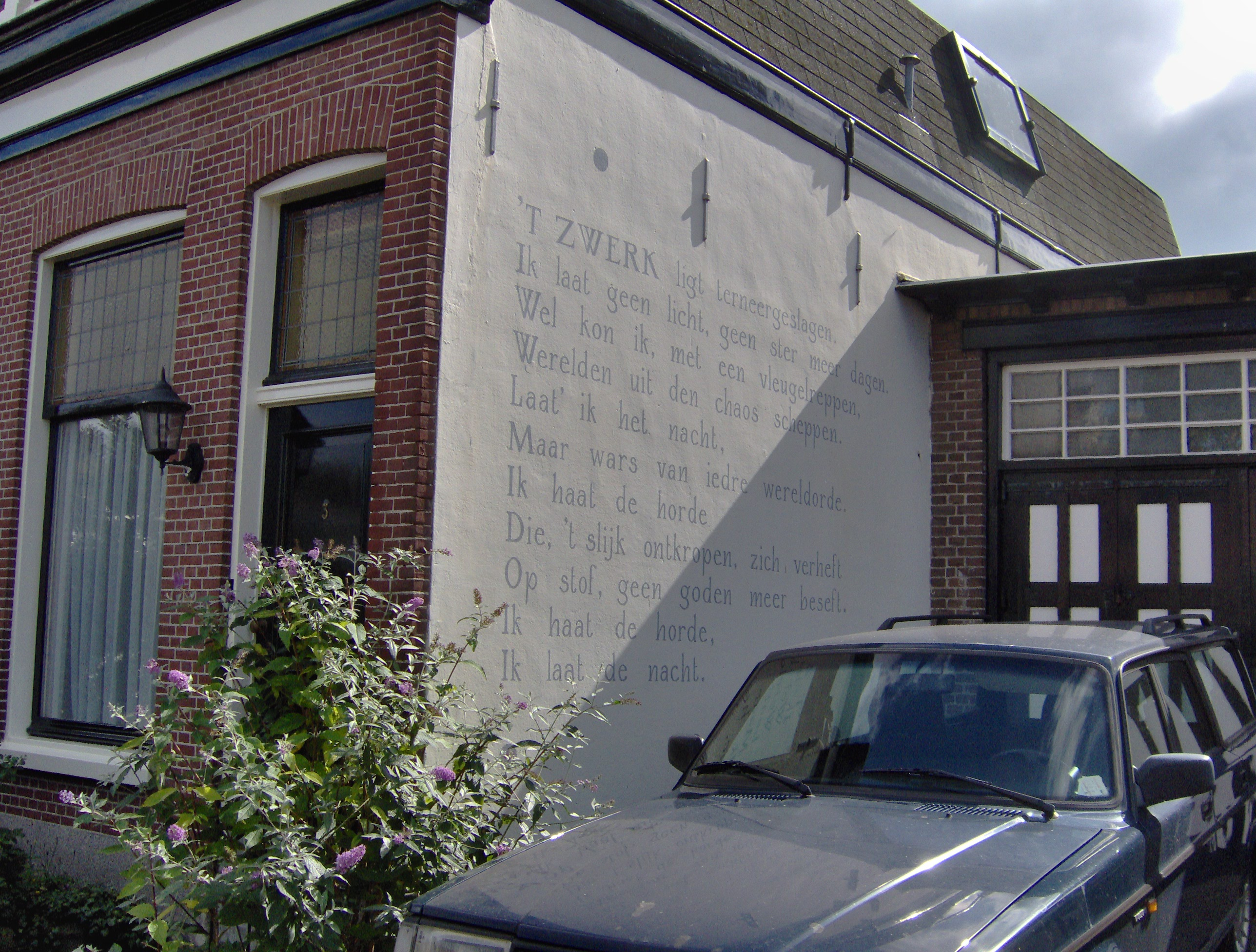
Poem by Slauerhoff on a wall in Leiden

Two works in progress that were nearly finished at the time of Slauerhoff's death, the original novel De opstand van Guadalajara ("The Guadalajara Uprising") and the translation of Martín Luis Guzmán's novel In de schaduw van den leider ("In the Shadow of the Leader"), were published posthumously in 1937.

A Committee for the Preparation of Slauerhoff's Complete Works was put together and convened to compile his Complete Works. This committee, which consisted of leading literary figures, among which a number of friends of Slauerhoff, included D.A.M. Binnendijk, Menno ter Braak, N.A. Donkersloot, J. Greshoff, Kees Lekkerkerker, Hendrik Marsman, Adriaan Roland Holst, and Constant van Wessem. Du Perron contributed a general outline for the ordering and grouping of the contents, but declined to participate further. Work progressed slowly and was further slowed down by the events of World War II. The first volume appeared in 1941, one year behind schedule, and the series of eight volumes was not completed until 1958. Two of the committee's members, Ter Braak and Marsman, died at the start of the war and the publisher, Nijgh & Van Ditmar, lost faith halfway through the project, which resulted in the intended separate volume of critical apparatus being scrapped and the last volume, containing Slauerhoff's essays, being published independently by Lekkerkerker. Lekkerkerker, ever the dedicated text researcher and caretaker of Slauerhoff's literary heritage, continued over the years to unearth and study Slauerhoff's manuscripts and uncollected publications, resulting in ever better versions of the Complete Poems and Complete Prose volumes.

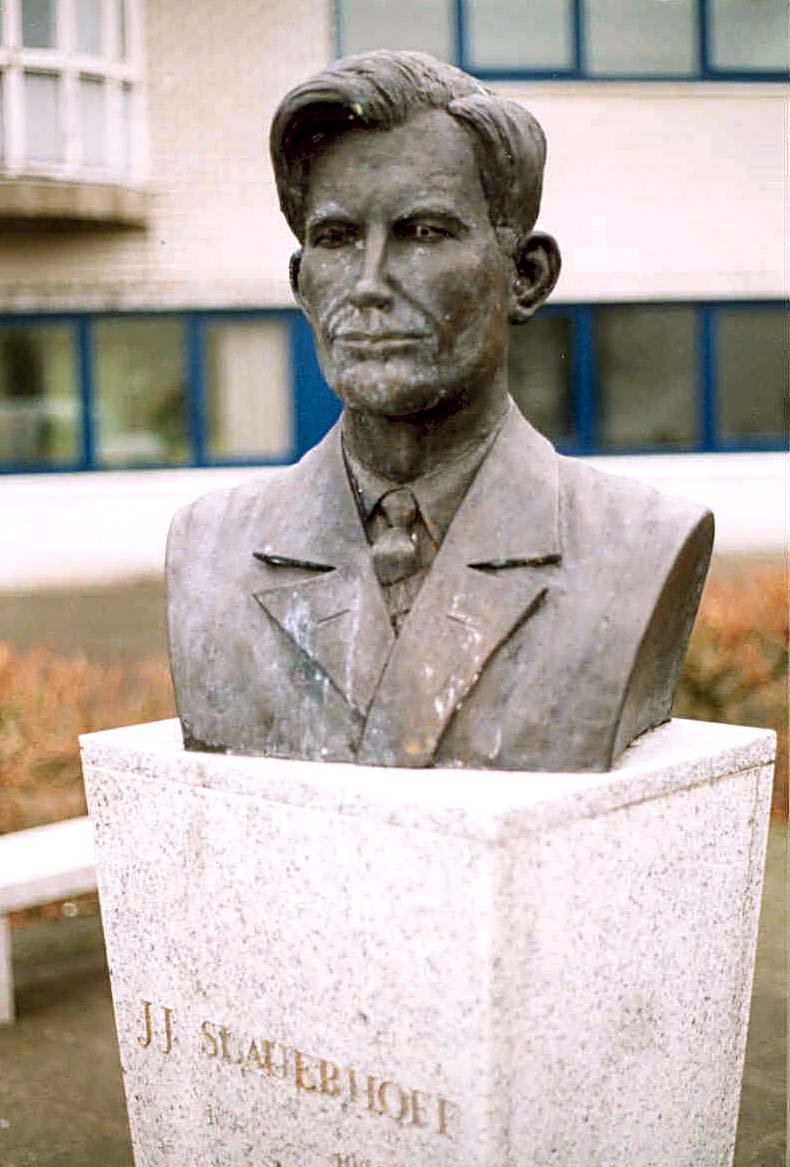
Sculpture of Slauerhoff in Huizum

In 2018 a revised complete edition of all his poems was published. Wim Hazeu, one of the main biographers of the Netherlands, published a revised edition of his Slauerhoff biography that same year. Slauerhoff's 1934 novel, Het leven op aarde, was republished by Handheld Press in a new English translation by David McKay as Adrift in the Middle Kingdom in 2019.

== Bibliography ==
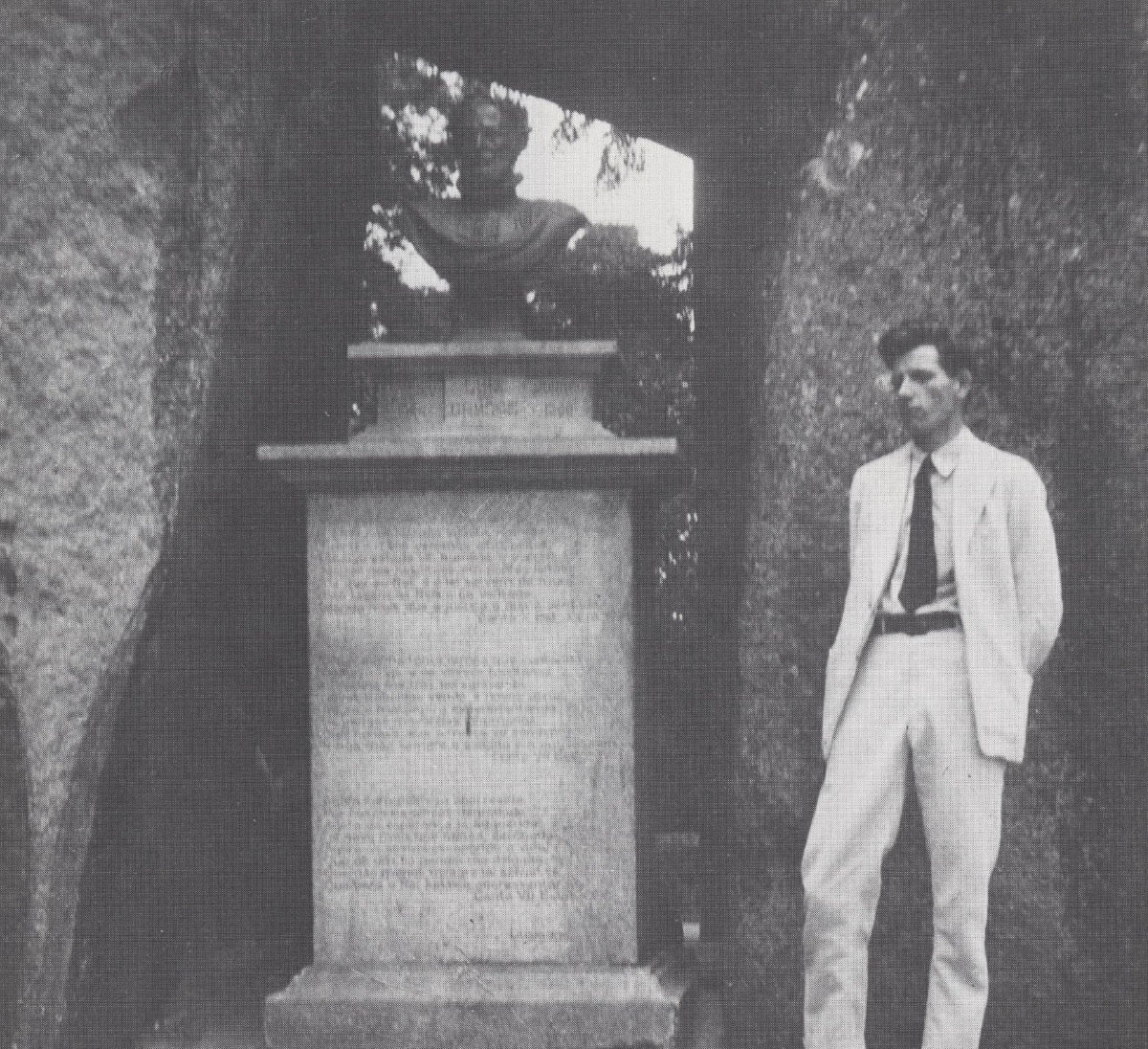
Slauerhoff near the bust of Luís de Camões in Macao

=== Poetry ===
- Archipel ("Archipelago", 1923)
- Clair-obscur (1927)
- Oost-Azië ("East Asia", 1928, under ps. John Ravenswood)
- Eldorado (1928)
- Fleurs de Marécage ("Marsh Flowers", 1929, in French)
- Saturnus ("Saturn", 1930, revised and enlarged re-issue of Clair-obscur)
- Yoeng Poe Tsjoeng ("Of Little Use", translations from the Chinese and original poems, 1930)
- Serenade (1930)
- Soleares (1933)
- Een eerlijk zeemansgraf ("An Honorable Sailor's Grave", 1936)
- Verzamelde gedichten ("Collected Verse", 1947)
- Al dwalend ("Wandering About", previously uncollected poems, 1947)
- Alleen in mijn gedichten kan ik wonen ("Only in My Poems Can I Dwell", anthology, 1978)
- Op aarde niet en niet op zee ("Not on earth, and not at sea"), poems selected by Henny Vrienten (Amsterdam: Nijgh & Van Ditmar 2000. ISBN 90-388-7039-6)
- In memoriam mijzelf ("In Memory of Myself", anthology, 2006)

=== Prose ===
==== Original prose ====
- Het Lente-eiland en andere verhalen ("The Isle of Spring and Other Stories", 1930, short stories)
- Schuim en asch ("Spume and Ashes", 1930, short stories)
- Het verboden rijk (1932, novel); translated into English by Paul Vincent as The Forbidden Kingdom (London: Pushkin, 2012, ISBN 978-1-906548-88-9)
- Het leven op aarde ("Life on Earth", 1934, novel); translated into English by David McKay as Adrift in the Middle Kingdom. Handheld Press, 2019 ISBN 978-1999944872
- De opstand van Guadalajara ("The Guadalajara Uprising", 1937, posthumously published novel)
- Verzameld proza ("Collected Prose", 1961)
- Verwonderd saam te zijn ("Strange Bedfellows", 1987, short stories and a one act play [1928–1935])
- Alleen de havens zijn ons trouw ("Only the Ports Are Loyal to Us", 1992, travelogue short stories [1927–1932])

==== Translated prose ====
- Ricardo Güiraldes – Don Segundo Sombra (1930, 1941², 1948³; from Spanish with R. Schreuder)
- José Maria de Eça de Queiroz – De misdaad van Pater Amaro ("The Crime of Father Amaro", 1932; from Portuguese with R. Schreuder)
- Guillermo Hernández Mir – De hof der oranjeboomen ("The Court with the Orange Trees", 1932; from Spanish with R. Schreuder)
- Paulo Setúbal – Johan Maurits van Nassau ("John Maurice of Nassau", 1933; from Portuguese by R. Schreuder with J. Slauerhoff)
- Ramón Gómez de la Serna – Dokter hoe is het mogelijk ("Doctor Improbable", 1935; from Spanish)
- Martín Luis Guzmán – In de schaduw van den leider ("In the Shadow of the Leader", 1937; from Spanish with G.J. Geers, published posthumously)
- Jules Laforgue – Hamlet, of De gevolgen der kinderliefde ("Hamlet, or The Consequences of Filial Love", 1962, 1970²; from French [1928])
- Thomas Raucat – Twee verhalen ("Two Short Stories", 1974; from French [1929])

=== Drama ===
- Jan Pietersz. Coen (1931, tragedy)

=== Miscellaneous ===
- Verzamelde werken ("Complete Works", 8 vols., 1941–1958)
- Brieven van Slauerhoff ("Letters from Slauerhoff", ed. by Arthur Lehning, 1955)
- Dagboek ("Diary", ed. by Kees Lekkerkerker, 1957)
- Verzameld Proza ("Collected Prose"), 2 vols. (The Hague: Nijgh & Van Ditmar 1975. ISBN 90-236-5569-9 (vol. 1) and ISBN 90-236-5570-2 (vol. 2))
- Slauerhoff student auteur ("Slauerhoff Student Writer", prose and poetry from Slauerhoff's student days ed. by Eep Francken et al., 1983)
- Brieven aan Hans Feriz ("Letters to Hans Feriz", ed. Herman Vernout, 1984)
- Het China van Slauerhoff: aantekeningen en ontwerpen voor de Cameron-romans ("Slauerhoff's China – Notes and Outlines for the Cameron Novels", ed. W. Blok et al., 1985)
- Hij droeg de zee en de verte aan zich mee ("He Carried the Sea and the Distance with Him", letters ed. by J.J. van Herpen, 1985)
- Cristina Branco Canta Slauerhoff (Cristina Branco Sings Slauerhoff, 9 poems translated into Portuguese and put to Fado music, 2000)
- Van een liefde die vriendschap bleef ("Of a Love that Remained Friendship", letters ed. by Wim Hazeu, 2007)
- Het heele leven is toch verloren ("Life Is a Lost Cause Anyway", poems, letters, diaries, ed. by Arie Pos et al.) ISBN 978-90-814450-7-8
- Slauerhoff Biografie Wim Hazeu, 2018
- J. Slauerhoff Verzamelde gedichten 2018, bezorgd door Hein Aalders en Menno Voskuil

There are a number of German, French, Italian, Ukrainian, and Portuguese translations of his prose works and Russian translations of his poetry.
