= Terzij de Horde =

Dutch black metal band

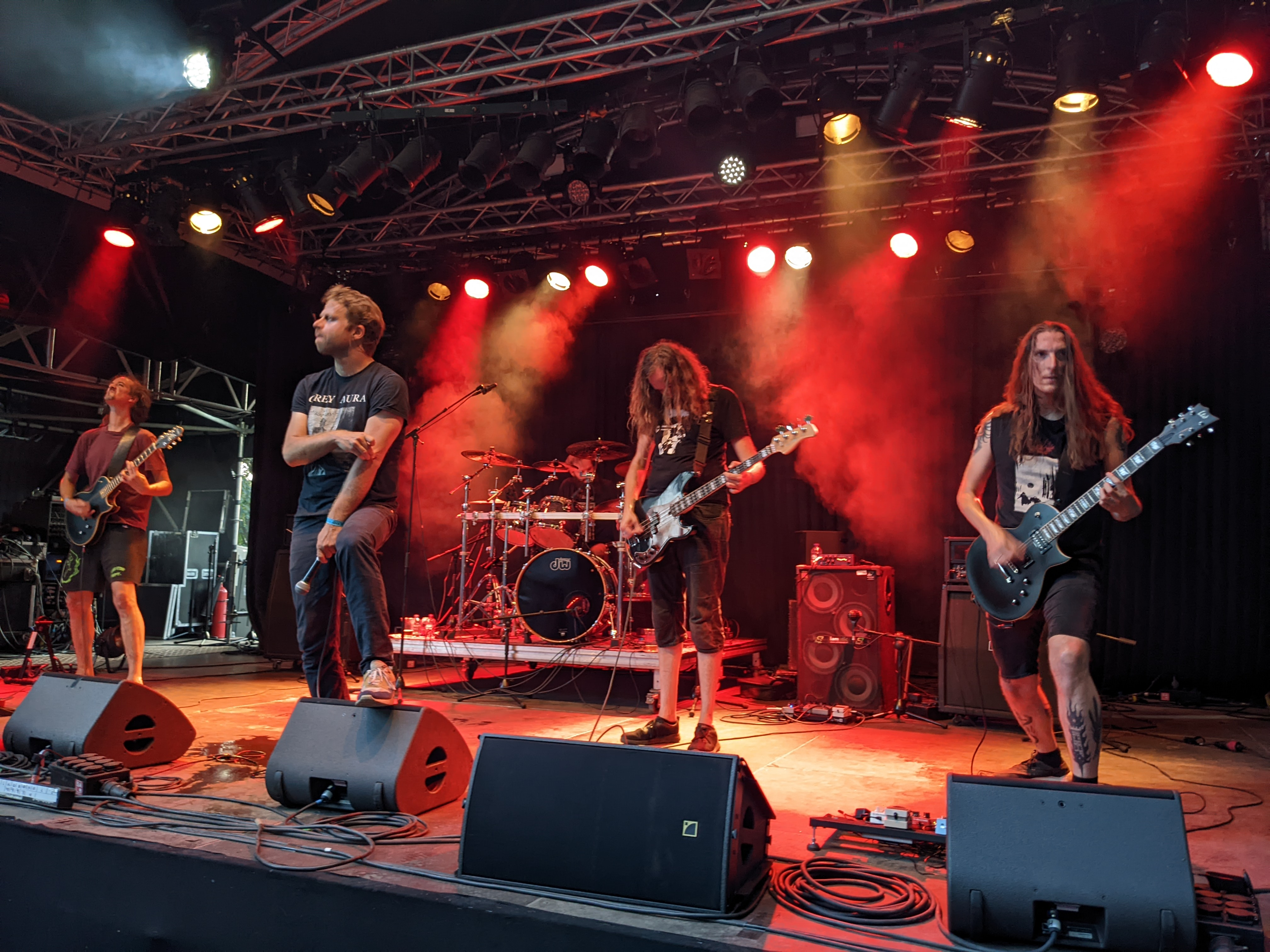
- Terzij de Horde at the Valkhof Festival 2022

Background information
- Origin: Utrecht, Netherlands
- Genres: Black metal, post-metal, post-hardcore
- Years active: 2010–present
- Labels: Burning World, Consouling Sounds, Tartarus, Anthitetic
- Members: Joost Vervoort; Johan van Hattum; Demian Snel; Richard Japenga; Jelle Agema
- Website: terzijdehorde.bandcamp.com

Terzij de Horde is a Dutch black metal band with dark vitalism as a central theme, from Utrecht, formed in 2010. They are known for taking their inspiration from mostly literary and academic sources and intense live performances.

Terzij de Horde is (poetic) Dutch for "set apart from the horde". It is a line from the poem "Einde" (ending) by legendary Dutch poet Hendrik Marsman. Marsman is an inspiration to the band, as are many other authors and philosophers in the same dark, vitalistic vein.

== History ==
Starting out as Liar Liar Cross On Fire in 2007, the band grew away from its sonic roots in grindcore and crusty hardcore, and toward more dark atmospherics. Throughout their existence, the band has been described as a mix between Khanate, Wolves in the Throne Room, Deathspell Omega and Neil Perry.

In April 2010, Terzij de Horde played their first show under that name with Altar of Plagues, Year of No Light and Starve to release their EP A Rage of Rapture Against the Dying of the Light. Since then, the band has received widespread international attention and many very positive reviews both of their recorded music and of their explosive live performances. In June 2011, the EP was rereleased on vinyl by Antithetic Records (Kayo Dot, Maudlin Of The Well, Young & In The Way).

In 2011, Terzij de Horde released a split 12" with fellow countrymen Starve entitled and themed "A Chosen Hollow", on which Lurker said: "…. Relying less on dissonance and more on moving atmospherics than their debut ever suggested, this is a startling leap forward for a band already ahead of the game. The welding of slow-burning doom and cacophonic black metal returns here, but the hardcore punk assault has been toned down as the band edges closer to their musical ideals. As Alex put it: "There's nothing more awe-inspiring in life than witnessing a band growing into its own beastly element of relentless, cathartic rage."

2015 saw Terzij de Horde return with their first full-length Self. The album focuses on the problem of self, with each track exploring different ways to live or fail to live with self and world, and the struggles these paths and strategies create. In the six songs that constitute Self, the rage of black metal is paired with a cathartic destruction as well as a contemplative, sometimes crawling melancholy.

Throughout the years, Terzij de Horde played all over the Netherlands, toured the UK, Ireland and Germany, shared the stage with the likes of Liturgy, Dragged into Sunlight, Laster, Gnaw Their Tongues, Anaal Nathrakh, Bone Awl, Envy and God Dethroned and played festivals like Roadburn, Le Guess Who?, Eurosonic Noorderslag, Siege Of Limerick, Incubate Festival, Ieper Hardcore Fest, Doom Over Leipzig, Into Darkness, Black Metal Desecration and State-X New Forms.

Under the name of Footprints in the Void, the band provided a live platform for doom, black, sludge, noise and drone acts in their home city of Utrecht. Bands involved were, among others, Thou, Aderlating, Alkerdeel, Celeste, Moloch, Conan, Dragged into Sunlight and Aluk Todolo.

Members of Terzij de Horde partake in the Maalstroom collaboration of the 2019 edition of Roadburn Festival.

== Discography ==
- 2010: A Rage of Rapture Against the Dying of the Light self-released debut EP
- 2011: A Rage of Rapture Against the Dying of the Light EP re-released on vinyl by Antithetic Records (Kayo Dot, Fell Voices, Young & In The Way, The Great Old Ones).
- 2012: A Chosen Hollow a split 12" with fellow countrymen Starve on Badger Records
- 2014: Seeping through the Cracks (Neil Perry cover) contributed to a split in the Elemental Nightmares series also containing songs by Wildernessking, Waning and Mondvolland.
- 2015: Wacht / Lex Barbarorum EP released alongside the book Hendrik Marsman – A Crooked Flower in Cosmos' Flailing Mouth
- 2015: Hendrik Marsman – A Crooked Flower in Cosmos' Flailing Mouth – a selection and translation by Terzij de Horde Book with a selection of never before translated poems by one of the most distinguished Dutch poets, Hendrik Marsman.
- 2015: Self Debut album on Burning World Records (LP) Consouling Sounds (CD) and Tartarus Records (cassette)
- 2016: Forever Out Of Control: A Tartarus Mixtape Terzij de Horde contributed 'Absence'. Released by Tartarus Records (cassette)
- 2022: In One of These, I Am Your Enemy album on Consouling Sounds (LP and CD) and Tartarus Records (cassette)
- 2025: Our Breath Is Not Ours Alone album on Church Road Records (LP and CD), Tartarus Records (cassette) and Fiadh Productions (cassette)

== Gallery ==
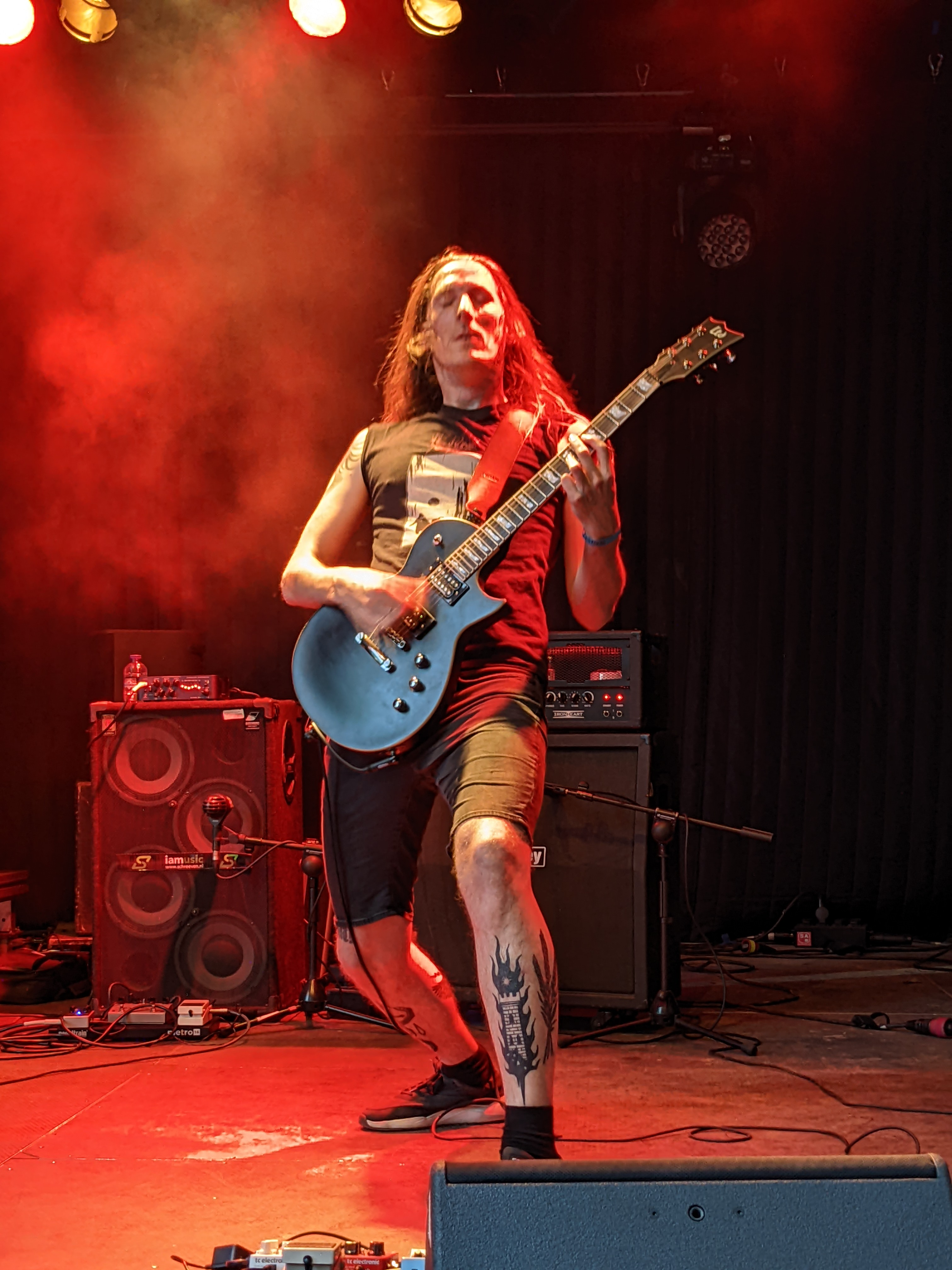
Guitarist Jelle Agema

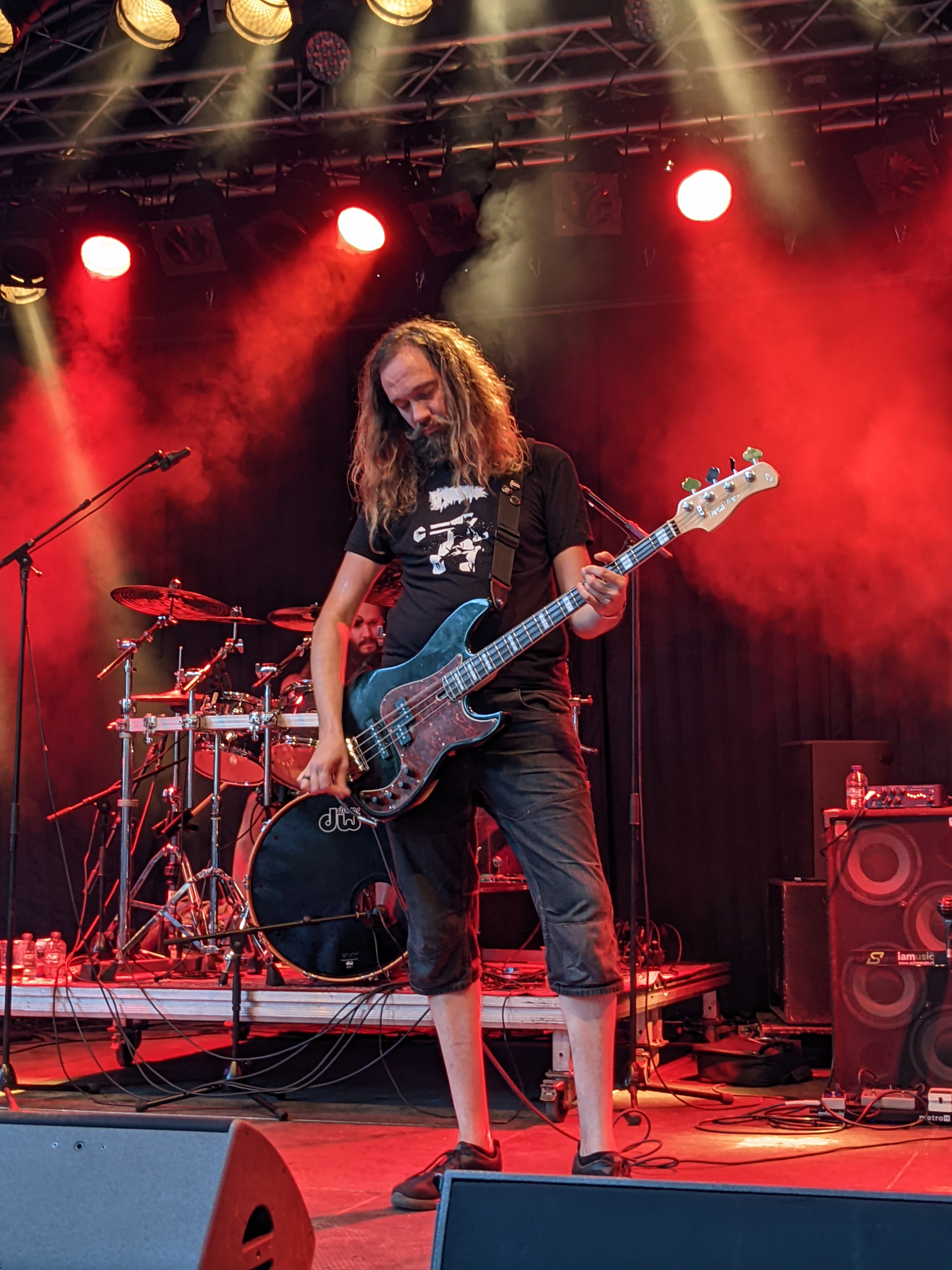
Bass guitarist Johan van Hattum

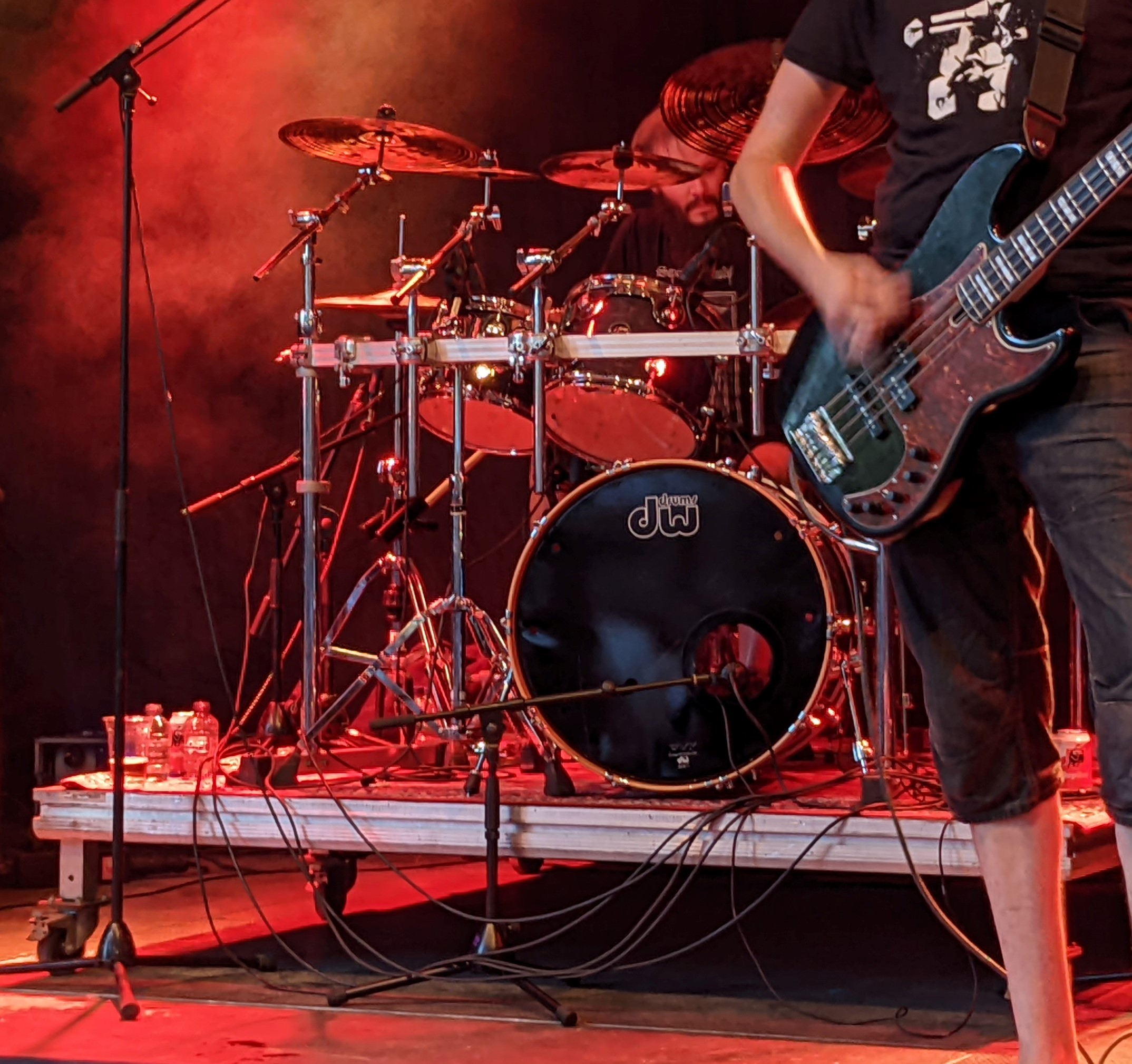
Drummer Richard Japenga

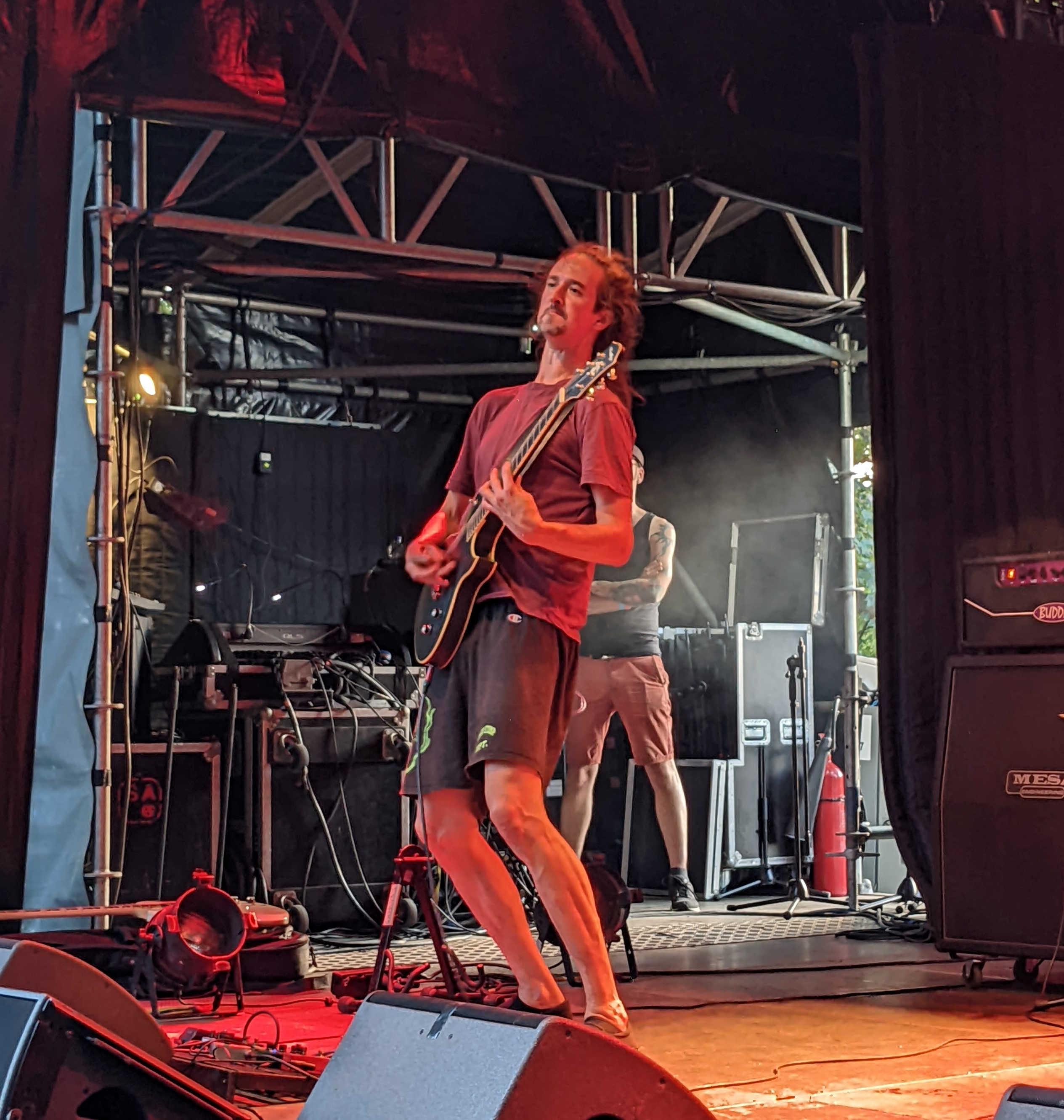
Guitarist Demian Snel

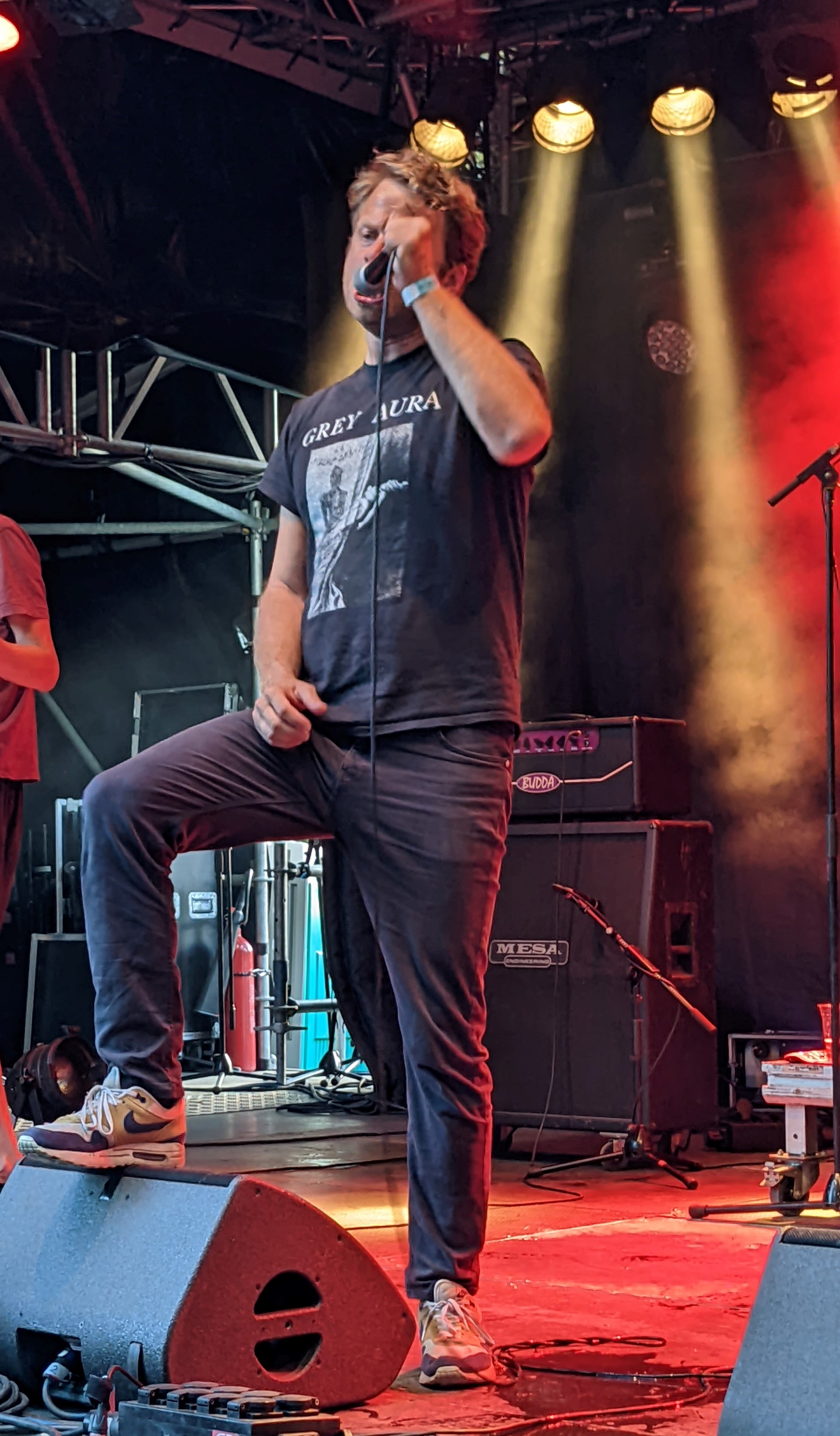
Singer Joost Vervoort
