= Saturnus (poetry collection) =

Poetry collection by Dutch poet J. Slauerhoff

- Cover of first edition
- Author: J. Slauerhoff
- Language: Dutch
- Genre: Poetry
- Publisher: Hijman, Stenfert Kroese & Van der Zande
- Publication date: 1930
- Publication place: Netherlands
- Pages: 59
- Preceded by: Fleurs de Marécage (1929)
- Followed by: Yoeng Poe Tsjoeng (1930)

Saturnus is a volume of poetry by Dutch poet J. Slauerhoff. First published in 1930, the collection gathers the poems earlier published in Clair-Obscur, published by Slauerhoff in 1927 without his editorial oversight (Slauerhoff was in the Netherlands Indies at the time), with some additional poems.

== Content ==
The content of the poems in the collection falls mostly in three categories: historical characters, locations set in a specific time period, and French symbolist poetry.

The first four poems are a cycle centered on the Merovingian king Chlothar II. Beginning with a sketch of the aging king now withdrawn in a monastery, in the next two poems the boy's childhood and adolescence are treated. The last poem shows Clothar's affection for his cruel mother Fredegund and describes her grave; he caresses, in "secret sin", a miniature of her. Literary scholar and historian Jan van der Vegt sees Slauerhoff in Chlothar. In that same cycle, Chlothar is aroused at night by the image of a woman, a singular dreamed figure set apart from the other women at the court. Her ephemeral presence makes him break through a window, the glass cutting him and blood dripping down the wall. Literary critic H. A. Gomperts cites this as one example of the treatment of women in Slauerhoff's poetry: an unapproachable or unattainable woman is simultaneously desired and rejected, and even despised for her lack of chastity, a reproach made to Fredegund as well. Gomperts notes that one other poem in Saturnus, "Le passé vivant", also features the image of a lover breaking through glass—in that case, a mirror.

== Critical responses ==
An early review by Flemish critic and professor of literature Dr. J.A. Goris (who published poetry under the pseudonym Marnix Gijsen) called Saturnus "hermetic", and Goris remarked on the high tension in Slauerhoff's diction, which he said was detrimental to the sound of the poetry but good for its strength and fullness. He also criticized Slauerhoff's rhymes and his knowledge of French. Slauerhoff's friend E. du Perron in turn savagely criticized Goris's review.
