= Hans Feriz =

Austrian-Dutch physician and amateur achaeologist (1895–1970)

Hans (Paulus) Feriz (born Hans Feischl) (1895 – 1970) was an Austrian-Dutch physician and amateur archaeologist specialised in American archaeology. He spent most of his professional life in the Netherlands. Since the late 1940s he carried out excavations in South and Central America and donated numerous objects he had found to the Tropenmuseum in Amsterdam (today part of the National Museum of World Cultures). Most of the museum's pre-Columbian collection can be traced back to him.

== Birth and family background ==
Hans Feriz was born as Hans Feischl on 23 August 1895 in Vienna, Austria. Feriz married on 17 May 1926 in Amsterdam, The Netherlands, the four years younger Leonie Catharina Hermine Wilde who was born in Haarlem, The Netherlands, to parents of Dutch and Prussian descent. In the marriage register, Feriz' parents appear under their new last name "Feriz".

== Studies and professional career as a surgeon ==
He studied medicine in Vienna, Göttingen, Cologne, Munich, and Amsterdam, graduating as a medical doctor at Munich in 1921 on a topic of pathological anatomy. After World War I, he emigrated to the Netherlands, where he worked as an assistant to Prof. Willem Marius de Vries at the University of Amsterdam from 1921 to 1923. In 1923 he became a resident assistant at the surgical clinic of the famous surgeon Prof. Otto Lanz, who was also a well-known art collector. In 1930, he was admitted as privat-docent of surgical pathology. After Lanz' death in 1935, Feriz continued to teach pathological anatomy at the University of Amsterdam for five more years while establishing himself as a surgeon with his own practice, to which he dedicated himself exclusively after leaving the university in 1940. Occasionally, Feriz worked as a ship's doctor which led him to travel to the Americas. During his time as a research assistant, Feriz published various articles in pathological anatomy and occasionally continued to publish in medical journals until the 1940s. In 1926, he was the first one to publish about macrodystrophia lipomatosa, a rare congenital non-hereditary disorder.

== Activity as an amateur archaeologist (from 1947 onwards) ==
On a voyage to New York in 1931, Feriz visited the Museum of Natural History and became interested in objects from Central and South America. In 1947, he first visited Peru and was fascinated by pre-Columbian culture. On land owned by an acquaintance, he started his activities as an amateur archaeologist, excavating Moche culture pottery. Further trips to Bolivia, Ecuador, Colombia, Panama, Costa Rica, Suriname, and the Netherlands Antilles followed. In the 1950s, he lectured and published on topics related to his archaeological finds and started to exchange with the staff at Amsterdam's Royal Tropical Institute. His knowledge and experience led to his appointment in 1955 as an honorary curator of Latin American Archaeology at the institute's department of Cultural and Physical Anthropology. Throughout his lifetime, he donated numerous objects he had found to the Tropenmuseum, then still part of the institute. Much of the Tropenmuseum's pre-Columbian collection (today part of the National Museum of World Cultures) can be traced back to Hans Feriz, covering an area ranging from Alaska to Brazil, and dating from between 3000 BC to the 15th century. Other archaeological objects remained with his family. In 2025, more than 30 objects from this private collection were repatriated to Central and South America.

From 1951 onwards, Feriz published numerous articles in archaeological and ethnological journals where he described and discussed the objects he had excavated. In his book "Zwischen Peru und Mexiko" ("between Peru and Mexico"), published in 1959, Feriz assembled a collection of his papers and notes on archaeological topics from his voyages between 1949 and 1958. His main preoccupation was, following the trend of the time, to investigate the cultural links between the high cultures of the Andes region and Mesoamerica, which in his fieldwork led him to lay an important focus on the cultures of Panama, Costa Rica, and Ecuador. Unlike other scholars of the time, Feriz defended the hypothesis of a south–north influence of Peruvian cultures on Mesoamerican high cultures. From his archaeologist colleagues, Feriz obtained mixed reviews for his publications: some of them welcomed his new perspective and his talent as a keen observer, at the same time criticising his lack of rigour in systematically developing his hypothesis and pointing to shortcomings in handling his bibliographic references.

In 1956–1957, the Royal Tropical Institute and the Ethnographic Museum in Rotterdam organised two exhibitions "Central Americas Unknown Treasures" and "Between Peru and Mexico", displaying pieces from Feriz' own collection as well as items on loan from other collections that Feriz had brought to the Netherlands. Another exhibition of objects collected by Feriz in Latin America, entitled "With Shovel and Brush", was held posthumously at the Tropenmuseum in 1971.

Feriz' activities in Southern Central America, lasting until 1962, fell in a period characterised by increased US corporate and geopolitical interests in the region (United Fruit Company; Panama Canal), which facilitated amateurs and professional archaeologists' fieldwork. At the same time, strict professional standards for registering archaeological sites had not yet been established, as archaeological excavations in the region had begun relatively late, compared to the neighbouring regions in Mesoamerica or South America. Furthermore, since the mid-20th century, a global market for "pre-Columbian Art" had developed, as a result of which archaeological objects from the region became both collectable and marketable and therefore increasingly found their way to private collectors and museums in North America and Europe. Feriz was a member of the Archaeological Society of Panama, which was composed of professional and amateur archaeologists, alongside commercially oriented actors and members of American military intelligence, such as Samuel Kirkland Lothrop, who appears to have used his activity as a professional archaeologist as a cover for his spy missions. The members of the association were predominantly North-American, Feriz being one of only three Europeans. Müller and Berger (2024) point to the society's “great moral ambiguity”, as many of its members were “primarily interested in amassing collections for the market, rather than contributing to archaeological research” (p. 191). In fact, important professional archaeological excavations in the region were financed by wealthy US collectors with the intent of building up private collections, while pioneering archaeologists had ties to U.S. political and corporate interests. Given his connections to the Amsterdam museum and his numerous publications, Feriz helped providing the society with an "academic veneer", while in return benefitting from facilitated access to excavation sites and to material that was excavated by others. He thus was an integral part of a movement that conceived of "archaeology" as being primarily about extracting objects of commercial or scientific value from the region while neglecting the meticulous documentation and conservation of the excavation sites. As Cooke and Sánchez (2024) note, Lothrop and other leading archaeologists of that time did not hesitate to cooperate with looters operating without permission of the government and played themselves an active role in damaging some of the key sites, despite their cooperation with the government (p. 18).

Feriz himself acted as an amateur archaeologist and private collector which had strong ties with the Amsterdam museum and regularly donated pieces to the museum throughout the years of his activity, while at the same time preserving a large part of the collection to himself. Shortly before his death, in 1969, he donated around 1440 pre-Columbian artifacts to the museum, while again keeping others to himself, which after his death would remain with his family. His last donation to the Tropenmuseum almost doubled the number of objects he had already donated or sold to the museum in earlier years. The collection comprises pottery, textiles, tools, beads, musical instruments, and other objects.

== Death ==
Feriz died on 31 August 1970 in Montreux, Switzerland, during a short trip, shortly after his 75th birthday.

== Trivia ==
J. Slauerhoff, Brieven aan Hans Feriz (Amsterdam: De Arbeiderspers, 1984) is a published collection of personal correspondence from the Dutch poet and novelist J. Slauerhoff to his friend Hans Feriz. The letters date from the period of 1924 to 1936, offering insight into Slauerhoff's restless life, his struggles with illness, his time as a ship's surgeon, and his views on literature.

== Bibliography ==
- Feriz, H. (1921). Trockenhefe als Prophylaktikum gegen Rachenkrankheiten. DMW-Deutsche Medizinische Wochenschrift, 47(42), 1264–1264.
- Feriz, H. (1922). Eine Modifikation der „Rekord”-Spritze. DMW-Deutsche Medizinische Wochenschrift, 48(50), 1679–1679.
- Feriz, H. (1923). Über akzessorische, aus der Arteria pulmonalis communis entspringende Kranzarterien. Frankfurt. Ztschr. Path., 29, 329.
- Feriz, H. (1925). Ein Fall von Spina bifida thoracolumbalis mit elephantiastischer Fingermißbildung. Virchows Archiv für pathologische Anatomie und Physiologie und für klinische Medizin, 257(1), 503–511.
- Feriz, H. (1925). Neurofibromatosis und Sarkom. Deutsche Zeitschrift für Chirurgie, 192(6), 372–380.
- Feriz, H. (1925). Zur Symptomatologie der Basalzellenkrebse der Haut. DMW-Deutsche Medizinische Wochenschrift, 51(43), 1773–1774.
- Feriz, H. (1926). Makrodystrophia lipomatosa progressiva. Virchows Archiv für pathologische Anatomie und Physiologie und für klinische Medizin, 260(2), 308–368.
- Feriz, H. (1928). Chirurgische Stoffwechselprobleme. DMW-Deutsche Medizinische Wochenschrift, 54(36), 1497–1499.
- Feriz, H. (1928). Appendizitis und Streptokokken. DMW-Deutsche Medizinische Wochenschrift, 54(47), 1970–1971.
- Feriz, H. (1929). Ein Fall von „Freitags-Neurose“ aus dem Jahre 1768. Archiv f. Psychiatrie 88, 612–614.
- Feriz, H. (1941). Catgut and collagen. Surgery, 10(2), 326–335.
- Feriz, H. (1951). Die Köpfe von Esmeraldas: Glieder einer Brücke zwischen der präcolumbianischen Kultur Zentralamerikas und Perus. Geographica Helvetica, 6(1), 246–250.
- Feriz, H. (1957). Suriname: een reisverslag. Koninklijk Inst. voor de Tropen.
- Feriz, H. (1958). Demonstration of a south-Peruvian arrow throwing-stick. Proceedings of the Thirty Second International Congress of Americanists: 441-444, Munksgaard, Copenhagen.
- Feriz, H. (1959). Zwischen Peru und Mexiko. Amsterdam: Koninklijk Instituut voor de Tropen.
- Feriz, H. (1959). Ausgrabungen bei Parita (Provinz Herrera, República de Panamá). Zeitschrift für Ethnologie, (H. 1), 62–69.
- Feriz, H. (1959). Zeugnisse einer unbekannten vorkolumbischen Kultur in Panama. Umschau in Wissenschaft und Technik Journal, 23, 728–733.
- Feriz, H. (1959). Bericht Über eine Ausgrabung an der “Venado Beach” Panama-Kanal Zone. Wiener Völkerkundliche Mitteilungen, 5(2), 191–197.
- Feriz, H. (1960). Ecuador 1960; verslag van een studiereis. Amsterdam: Koninklijk Instituut voor de Tropen.
- Feriz, H. (1962). Een merkwaardige stenen kraal uit Suriname. Nieuwe West-Indische Gids/New West Indian Guide, 255–258.
- Feriz, H. (1964). Eine merkwürdige Tierplastik aus einem altindianischen Grab der «Linea Vieja», Costa Rica. Zeitschrift für Ethnologie, (H. 1), 43–50.
- Feriz, H. (1965). Die Darstellung einer Beschneidungsszene auf einem Goldschmuck aus Panama. Zeitschrift für Ethnologie, (H. 2), 293–294.
- Feriz, H. (1965). Warum hat der Regengott einen Rüssel? Zeitschrift für Ethnologie, (H. 1), 104–109.
- Feriz, H. (1966). Sinn und Bedeutung der erotischen Grabbeigaben in alt‐peruanischen Gräbern. Ethnos 31.1-4: 173-181.
- Feriz, H. (1966). Über artificielle Verbildungen des Nasenansatzes und der Stirnmitte bei den Maya. Zeitschrift für Ethnologie, (H. 2), 287–293.
- Feriz, H.P. (1966). «Alt-indianische Musikinstrumente aus Mittelamerika». In: Fritz Bose (ed.) (1966) Jahrbuch für musikalische Volks- und Völkerkunde, Berlin: Walter de Gruyter.

== Literature ==
- Krumbach, Helmut (1971). Hans P. Feriz † *23. 8. 1895 †31. 8. 1970. Zeitschrift Für Ethnologie, 96(2), 292–292.
- Lindeboom, G. A. (1984). “Feriz, Hans Paulus”, in: Dutch medical biography. A biographical dictionary of Dutch physicians and surgeons 1475-1975. Amsterdam: Rodopi, 1984.
- Manning, Roswitha (1984). Dr. Hans Feriz: persoon, collectie, publicaties. Wampum 1(1): 27-84.
- Manning, Roswitha (1988). Pre-Columbian Collections in Dutch Museums: Inventory and Historical Perspective, Amsterdam: Tropenmuseum.
- Müller, G. A. & Berger, M. E. (2024). Global Markets, Local Suppliers: Examining the Provenance of Archaeological Material from Southern Central America in Dutch Ethnographic Museums. transfer–Zeitschrift für Provenienzforschung und Sammlungsgeschichte| Journal for Provenance Research and the History of Collection, 3, 190-204.
- van Alphen, Richard & van Gessel, Herman (without publication date). "The Hans Feriz Collection. An Archaeological Collection at the Tropenmuseum". Google Arts & Culture. Retrieved 11 June 2026.

== Weblinks ==
- Objects collected by Hans Feriz in the online catalogue of the Wereldmuseum.
