= A. A. M. Stols =

Dutch publisher (1900–1973)

A.A.M. Stols
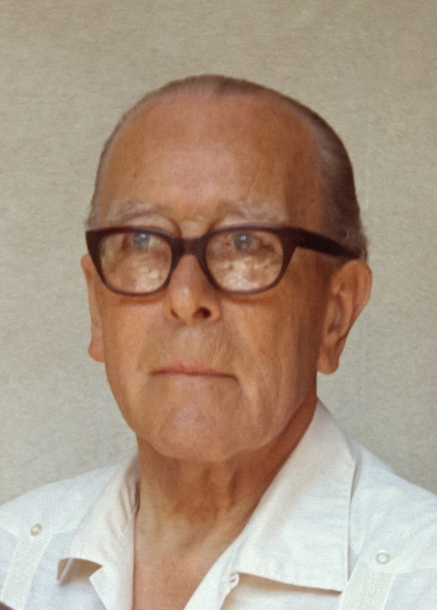
- A.A.M. Stols in 1971
- Born: January 28, 1900; Maastricht
- Died: 1973; Spain
- Occupations: Publisher, Printer
- Spouse: Margaretha Wilhelmina Kroesen
- Parents: Ludovicus Hubertus Alexander Stols (father); Alida Alphonsine Fermin (mother)

A. A. M. Stols (usually called Alexander or Sander, 1900–1973) was a Dutch printer and publisher, known best for his limited bibliophile editions of Dutch poetry.

== Biography ==
Stols was born in Maastricht, 28 January 1900. He was a son of Ludovicus Hubertus Alexander Stols (1870–1942), printer and publisher, and Alida Alphonsine Fermin (1874–1960); his father was the co-founder and co-owner of the Maastricht publishing house Boosten & Stols, which was later run by Sander's two younger brothers. In 1928 he married Margaretha Wilhelmina Kroesen (1908–2002). They had three children.

Stols finished the Hogere Burgerschool in 1917, and soon immersed himself in the local cultural world, becoming fascinated by books and joining a circle of friends including Charles Nypels, a typographer who had studied in Amsterdam under Sjoerd de Roos. The group combined a love for typography and books with a passion for art, especially French literature. At that time he began experimenting in his father's print shop, and his first printed book, a text from Joost van den Vondel, was printed with the assistance of Nypels. Having taken exams in Greek and Latin he went to Amsterdam to study law in 1919, with the ultimate goal of training to be an archivist, but never attained his degree.

=== Publishing career ===
Stols was a prolific publisher of many Dutch authors including Adriaan Roland Holst, J.C. Bloem, E. du Perron, J. Slauerhoff, Antoinette Hendrika Nijhoff-Wind, Simon Vestdijk, M. Vasalis, Jan van Nijlen, Karel Van de Woestijne, Gerrit Achterberg, and Marnix Gijsen, as well as French authors such as Valery Larbaud, Paul Valéry, and André Gide. Between 1922 and 1942 Stols published over 550 books, which were known for their attractive typography and design, with the assistance of Jan van Krimpen and later Helmut Salden. John Buckland Wright illustrated a number of his books.

In 1951, Stols left for Latin America where, until 1962, he worked for UNESCO in Ecuador, Guatemala, and Mexico. He established a friendship with Alfonso Reyes. In Mexico, Boudewijn Ietswaart was his assistant for two years. After a brief stay in the Netherlands, Stols returned to Mexico in 1963 where he worked until his retirement in 1965 as a cultural attaché at the embassy of The Netherlands. He then moved to Tarragona, Spain, where he died in 1973.
