= Een eerlijk zeemansgraf =

Volume of poetry by J. Slauerhoff

- Author: J. Slauerhoff
- Language: Dutch
- Genre: Poetry
- Publisher: Nijgh & Van Ditmar
- Publication date: 1936
- Publication place: Netherlands
- Preceded by: Soleares (1933)

Een eerlijk zeemansgraf ("An honest seaman's grave") is the last volume of poetry published by Dutch poet J. Slauerhoff before his death.

== Background and content ==
Slauerhoff's health had always been frail, and in October 1935 he was sick again, with malaria He was taken off his ship and brought to a hospital in Genoa. He spent time rehabilitating in Merano, Annecy, and Lausanne and by February 1936 fell ill again. He returned to the Netherlands, tenaciously hanging on to life in a nursing home in Hilversum but too weak to travel to a spa. He worked on Een eerlijk zeemansgraf in Hilversum, and wrote a note to fellow poet P. C. Boutens saying the volume's title was ominous. The collection indeed contains a poem called "Uitvaart" ("Funeral"), whose first draft he jotted down in his journal 12 years before, when he fell ill on his first sea journey.

== Publishing history ==
The collection was published (by Nijgh & Van Ditmar, Rotterdam) as Slauerhoff was in the nursing home in Hilversum, where he would die of malaria and tuberculosis on 5 October 1936. The book was reprinted in 1937 and 1954 (edited by Kees Lekkerkerker), and then again in 1985 for Nijgh & Van Ditmar's edition of Slauerhoff's poetry in individual volumes.

== Critical responses ==
Critic Kees Fens, in 1996, remembered that Een eerlijk zeemansgraf was, for him, the most engrossing of Slauerhoff's poems in part because it sketched a sailor's life so well. Fens loved the exotic names, and remarked that for Slauerhoff every port was his homeport as long as it wasn't a Dutch port.
