= Marlow Moss =

British artist (1889–1958)

- Moss in 1938
- Born: Marjorie Jewel Moss; 29 May 1889; Kilburn, London
- Died: 23 August 1958 (aged 69); Penzance, Cornwall
- Education: St John's Wood Art School, Slade School of Fine Art, Académie Moderne
- Known for: Painting
- Movement: Constructivism
- Partner: Antoinette Hendrika Nijhoff-Wind

Marjorie Jewel "Marlow" Moss (29 May 1889 – 23 August 1958) was the first British Constructivist artist; she worked in painting and sculpture.

== Biography ==
Moss was born on 29 May 1889 in Kilburn in London. She was the daughter of Lionel and Fannie Moss. She studied at St John's Wood Art School, the Slade School of Fine Art, and the Académie Moderne.

In her childhood, music was her one great interest, but her music studies were interrupted for years when she contracted tuberculosis. Later, Moss turned her attention to ballet. Around 1919, she changed her forename (from Marjorie) and adopted a masculine appearance. This was precipitated by a 'shock of an emotional nature' and the abandonment of her studies at the Slade, to live alone in Cornwall.

Moss was a pupil of Fernand Léger and Amédée Ozenfant at the Académie Moderne. She was associated with Piet Mondrian and they mutually influenced each other's use of the double line. She was a founding member of the Abstraction-Création association and was the only British artist to feature in all five annuals published by the group.

At the beginning of World War II, Moss left France to live near Lamorna Cove in Cornwall, studying architecture at the Penzance School of Art. For the rest of her life, she lived and worked in Cornwall, frequently visiting Paris. A neighbour, in Lamorna, described her as ″a dear little soul″ who used to give all the children of the village a Christmas present. The neighbour, when a child, used to peer into her studio to watch her paint,

... we'd see her pacing up and down, pacing, pacing. And then she would draw a straight line. Her work was all straight lines and cubes. Then she'd pace up and down again and then – uh, a square would be drawn.

Individual exhibitions of her work were staged by Erica Brausen in the Hanover Gallery in London in 1953 and 1958. Other exhibitions took place in the Stedelijk Museum, Amsterdam, in 1962 and in the Town Hall of Middleburg in Spring 1972.

Moss died on 23 August 1958 in Penzance.

== Collections ==
Moss's work is held in various collections, including the Rijksmuseum, MOMA, the Tate, the Centre Pompidou, the Israel Museum, the Stedelijk Museum Amsterdam, the Kröller-Müller Museum in Otterlo, and the Kunstmuseum Den Haag. Her work was included in the 2021 exhibition Women in Abstraction at the Centre Pompidou. In 2026, Marlow Moss: A Suitcase Full of Sketches was at the Kunstmuseum, The Hague and Creating Space: The Constructivist Marlow Moss at the Georg Kolbe Museum, Berlin.

== Writings ==
- Moss, Marjorie (1932). "[Puisque c'est le but de cet almanach d'introduire le public dans le domaine de l'art non-figuratif...]". Abstraction-création: Art non-figuratif (in French). 1: 26.
- Moss (1933). "[Quelle est l'influence des arbres sur ma peinture?]". Abstraction-création: Art non-figuratif (in French). 2: 29.
