= Herinnering aan Holland =

Dutch poem

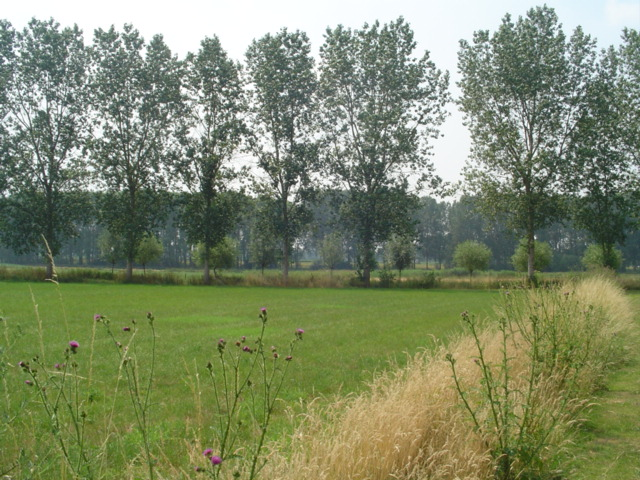
Dutch landscape with poplar trees, described in the second stanza of Marsman's poem

Herinnering aan Holland

Denkend aan Holland
zie ik breede rivieren
traag door oneindig
laagland gaan,

rijen ondenkbaar
ijle populieren
als hooge pluimen
aan den einder staan;

en in de geweldige
ruimte verzonken
de boerderijen
verspreid door het land,

boomgroepen, dorpen,
geknotte torens,
kerken en olmen
in een grootsch verband.

de lucht hangt er laag
en de zon wordt er langzaam
in grijze veelkleurige
dampen gesmoord,

en in alle gewesten
wordt de stem van het water
met zijn eeuwige rampen
gevreesd en gehoord.

— Hendrik Marsman

Herinnering aan Holland (English: Memory of Holland) is a poem written by Dutch poet Hendrik Marsman (1899–1940), first published in 1936. The poem describes the Dutch landscape and the Dutch struggle against the water. It is one of the best-known poems in the Dutch language.
