= Darja Collin =

Dutch ballet dancer

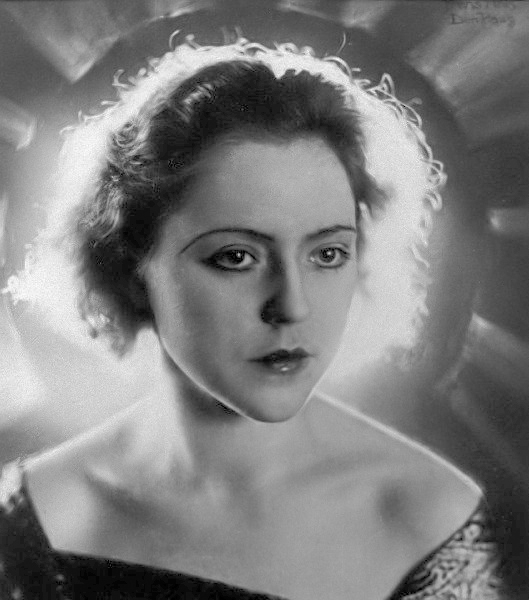
- Born: Maria Louisa Frederika Collin; November 19, 1902; Amsterdam, Kingdom of the Netherlands
- Died: March 28, 1967 (aged 64); Florence, Italy
- Occupations: Ballet dancer, actress
- Spouse: Jan Jacob Slauerhoff (m. 1930-1935)

Darja Collin (born Louisa Frederika Collin, November 19, 1902 - March 28, 1967) was a Dutch ballet dancer and teacher who has been considered one of the founders of Dutch modern dance.

== Personal life ==
Collin was born in Amsterdam, Netherlands to Robert Johan Carl Collin (1863-1904), a violinist and Wilhelmina Frederika Christina van Dijk on November 19, 1902. Collin married poet Jan Slauerhoff on September 3, 1930. The couple had one son who was stillborn. They divorced in 1935. In 1937 the engagement of Collin to James P. I. M. Corry was announced.

Collin died in Florence, Italy on March 28, 1967.

== Career ==
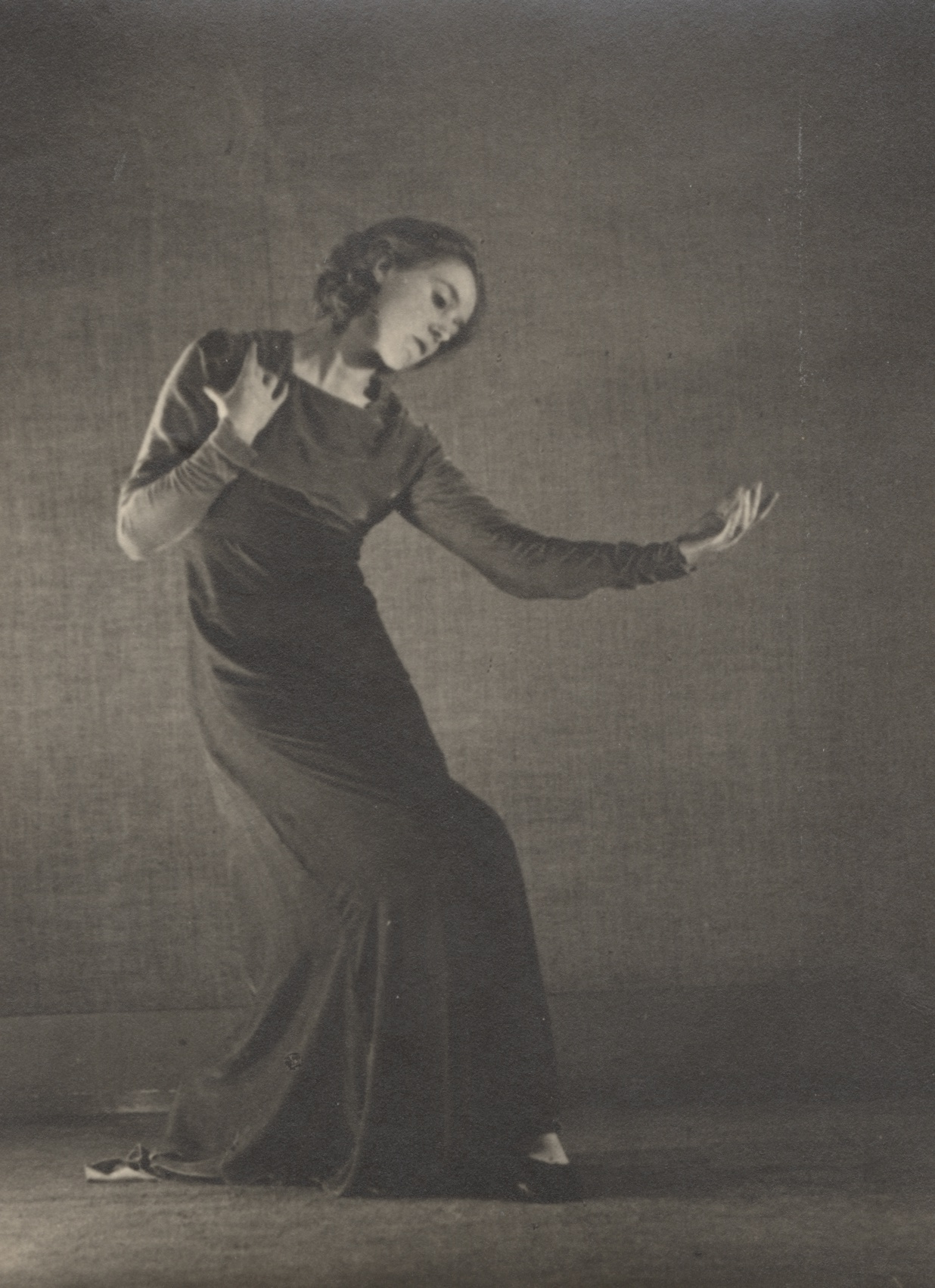
1930s image of Darja Collin

Collin's dance studies included both free movement dances and classical ballet. She studied classical ballet under Olga Preobrajenska and Vera Trefilova, as well as Mary Wigman, before making her debut in 1928. She became recognized in Europe, garnering nicknames such as the "Mata Hari of Dance". In 1933 she opened a dance school in The Hague.

During World War II Collin left Netherlands for Australia, where she established the Darya Collin Dance Troupe with Edmee Monod and Alison Lee, and performed for Dutch, American, and British troops. In 1947 Collin founded the Ballet van de Nederlandse Opera which initially was made up of 15 dancers, and in 1949 she became the director of the Netherlands Opera Ballet.

She retired from dancing in 1951, and then taught dancing at a school in Florence until she died in 1967.
