= Jan van Nijlen =

Belgian writer and poet

- Joannes Joannes-Baptista Maria Ignatius van Nijlen
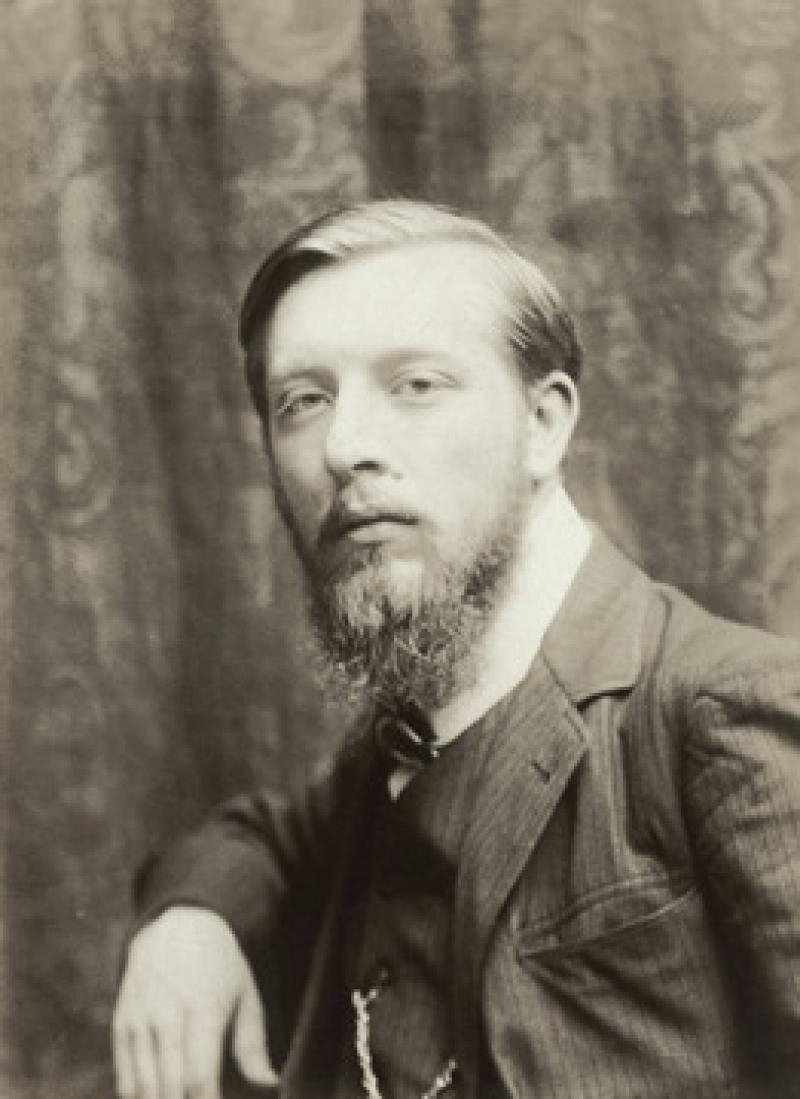
- Born: 10 November 1884; Antwerp, Belgium
- Died: 14 August 1965 (aged 80); Uccle, Belgium
- Occupations: poet, writer

Joannes Joannes-Baptista Maria Ignatius van Nijlen (10 November 1884 – 14 August 1965) was a Belgian writer and poet. He was born at Antwerp and died at Uccle.

== Bibliography ==
- Verzen (1906)
- Het licht (1909)
- Naar 't geluk (1911)
- Negen verzen (1914)
- Uren met Montaigne (1916)
- Francis Jammes (1918)
- Charles Péguy (1919)
- Het aangezicht der aarde (1923)
- De lokstem en andere gedichten (1924)
- Zeven gedichten (1925)
- De vogel Phoenix (1928)
- Geheimschrift (1934)
- Gedichten 1904-1938 (1938)
- Het oude kind (1938)
- De dauwtrapper (1947)
- Herinneringen aan E. du Perron (1955)
- Te laat voor deze wereld (1957)
- Druilende burgerij (1982)

== See also ==
- Flemish literature

== Sources ==
- Jan van Nijlen
- Jan Greshoff, Jan van Nijlen 1884–10 November - 1934 In: Forum. Jaargang 3 (1934)
- Stefan Van den Bossche, De wereld is zoo schoon waarvan wij droomen. Jan Van Nijlen, biografie, Lannoo, Tielt
