= Junior professional officer =

Junior professional officer (JPO) is a term used for young professionals usually under the age of 32 with an advanced university degree and a minimum of two years of professional experience. They are recruited at P1/P2 level by United Nations organizations. JPO positions are sponsored by participating donor governments, usually for a period of two to three years. Although the positions are funded by donor countries, the JPO is directly employed by the organization. JPOs are generally nationals of donor countries participating in the programme, and some donors such as the Netherlands and Switzerland also finance nationals of developing countries.

== Description ==
The Junior Professional Officer Programmes in the UN Common System recruit junior professional officers under bilateral agreements between the respective United Nations organizations, agencies, funds and programmes and donor countries. The programmes evolved from the United Nations’ Associate Experts (AE) programme (now UN JPO Programme), which was initiated by the Netherlands to provide additional support to the Food and Agriculture Organization (FAO) as well as training for young professionals. Other UN agencies and countries were encouraged to participate, and a UN system mandate was established under the United Nations Economic and Social Council (ECOSOC) resolution 849 (XXXII) of 4 August 1961. Today, the JPO Programme includes 30 UN Organizations and 30 donor countries.
