= Het verboden rijk =

Novel by J. Slauerhoff

Cover of the first edition

Het verboden rijk ("The forbidden kingdom") is a novel by Dutch author J. Slauerhoff (1898–1936). First published in 1931, the novel follows two narratives simultaneously—that of the Portuguese poet Luís de Camões, and that of a 20th-century Irishman, a radio operator and sailor. A sequel, Het leven op aarde ("Life on earth"), was published in 1933; a third book was planned but never finished.

== Plot ==
The novel's prologue tells of Antonio Farria, the Portuguese governor of a colony in China. Farria's settlement is destroyed by the Chinese, for which he blames the government back in Portugal, who have neglected the colony. After taking revenge on a Chinese city Farria founds what will become Portuguese Macau, which was to act as a thorn in the side of the Portuguese but, in the end, remained loyal to Portugal. The narrative proper begins with a semi-historical account of Luís de Camões, the 16th-century Portuguese poet who wrote the epic poem Os Lusíadas. In Slauerhoff's novel, Camões flees Portugal after an affair with a woman destined to marry the Portuguese crown prince.

In the meantime the government in Macau is challenged by a merchant, Pedro Velho, who seeks rapprochement with the Chinese. A clever ruse by the governor and his accomplices makes Velho leave the colony for the hinterland. Pilar, the daughter of governor Farria by a Chinese woman, flees a forced marriage and is thought to take refuge in a Dominican friary. Camões's ship is wrecked off the coast of Macau, and when he lands, still holding his epic poem, Camões ends up in the garden home of a ruined estate where he discovers Pilar. A vision of his Portuguese lover merges with the half-Chinese woman, who is living as a Chinese in the house of her former nurse. Pilar helps Camões recover his health, but when he leaves to investigate a fire (the governor had the monastery burned down) he is arrested.

The second strand, a first-person narrative, is of the 20th-century radio operator, a short, swarthy Irishman who thinks he is descended from a sailor stranded after the Spanish Armada. He remains nameless; in Het leven op aarde he is called Cameron. His life spirals downward after a shipwreck. Addicted to drugs he takes again to the sea on a run-down cargo ship. The freedom offered at sea fails to satisfy him and he longs to be taken over by a higher power.

After torture, which he endures by taking narcotics, Camões is allowed to return to writing but in his poetry reveals Pilar's hiding place. He is punished by being sent on a trade mission to Beijing and on departure sees her again, now standing next to her intended husband. The mission is a fiasco, and Camões returns alone. He assaults a Chinese farmer and steals the man's clothes.

The radio operator's story continues: he finds himself in a garden home where he thinks he's been before. References abound linking Camões to the Irishman, who feels as if he is being taken over by another. Later, his ship is attacked near Hong Kong by pirates and the crew abducted and taken deep into China, where he finds clothes containing gold coins— here, Camões and the Irishman merge.

In the final chapter the Irishman, paying for passage to Macao with 16th-century gold coins, finds himself defending the church of old Macau with Dominican friars against an invading army. It turns out that Camões had returned from his expedition to save the settlement. Pilar gives Camões his poem back, but again he is exiled. Before the Irishman sets sail to Hong Kong, he trails the half-Chinese daughter of a Portuguese governor. He is despondent since he was unable to help or harbor the spirit of the other who sought refuge in him. His final plan is to go straight into China, from Shanghai.

== Textual history ==
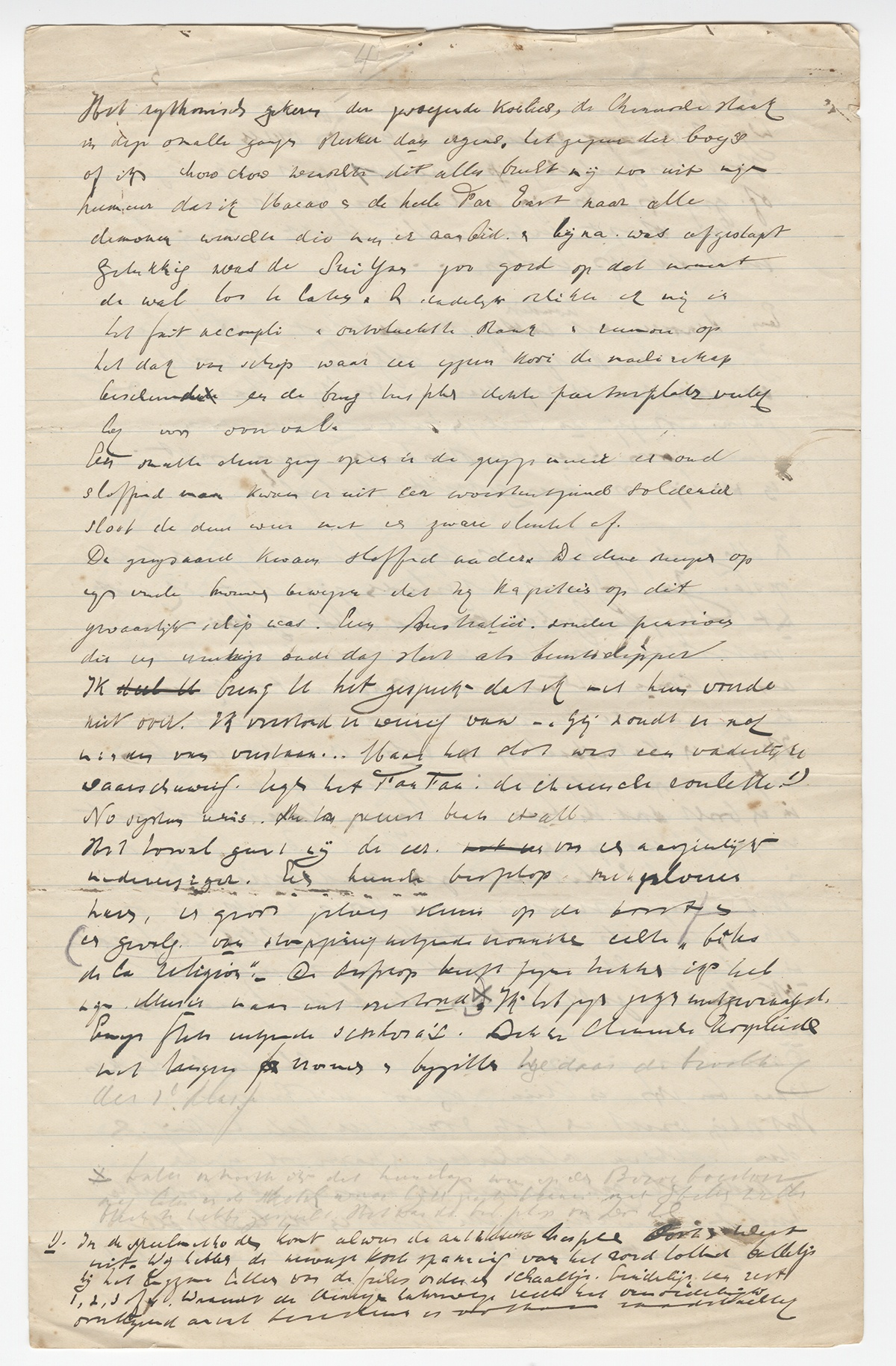
Manuscript

The novel was first published serially in the literary magazine Forum, starting in the magazine's first issue, November 1931. The ninth issue of the magazine, September 1932, contained the last section, and by November 1932 Het verboden rijk was for sale in the bookstore (published by Nijgh & Van Ditmar), with minor corrections and one major excision. Following editions had more editorial changes, mostly minor. The excision is a passage detailing an affair between the Camões character and the princess who is betrothed to the Portuguese crown prince.

In 1985, the contents of a "seaman's chest" full of notes pertaining to the two "Cameron novels", edited by W. Blok and Kees Lekkerkerker, was published by the Nederlands Letterkundig Museum en Documentatiecentrum. The manuscripts offer insight into the genesis of the novels and presents material related to the never-published third volume: Slauerhoff intended a trilogy.

=== Importance for Forum ===
Forum was the literary magazine founded and edited by Menno ter Braak, Edgar du Perron, and Maurice Roelants. Though it was published only from 1932 to 1935 its influence on Dutch literature was great. Of all fiction writers who published in the magazine, Slauerhoff contributed the largest number of pages (with Simon Vestdijk in second place); besides Het verboden rijk and Het leven op aarde he also contributed two short stories.

== Criticism and legacy ==
Many contemporary reviews were negative. Martinus Nijhoff, writing for De Gids, recognized the motifs of some of Slauerhoff's "beautiful poems", but thought the novel was careless and confused. Some critics, apparently expecting a traditional historical novel, were confused or appalled by the mixing of the two narratives; for at least one reviewer (Anton van Duinkerken) criticism of the novel's form was an extension of his critique of Forum, which was known for its formal experiments. Others (especially Roman Catholic reviewers) disagreed vehemently with what they saw as a kind of moral nihilism. K. H. Heeroma saw the two protagonists as rejected by Western society and concluded that the novel was written in the spirit of vitalism. He said the novel was one of the most curious of the year, full of impossibilities and written carelessly, though written by an "original" author.

The novel did not fare better with readers than it did with critics; it was not reprinted until after the Second World War. The first reprint was in Slauerhoff's 1945 Collected Works, edited by Kees Lekkerkerker; until 1976 it was reprinted six times, and once more in a Collected Prose volume (1975). It ranks as #109 in the Canon of Dutch Literature (Slauerhoff occupying #27 among authors). It was translated into English by Paul Vincent as The Forbidden Kingdom, published by Pushkin Press.
