= Antoinette Hendrika Nijhoff-Wind =

Dutch writer

Antoinette Hendrika "A.H." Nijhoff-Wind (9 June 1897 – 22 May 1971) was a Dutch writer. She provided a meeting place for artists at her home in the hamlet of Little Valkenisse at Biggekerke.

== Biography ==
A. H. Nijhoff-Wind was born Antoinetta "Netty" Hendrika Wind in The Hague. In 1916 she married poet Martinus Nijhoff but they only lived together for a couple of years. Their son Faan Nijhoff, real name Wouter Stefan Nijhoff, was born in 1916 in Breda. Later he was to study photography in Paris under Man Ray and worked under the name Stephen Storm.

In 1920 Nijhoff-Wind moved to Italy to manage a boarding house at Settignano with her lover Maria Tesi; from this experience she wrote The Four Deaths.

In 1929 Nijhoff-Wind moved to Paris and there she met British visual artist Marlow Moss, who would become her lover.

After World War II, Nijhoff-Wind reunited with Marlow Moss and they lived alternately in The Hague, with her husband Martinus Nijhoff, and in Cornwall, where Moss had a studio near Lamorna Cove.

After the death of Martinus Nijhoff in 1953, she settled in the hamlet of Little Valkenisse at Biggekerke, which she inherited from her husband. The house continued to be a meeting place for artists.

She died on 21 March 1971 and is buried in the cemetery of Biggekerke. On the tomb is an image created by Marlow Moss.
