= Hendrik Marsman =

Dutch poet and writer (1899–1940)

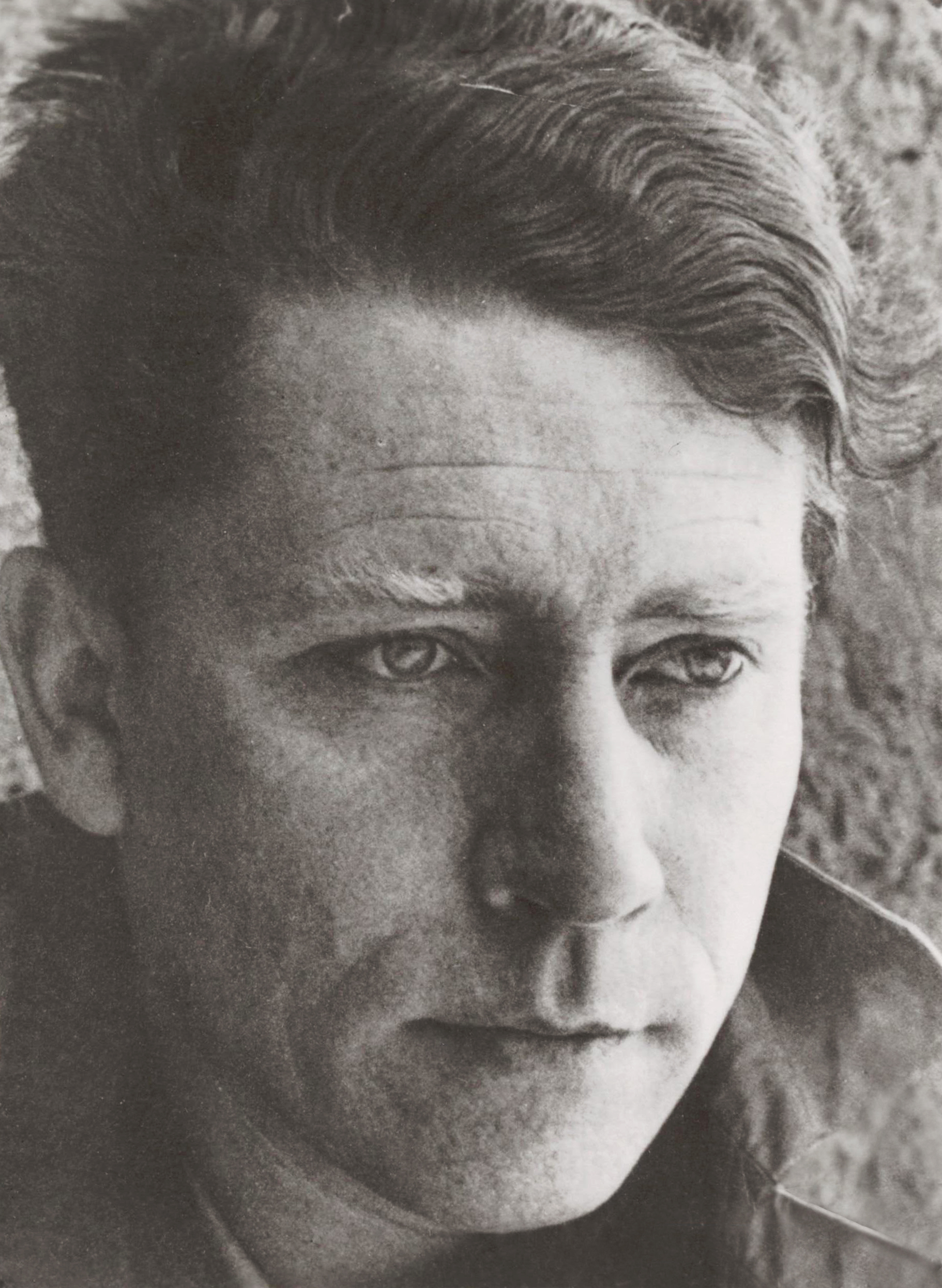
- Marsman in the 1930s
- Born: 30 September 1899; Zeist, Netherlands
- Died: 21 June 1940 (aged 40); Bay of Biscay

Hendrik Marsman (30 September 1899 – 21 June 1940) was a Dutch poet and writer. He died while escaping to Great Britain, when the ship he was sailing on, the S.S. Berenice, either suffered a fatal engine-room explosion, or was torpedoed by a German submarine which mistook Berenice for another vessel.

== Biography ==
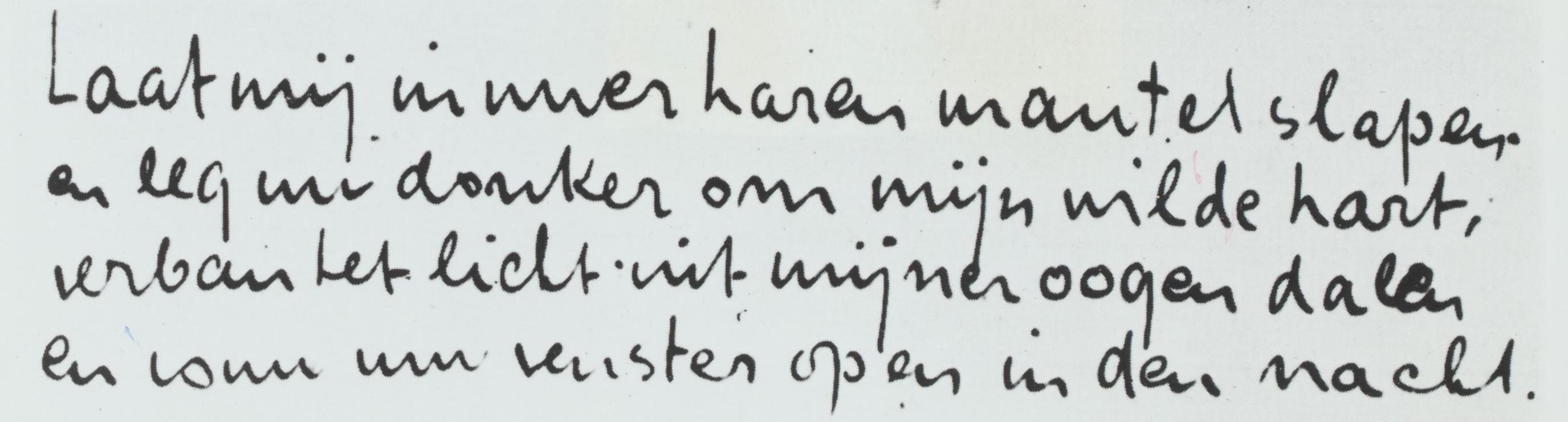
Autograph of the poem Invocatio

Marsman studied law and practised in Utrecht, but after 1933 he travelled in Europe and devoted himself to literature. Under the influence of the German Expressionists, Marsman made his literary debut about 1920 with rhythmic free verse, which attracted notice for its aggressive independence.

In the biography of Hendrik Marsman on the website of the Dutch Literary Museum Charley Toorop is mentioned as one of the women who had a relationship with Marsman before he married in 1929 his wife Rien Barendregt.

The collection Verzen (1923; "Verses") expresses an antihumanist, anti-intellectual rebelliousness, which the poet called "vitalism." As editor of the periodical De Vrije bladen ("The Free Press"), he became in 1925 the foremost critic of the younger generation. His next collection of verse appeared in 1927 with the English title Paradise Regained and was greeted as a major artistic achievement. Another cycle, Porta Nigra, dominated by the idea of death, appeared in 1934. His last book of verse, Tempel en kruis (1940; "Temple and Cross"), an autobiographical account of the poet's development, reaffirms humanistic ideals. After obtaining a Portuguese visa in Bordeaux, France, on June 18, 1940 from the Consul-General Aristides de Sousa Mendes, Marsman boarded a ship bound for England. He drowned three days later when the ship sunk after an explosion in the English Channel. His wife survived as the only passenger.

His poetry is vitalistic and expressionistic, and (fear of) death, as a metaphor for defeat in life, is a recurring theme. His "Herinnering aan Holland" (Remembrance of Holland): "Denkend aan Holland zie ik breede rivieren traag door oneindig laagland gaan" ("Thinking about Holland, I see broad rivers slowly moving through endless lowlands"). In 2000, the Dutch people chose this as the "Dutch Poem of the Century."

== Awards ==
- 1927 - Prijs van Amsterdam (Amsterdam Award) for Paradise regained
- 1936 - Lucy B. and C.W. van der Hoogt Prize for Porta Nigra

== Death ==
Hendrik Marsman died on board the ship S.S. Berenice that sunk in the Bay of Biscay in the early morning of 21 June 1940.

The ship had set sailing from Bordeaux and sank in the North Sea. Different accounts exist on what might have sunk the S.S. Berenice.

The narrative according to the National Library of the Netherlands, that keeps an archive on Hendrik Marsman, goes like this:

In the early morning of 21 June 1940 S.S. Berenice, sailing from Bordeaux, sank in the North Sea due to an explosion in the engine-room and not, as the persistent rumour goes, as the result of a well-aimed German torpedo.

On a website dedicated to German submarines (U-boats) the sinking of the S.S. Berenice by the German submarine U-65 is detailed to the minute, although with some leeway for controversy: the U-boat might have accidentally; due to fog; attacked the S.S. Berenice confusing it with another ship: the "Champlain".

"According to the [log] of U-65, they sighted a big steamer, identified as Champlain (28.124 grt), at 5.45 hours, which was shadowed until 7.35 hours, when the U-boat lost contact in fog. A short time later the ship was sighted again and attacked with a spread of three torpedoes at 8.17 hours. Allied sources reports that the Champlain went to the bottom after being damaged by an air laid magnetic mine off La Pallice at 09.30 hours on 17 June. In knowledge of these sources, the torpedo report of U-65 claims the Champlain as his own success, but date, time and position are well fitting with the loss of the Berenice."

After presenting by email a librarian of the Royal Dutch Library with the rather confusing stories regarding the "S.S. Berenice" this reply was received:

According to the biography of the poet Marsman by Jaap Goedegebuure [...] it took Dutch historians 45 years to establish that the Berenice was not hit by a torpedo from the U65. An attack one day later was confused with the explosion on the Berenice. Source for the biography on this matter was a 1986 history of Dutch merchant shipping by historian Karel Bezemer (Geschiedenis van de Nederlandse koopvaardij in de Tweede Wereldoorlog). In Holland the U-boat-attack on the Berenice is considered to be a persistent myth, stimulated by his widow and admirers of the poet who wanted his death to be more heroic.

The only surviving passenger was Marsman's wife Rien Barendregt. She was saved because at the time of the explosion she was on deck serving breakfast while wearing a life jacket and the explosion threw her overboard. She told captain Groenhof of the boat ("Nettie") that picked her and the few survivors up about her husband [that] "He could no longer hold on". The article in the Dutch newspaper Trouw that covers the history of the boat "Nettie" goes under the suggestive title "Marsman kon niet meer op ms 'Nettie' wachten" which translates as "Marsman could no longer wait for the ship 'Nettie'".

According to the same article (in Dutch) no manuscript or body was recovered after the explosion.

In poems including "Vrees" ('Fear'), describing "the moment that the bullet won't miss", "Zinkend ship" ('Sinking ship'), "De Overtocht" (The Passage [by boat]) some see signs of Henrik Marsman predicting his own moment of dying and his fear "dat de dood het einde niet is" ('that dead is not the end'). In "Verzet" ('Resistance') Marsman pictures the last moments of a dying man using his last grain of energy to fight off a priest holding a crucifix in front of him with the kick and the scream "Mijn zonden gaan mee in Mijn graf" ('My sins go with me in My grave').

An on-line published biography (in Dutch) mentions six poems that seem to predict the way Marsman died. Only a verse of the poem "Maannacht" ('Moon Night') is used there as illustration.

== Bibliography ==
=== in English ===
- Hendrik Marsman: A Crooked Flower in Cosmos' Flailing Mouth. 12 poems translated by Terzij de Horde, 2015. No ISBN
- Paul F. Vincent: Translation of 'Herinnering aan Holland'. Utrecht, Bucheliuspers, 2007. No ISBN
- James Dickey: The Zodiac. Garden City, N.Y., Doubleday, 1976. (Based on the poem 'The zodiac' by H. Marsman). No ISBN
- H. Marsman: 'Poetry'. In: The literary review, vol. 5 (1961), no. 2, pag. 193

=== in Dutch ===
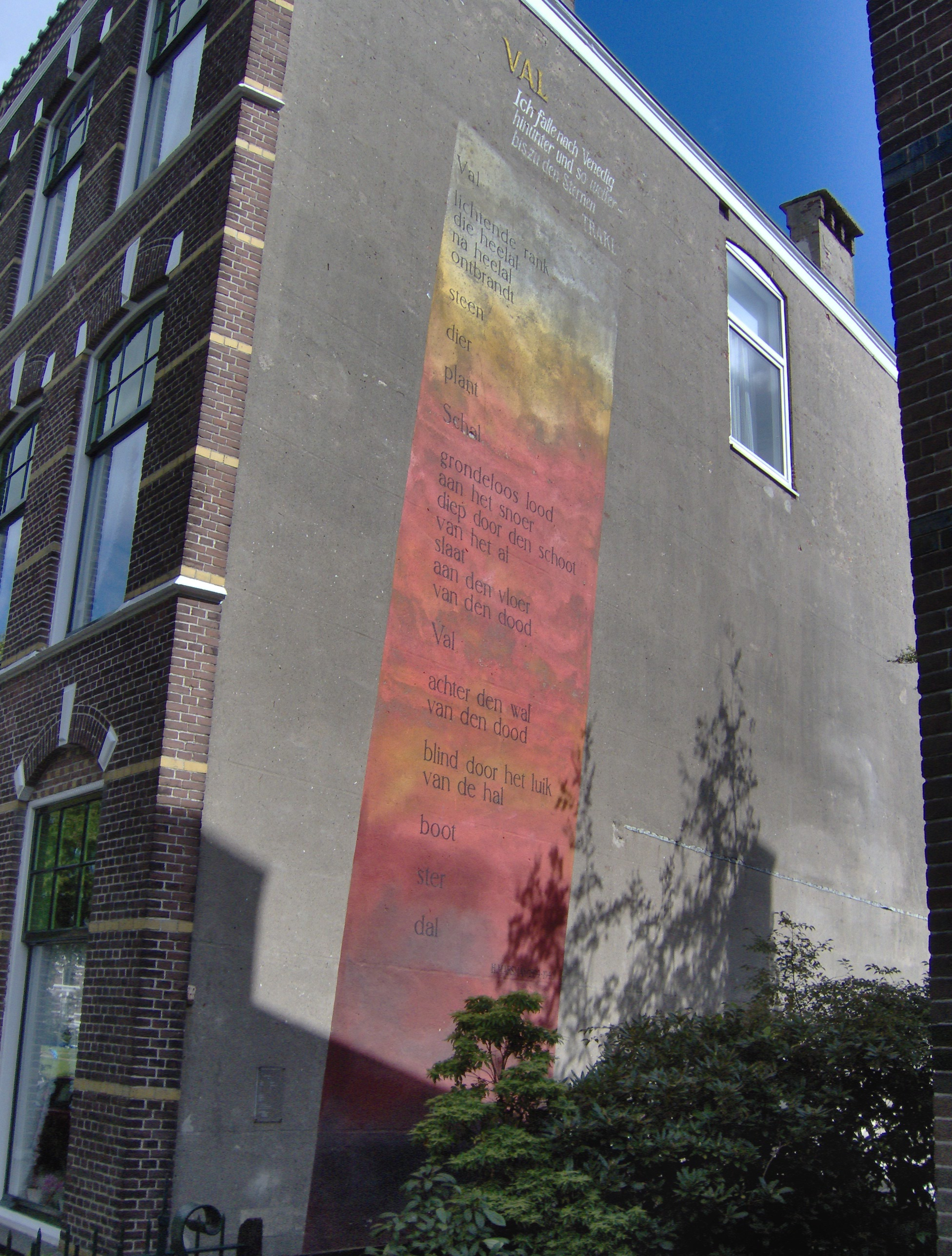
Wall poems in Leiden: Marsman's poem Val

- 1923 - Verzen (poems)
- 1925 - Penthesileia (poems)
- 1926 - De anatomische les (essay)
- 1927 - De vliegende Hollander
- 1927 - Gerard Bruning. Nagelaten werk
- 1927 - Nagelaten werk (essay)
- 1927 - Paradise Regained
- 1928 - De lamp van Diogenes
- 1929 - De vijf vingers
- 1930 - Witte vrouwen (poems)
- 1931 - Kort geding (essay)
- 1931 - Voorpost (poems)
- 1933 - De dood van Angèle Degroux (novel)
- 1933 - Tegenonderzoek
- 1934 - Porta Nigra (poems)
- 1935 - De immoralist (of André Gide) (translation)
- 1936 - Heden ik, morgen gij (with Simon Vestdijk) (novel)
- 1937 - Herman Gorter (essay)
- 1938 - Critisch proza
- 1938-1947 - Verzameld werk (collected works)
- 1939 - Menno ter Braak (essay)
- 1939 - Hieronymus, de dichter der vriendschap (of Teixeira de Pascoaes) (translation, with Albert Vigoleis Thelen)
- 1939 - Paulus de dichter Gods (of Teixeira de Pascoaes) (translation, with Albert Vigoleis Thelen)
- 1940 - Tempel en kruis (poems)
- 1941 - Aldus sprak Zarathoestra (of Friedrich Nietzsche) (translation, with Ed Coenraards)
- 1945 - Brieven over literatuur (with Simon Vestdijk)
- 1946 - Verbum obscurum (of Teixeira de Pascoaes) (translation, with Albert Vigoleis Thelen)

== Poem Berlijn (1922) ==
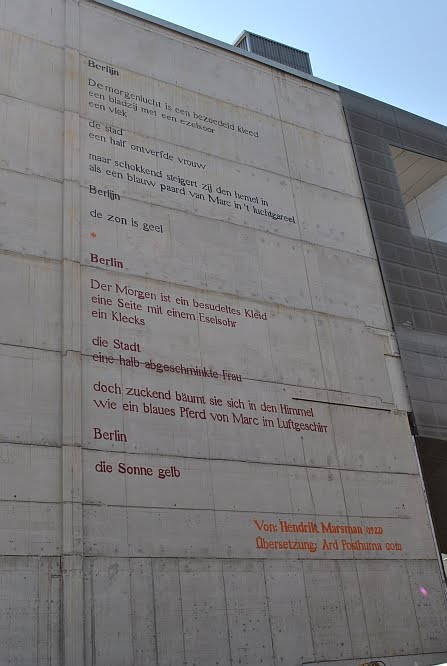
Marsman's poem Berlijn as a wall poem in Berlin

Marsman's poem "Berlijn" is painted on an exterior wall of the Dutch Embassy in Berlin, both in the original Dutch and in German translation (a further English translation is supplied below):

De morgenlucht is een bezoedeld kleed
een bladzij met een ezelsoor
een vlek

de stad
een half ontverfde vrouw

maar schokkend steigert zij den hemel in
als een blauw paard van Marc in 't luchtgareel

Berlijn

de zon is geel

Der Morgen ist ein besudeltes Kleid
eine Seite mit einem Eselsohr
ein Klecks

die Stadt
eine halb abgeschminkte Frau

doch zuckend bäumt sie sich in den Himmel
wie ein blaues Pferd von Marc im Luftgeschirr

Berlin

die Sonne gelb

The morning is a stained dress
a dog-eared page
a stain

the city
a woman with makeup half-off

but startling she rears into the sky
like a blue horse by Marc in a harness of air

Berlin

the sun is yellow
