= Yann Lovelock =

English writer and translator (born 1939)

Yann Lovelock BEM (born 11 February 1939) is an English writer and translator who later became a Buddhist interfaith worker.

== Literary career ==
Yann Lovelock was born in Birmingham on 11 February 1939. His career as a poet, editor and reviewer began while he was studying at St Edmund Hall, Oxford. For the most part his writing appeared from small presses and in little magazines. He was associated in particular with Peter Mortimer's Iron, Nick Toczek's The Little Word Machine, and Ian Robinson's Oasis, all of which he helped edit. In Europe he served as vice-chair of Freundkreis Poesie Europe (Frankfurt am Main, 1977–97) and was English editor of its literary annual. As a critic and translator, his main specialisation was in the poetry of the Low Countries and he was commissioned to write a study of modern Dutch poetry in translation, The Line Forward (1984). Among Dutch-language poets he helped edit and translate have been Guido Gezelle, Anton van Wilderode, Hugo Claus, Willem Roggeman, nl:Stefaan van den Bremt and H.C. ten Berge. His allied interest was in modernist poetry in Belgian Romance dialects, of which he edited and translated two anthologies, The Colour of the Weather (1980) and In the Pupil's Mirror (1997). In 1995 he was elected a corresponding member of the Belgian "dialect academy", La Société de Langue et de Littérature Wallonnes. During the 1970s he was commissioned by UNESCO to co-translate several works from Eastern languages. Later translations have included selections from Marianne Larsen (Denmark), Gilles Cyr (Quebec) and Serge Pey (France).

== Buddhist and interfaith involvement ==
The other side of Lovelock's life centred on his involvement with Buddhism. Between 1982 and 2005 he was responsible for the educational outreach and interfaith work of Birmingham Buddhist Vihara; afterwards he served as Secretary to Birmingham Maha Vihara. With Ajahn Khemadhammo, he co-founded the Buddhist Prison Chaplaincy Organisation in 1984 and served as its Co-ordinator until 1995. Since 2002 his national involvement in multi-faith activities has included serving on the executives of the National Association of Standing Advisory Councils on Religious Education and of The Inter Faith Network; as interfaith co-ordinator for the Network of Buddhist Organisations; and as Buddhist vice-chair of the Council of Dharmic Faiths. At regional level he was vice-chair of the West Midlands Faiths Forum and served as alternate faith member on the West Midlands Regional Assembly. In 2012 he was awarded the British Empire Medal for his services to community cohesion and inter-faith relations in the West Midlands. Between 2012-2014, Lovelock was part of the editorial team of The Encyclopedia of Buddhist Arts at the Fo Guang Shan main monastery in Taiwan. There he had special responsibility for the four volumes devoted to sculpture, and in April 2019 took part in the encyclopedia's academic presentation during the "Expressions of the Dharma" conference at Hsi Lai Temple, Los Angeles. After leaving Birmingham at the end of 2017 to move to Hagley, Worcestershire, Lovelock joined Hagley Parish Council, where he became Deputy Lead for the Environment, and later joined Hagley U3A as its Secretary as well.

== Bibliography ==
=== General ===
- The Vegetable Book, an Unnatural History, Allen & Unwin, London, 1972. ISBN 978-0-04-581008-6
- Folk Tales of Ancient Persia (with Forough Hekmat), Caravan Books, New York City, 1974. ISBN 978-0-88206-001-9
- The Line Forward: a Survey of Modern Dutch Poetry in English Translation, Bridges Books, Amsterdam, NL, 1984. ISBN 978-90-70306-09-0
- Dhammatalaka Peace Pagoda – a Guide, Birmingham Buddhist Vihara, 2006.

=== Poetry ===
- Short Circuit, Aquila, Isle of Skye, Scotland, 1975. ISBN 978-0-903226-82-0
- City & Beyond, Rivelin Press, Sheffield, 1976. ISBN 978-0-904524-13-0
- Strangers in Amber, Tangent Books, London, 1976. ISBN 978-0-904945-02-7
- The Grid (prose poems), Sow’s Ear 2, Stafford, 1983
- Building Jerusalem, Rivelin Press, Bradford, 1984. ISBN 978-0-904524-48-2
- A Scattering Folder, Platform Poets 25, Middleton St George, 1985. ISBN 978-0-905917-15-3
- Blue Cubes for a Catarrh, Oasis, London, 1990. ISBN 978-0-903375-81-8
- The Haiku Pavement, Tern Press, Market Drayton, 1990.
- Landscape with Voices, Poems 1980–95, University of Salzburg, Austria, 1995. ISBN 978-3-7052-0433-1
- Aquarelles, Raunchland Publications, Dunfermline, Scotland, 1995.
- Inheriting Hawkstone, Tern Press, Market Drayton, 1999.

=== Translations ===
- Gipsy Wharf, by Jasim Uddin (with Barbara Painter), Allen & Unwin, London, 1969. OCLC 221172070
- Padma River Boatman, by Manik Bandopadhyaya (with Barbara Painter), University of Queensland Press, St Lucia, Australia, 1973. ISBN 978-0-7022-0833-1
- Radha's Lotus: Love-poems from the Bengali (with Barbara Painter), Issue 9 of Platform/Green Horse booklet, Winchester, 1975.
- Bhai Vir Singh, Poet of the Sikhs (with Gurbachan Singh Talib and Harbans Singh), Motilal Banarsidas, Delhi, India, 1976.
- Melanthika: an Anthology of Pan-Caribbean Writing (edited with Philip Nanton and Nick Toczek; translations from Spanish and French by Yann Lovelock), Little Word Machine, Birmingham, UK, 1977. ISBN 978-0-905393-00-1
- The Colour of the Weather An anthology of Walloon poetry edited and translated by Yann Lovelock. The Menard Press, London, 1980. ISBN 978-0-903400-47-3
- The Sign of the Hamster, by Hugo Claus (with Theo Hermans and others), Leuvense Schrijversaktie, Louvain, Belgium, 1986. ISBN 978-90-71345-13-5
- A Vanishing Emptiness, selected poems of Willem Roggeman (edited by Yann Lovelock, translations by Yann Lovelock, Theo Hermans and others), Forest Books, London, 1989. ISBN 978-0-948259-51-7
- A Townscape of Flanders, by Anton van Wilderode (with photographs by Jan Decreton), Lanoo, Tilt, Belgium, 1990. ISBN 978-90-209-1866-3
- The White Shaman, Poems by H.C. ten Berge (edited by Theo Hermans; Yann Lovelock co-translator), Forest Books, London, 1991. ISBN 978-1-85610-004-5
- In The Pupil's Mirror, Modern Walloon Poetry from Belgium, Iron Press, Northumberland, 1997. ISBN 978-0-906228-65-4
- A Common Language: Selected Poems by Marianne Larsen (edited with Anne Born, various other translators), Oversteps, Devon, 2006. ISBN 978-0-9552424-2-7
- The Graph of Roads: Selected Poems of Gilles Cyr 1968–1999 (edited by Patrick Williamson, some translations and an afterword by Yann Lovelock) Guernica Editions, Ontario, Canada, 2008
- Every Poem is a Decapitated [sic] Head Held up by a Single Hair, poems by Serge Pey (translated with Patrick Williamson), online publication from The Red Ceilings Press, UK, 2011

=== Others ===
- Not Comforts//But Vision – essays on the poetry of George Oppen, Interim Press, Budleigh Salterton, UK, 1985.

"In the Interstices of Indra's Net: a setting for the poetry of George Oppen", pp. 71–83.

- Cross Roads (by Bert Schierbeek), Katydid Books, Rochester, US. 1988. ISBN 978-0-942668-11-7

"Introduction", pp. 13–20

- Formentera & the Gardens of Suzhou (by Bert Schierbeek), Guernica, Toronto, Canada, 1989. ISBN 978-0-920717-00-4

"Afterword – The Tao of Bert Schierbeek", pp. 81–86

- Translation In Performance – papers on the theory and practice of translation, Department of Modern Languages, University of Bradford, UK, 1990. ISSN 0261-0353

"Translating the Untranslatable", pp. 188–213.

- Emotional Geology – the writings of Brian Louis Pearce, Stride, Exeter, UK, 1993. ISBN 978-1-873012-63-5

"Pearce Thru His Places", pp. 42–50

- Physic Meet & Metaphysic: a celebration on Edward Lowbury’s 80th birthday, University of Salzburg, Austria, 1993. ISBN 978-3-7052-0805-6

"Furor Apollonis: an occupational disease", pp. 130–52

- The Edges of Light (selected poems of Hélène Dorion), Guernica, Toronto, Canada, 1995. ISBN 978-0-920717-95-0

"Postface – Fixing the Fractions", pp. 97–105

- The Road to Parnassus, Homage to Peter Russell on his 75th Birthday, University of Salzburg, Austria, 1996. ISBN 978-3-7052-0290-0

"Bluejeans & Gown": The Beat scene in Oxford, 1959–62, pp. 477–492.

- Summoning the Sea: a literary festschrift for James Hogg, University of Salzburg, Austria, 1996. ISBN 978-3-7052-0050-0

"Do vête, do nwâr: Movements of renewal in Belgian dialect poetry in the 19th and 20th centuries", pp. 266–279.

- The Mystical Tradition and the Carthusians, Vol. 5, University of Salzburg, Austria, 1996. ISBN 978-3-7052-0448-5

”The Wheel of Generation: some notes on the spread of the doctrine of reincarnation”, pp. 153–167

- Various articles in The Babel Guide to Dutch & Flemish Fiction in English Translation, Oxford, UK, 2001. ISBN 978-1-899460-80-9
- Les Dialectes de Wallonie 29–30 (Mélanges en hommage à Jean Lechanteur), Liège, Belgium, 2003. ISSN 0773-7688

"A l’autre côté du tunnel le TGV ralentit : de la traduction des dialectes belges", pp. 307–316

- Meeting Buddhists, Christians Aware, Leicester, 2004, ISBN 978-1-873372-23-4

"The Origin and Symbolism of a Buddhist Pagoda", pp. 150–154
