= Sojan Badiar Ghat =

- Author: Jashim Uddin
- Illustrator: Hashem Khan
- Language: Bengali
- Subject: Love & End
- Genre: Poem
- Publication date: 1933
- Publication place: Bangladesh
- Media type: Printed Poetry
- Pages: 162

Sojan Badiyar Ghat (Bengali: সোজন বাদিয়ার ঘাট, lit. 'Sojan Gypsy's Wharf'), also translated in English as Gypsy Wharf, by Jasim Uddin, a leading poet of Bengali literature, is a book of Bengali poetry, written and published in 1933. The main characters are Sojan, the son of a Muslim farmer, and Duli, the daughter of Namu tribe.

== Characters ==
Duli is presented as a Hindu, daughter of Gadai from the Namu tribe. The girl has a unique and beautiful face. The poet says, "Had she worn jewelry of gold or silver, they would have been a disgrace to her beauty." Duli is spontaneous. She picks rattan fruits and wild flowers, breaks fruit pulses and spends her day with the village patrol. Occasionally she would pretend-play with her dolls and arrange 'doll weddings', inviting teenage girls to join her game. Her best partner in these things is a Muslim boy named Sojan. He is the son of Samir Saikh. Sojan is also a different version of Duli. The whole day, he wanders in the forest searching for fruit and looking for birds' nests. There is no more information about his form, but it is mentioned that his head is full of by mane hairs.

== Storyline ==
There are total six episodes in the poetry "Sojan Badiyar Ghat". Poet Jasim Uddin named the episodes Namur Kalo Meye (Namus's Black Girl), Nir (Nest), Polayon (Fleeing), Purbo-rag (Previous Spleen), Beder Bahar (Gypsy's Fleet), Beder Beshati (Gypsy's Trading).

== Theme ==
Two communities, Hindus and Muslims, live in Shimultali village. The two distinct communities have more than fraternity. When someone dies in the Muslim house, the lamps are burnt on the floor of the Hindu house for him. Again, when the boy was sick in Hindu house, the Muslim Pir was said for him. In a word, the villagers are mutually supportive. Gadai Moral's daughter, Duli, wanders through the whole village. Her friend Sojan, is the son of Samir Sheikh's of the same village. During childhood, they played together.

Once upon a time, Muslims of Shimultali beat Shimultali's Maharram ceremony and Muslims in the neighboring village by doing so. When they went to Judge Naib Moshae, Hindu Naib stripped the people of his own community in retaliation. And to the innocent Muslims of Shimultali. But the Shimultali Hindus declined to take vengeance on Muslims similar to their brotherly Shimultali Muslims. By doing this, Hindu Naib encouraged revenge with the deviration of the gods of Hindus. The Muslims of Hindus have already received news of the Muslims, so they fled to the dear village in the dark of the night. But the Muslims never realised that the Hindus had fled to the village.

At one stage, the boys and daughters are big in the eyes of the society and Duli's married elsewhere. Then Duli realized that she could not leave her childhood game's partner Sojan. She said, 'if you want to cut off the crazy foliage, they will not be able to distribute everyone'. Then, on the day of her marriage, Duli called her peer Sojan and explained everything. Even if it matches itself, Sojan tries to convince Duli, thinking about his family, community. And when Duli is afraid of witnessing the sky-air, he does not have anything to do so.

In this way, the novel (poetry) of rural poet's started with the tragedy and connection of religion, society, love, humanity, joy and pain. But society considers two adolescents' love more of a crime than communal conflict.

== English translation ==
The English version of "Sojan Badiar Ghat" was published on 1 January 1970. Barbara Painter and Yan lovelock two writers are published the translations book of its "Gypsi Wharf" from the publication of American "Pegasus".

== Popularity in culture ==
Both poetry of Jasimuddin's Nakshi kanthar Math and 'Sojan Badiar Ghat' are equally popular. The stories of both poets are mixed with the souls of Bengal. These poems are employed in rural roadside drama and in theatre.

== Popularity of Intercom ==
The book has been translated into several languages including English. World poet, Rabindranath Tagore also praised the book, writing, "Your universe is worthy of praise". I have no doubt about the book that will be completed in Bengal's reader society. " The respected artist Hashem Khan made the book illustrations.

Professor of Bangla Language and Literature of Czechoslovakia Professor Dr. Dammosla Jubvitel said about Jasim Uddin, "While reading Jasim Uddin's book, I discover new beauty in it. ... poet Jasim Uddin ... These rural literature closely familiar, for a long long years he collected village songs. He is, telling, childhood The name of the biggest poet like the names of the people who were named as the public. I believe that he has received outer form of books of his' Nakshi Kanthar Math', 'Sojan Badiar Ghat', 'Sakina', learned to drink from the sea of the same abdominal beauty with the poets .... whom Jasim Uddin's immense compassionate and compassionate It can be said that Poetic Humanism .... UNTHER people, people of the village, soil people, Bengali people with numerous ties tied with bonds. Understanding their happiness, know that their joyfulness is to face."

== Save and reputation ==
United Nations Education, Science and Cultural Organization (UNESCO) has published it in its series UNESCO collection of representative works.
