= Ten Berge =

Ten Berge is a Dutch toponymic surname originally meaning "at the hill / mound". A much more common name with a similar meaning is Van den Berg. Ten Berge may refer to:

- H. C. ten Berge (born 1938), Dutch poet, prose writer, and translator
- Joey ten Berge (born 1985), Dutch darts player
