= Jasim Folk Fair =

Traditional fair in Faridpur district of Bangladesh

Jasim Folk Fair / Jasim Rural Fair জসীম পল্লীমেলা
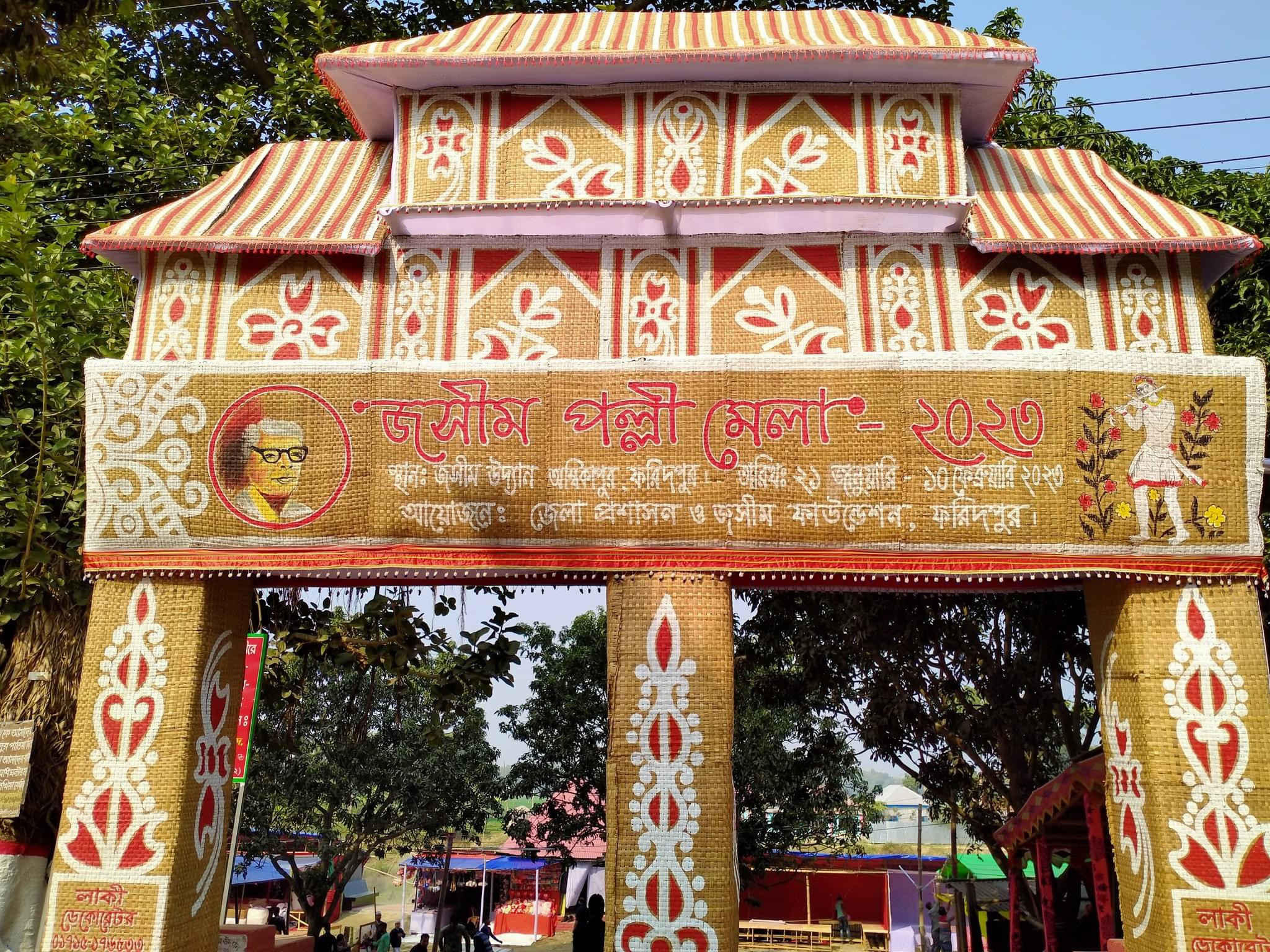
- Main Gate, Jasim Folk Fair 2023
- Genre: Cultural
- Frequency: Every one year
- Locations: Faridpur Sadar Upazila, Faridpur
- Country: Bangladesh
- Inaugurated: 1988
- Major events: Cultural programs

Jasim Folk Fair (Bengali: জসীম পল্লীমেলা [jasim polli mela]) is a traditional fair in Faridpur district of Bangladesh. In memory of the folk poet Jasimuddin, it is organized under the supervision of Faridpur District Administration and Jasim Foundation every year at Gobindapur on the banks of the Kumar River in Ambikapur Union of Sadar Upazila of Faridpur District, the poet's birthplace. Usually, this fair is organized on January 1, the birthday of poet Jasim Uddin. The main attractions of the Jasim Folk Fair are poetry recitation, songs, dances, dramas, and folk song competitions.

== History ==
The first Jasim Mela was held on January 1, 1988, the birth anniversary of Palli Kobi Jasim Uddin, at the initiative of Faridpur Sahitya Parishad. At that time, the duration of the fair was only three days. Later, the duration of the fair was increased to seven, fifteen, and one month.

In 1991, the importance of the fair increased when the then President Shahabuddin Ahmed attended the inaugural ceremony. Later, the district administration and Jasim Foundation started playing a role in organizing the fair.

In January 2023, a 21-day Jasim Palli Mela was held. The fair includes various cultural programs, poetry recitation, songs, dances, dramas, stalls of products made by local artisans, stalls of various foods, and many more attractions.

== Gallery ==
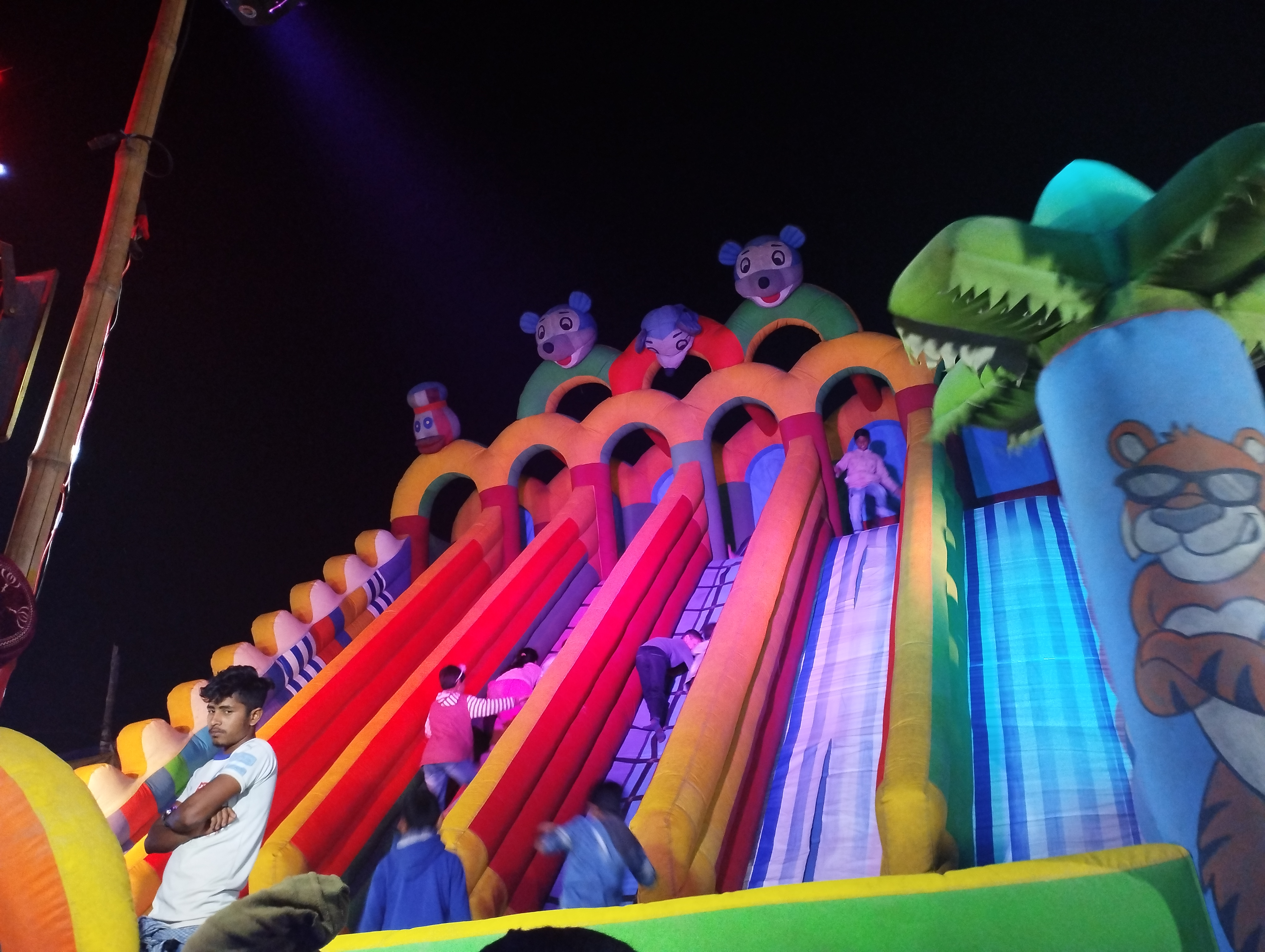

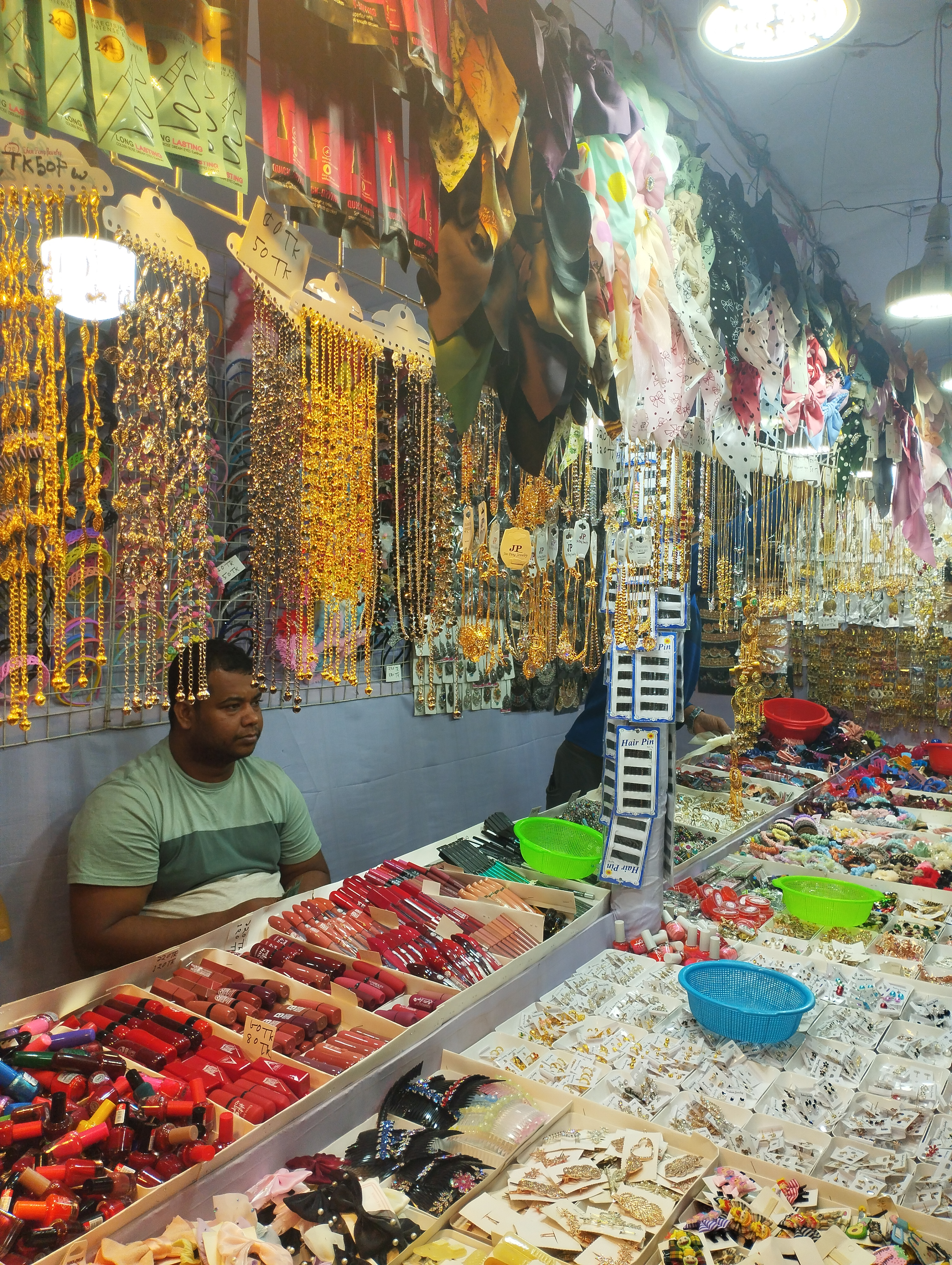

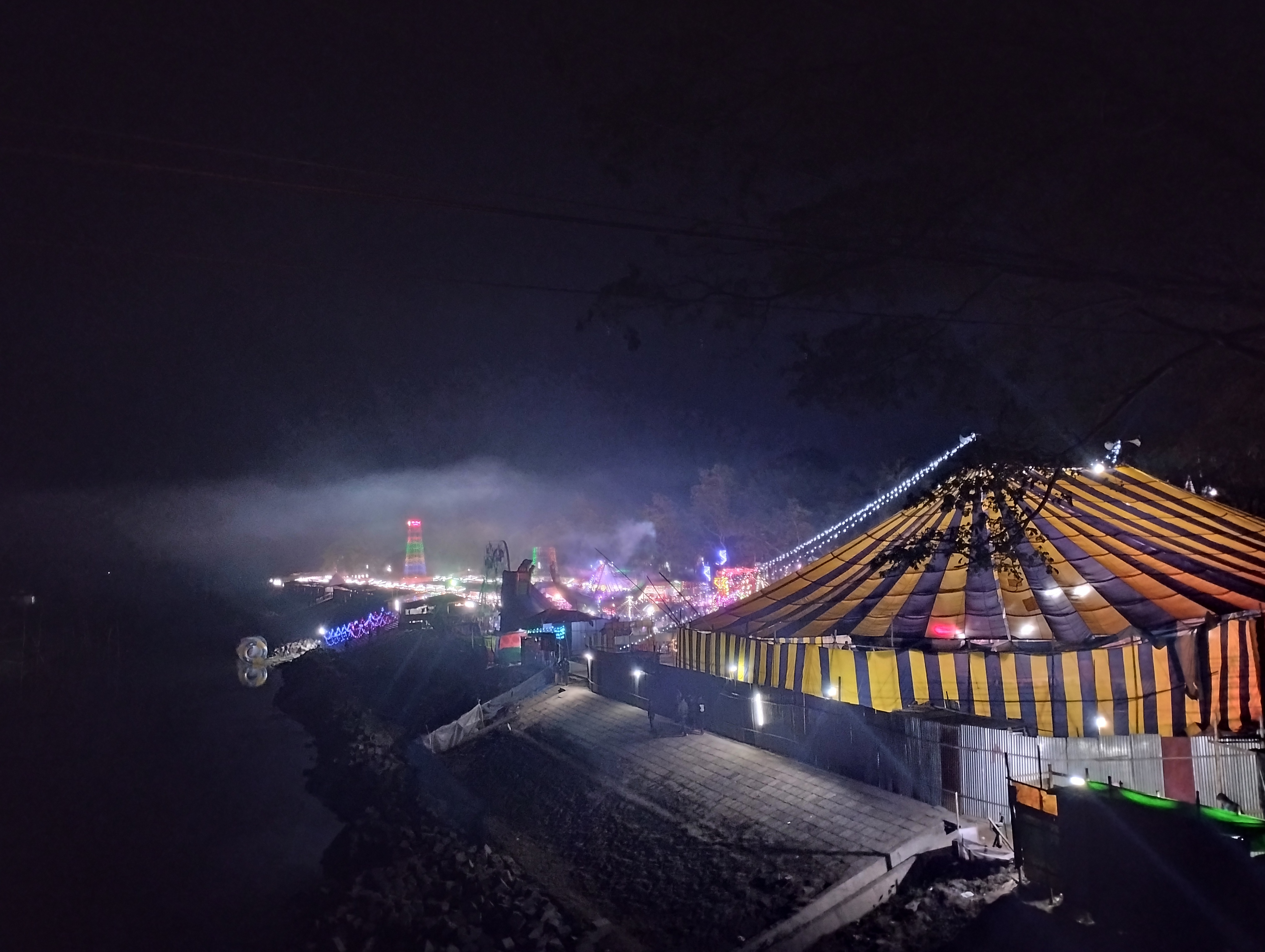

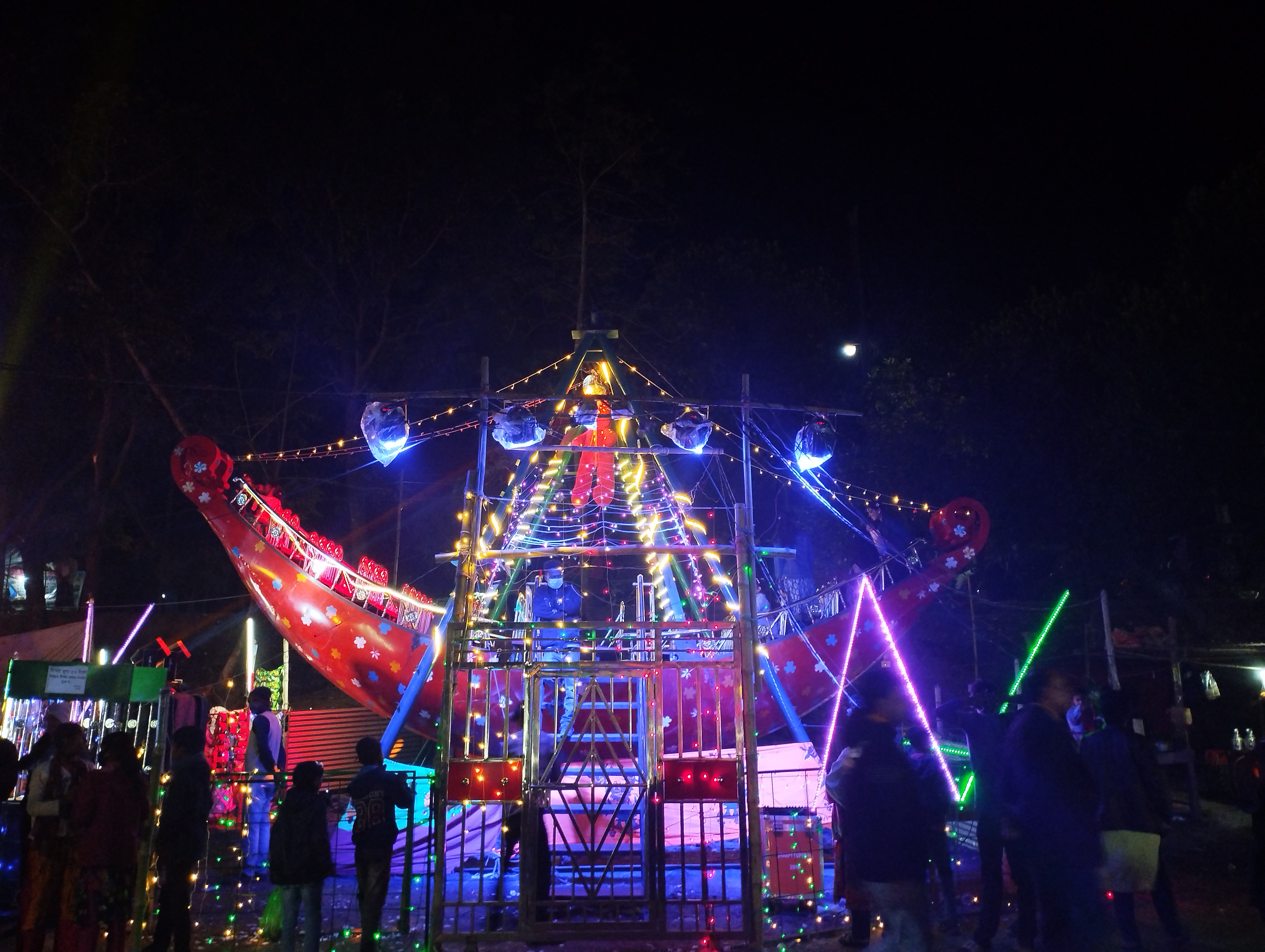

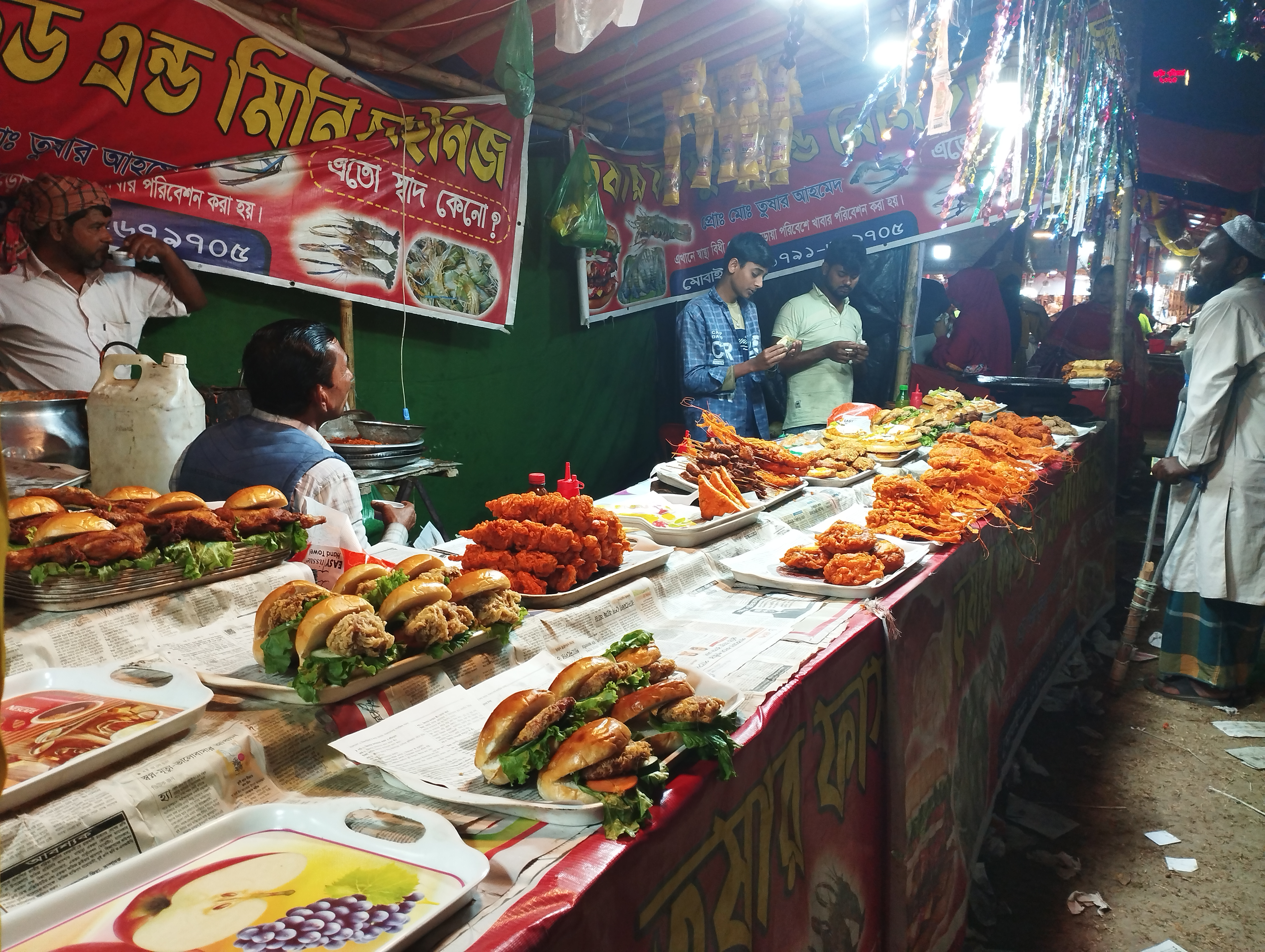

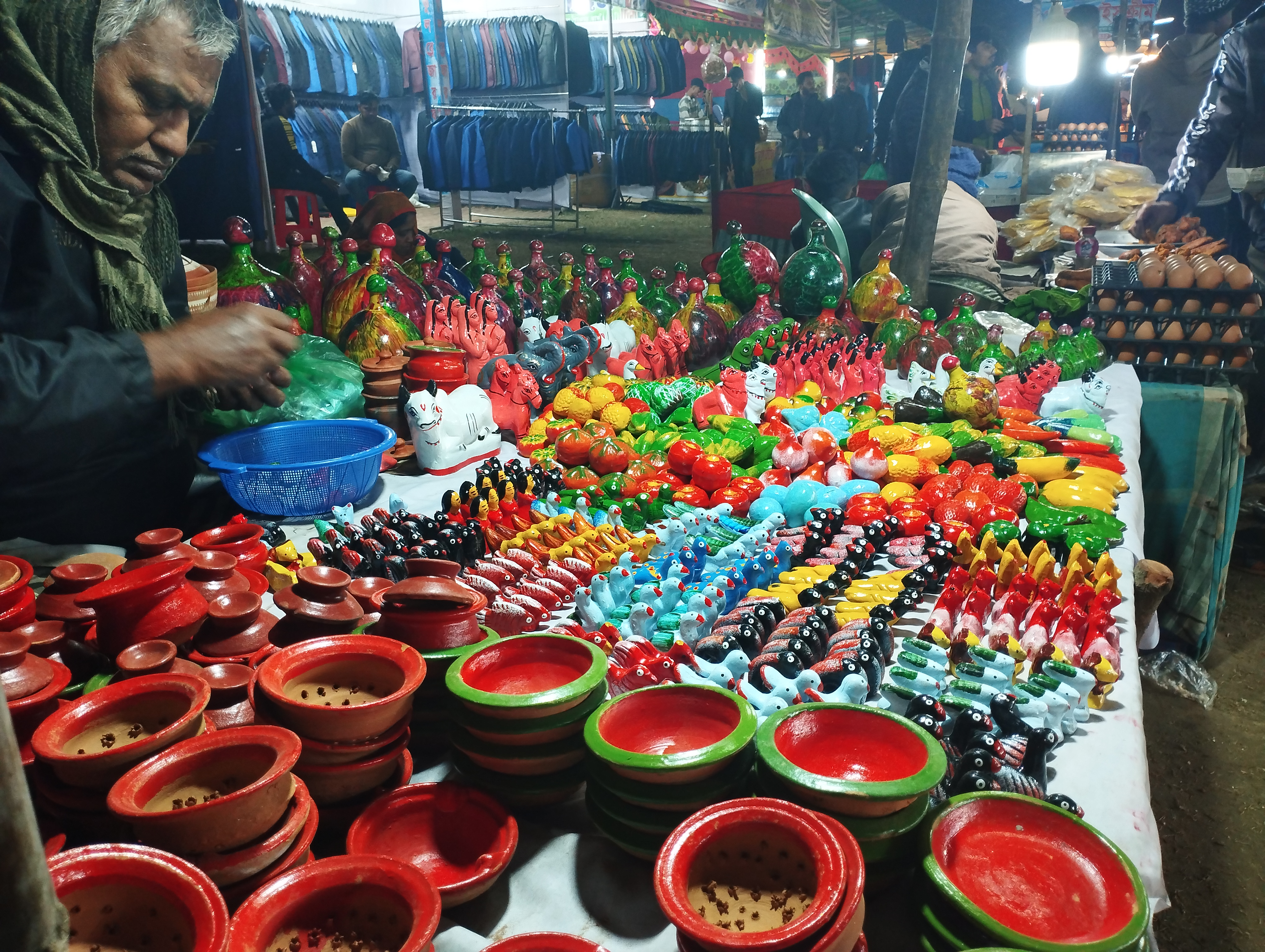

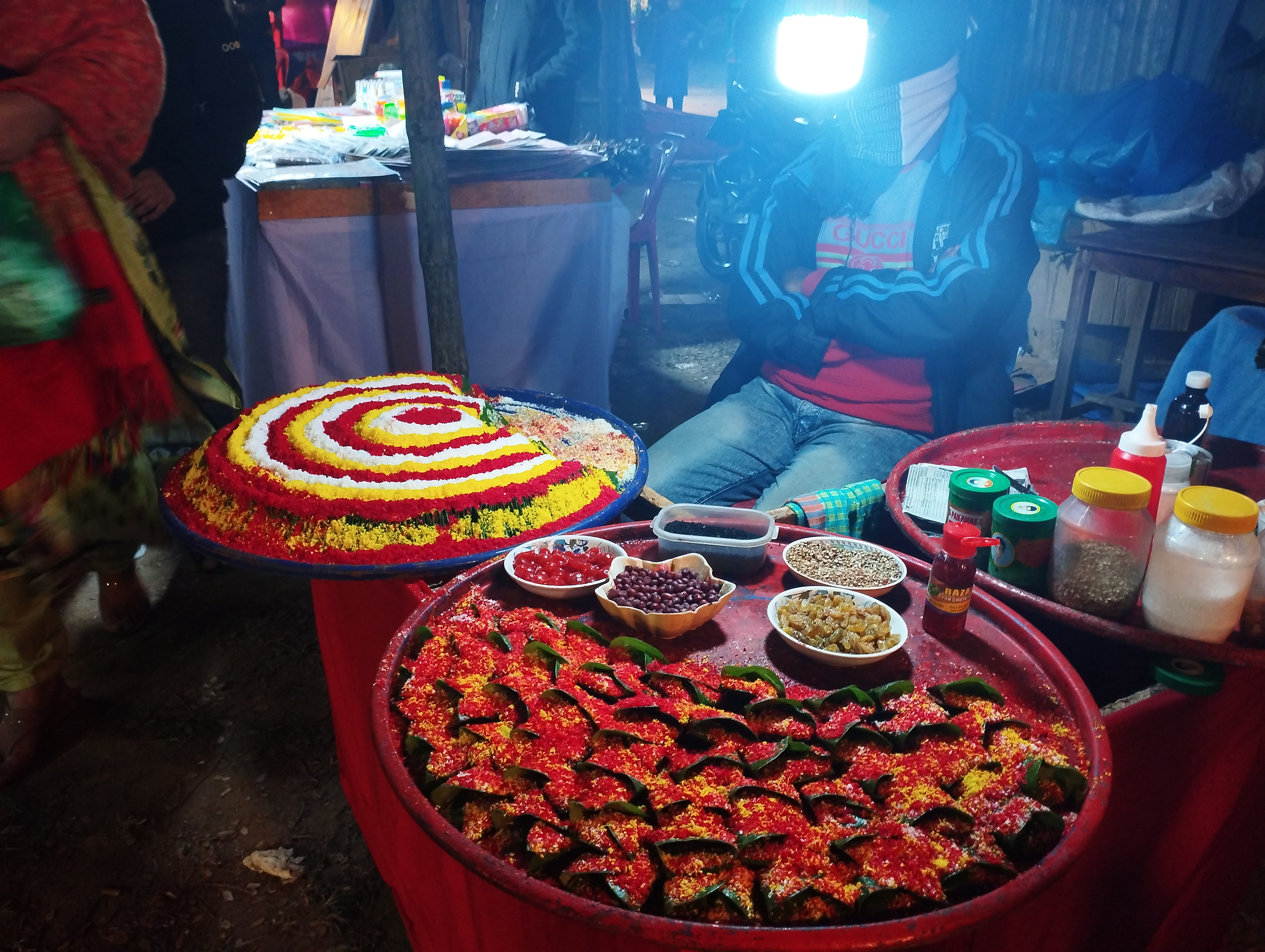

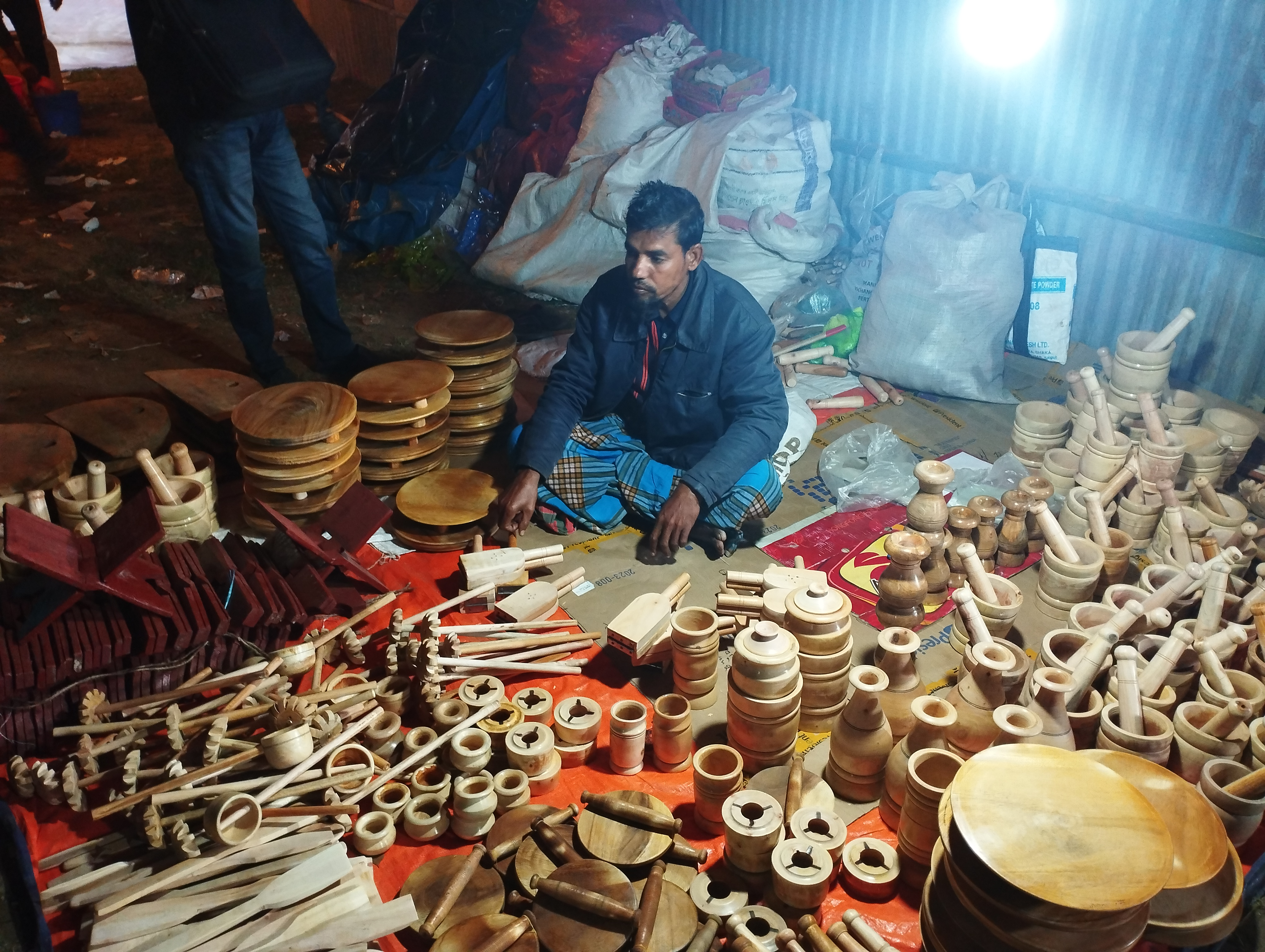

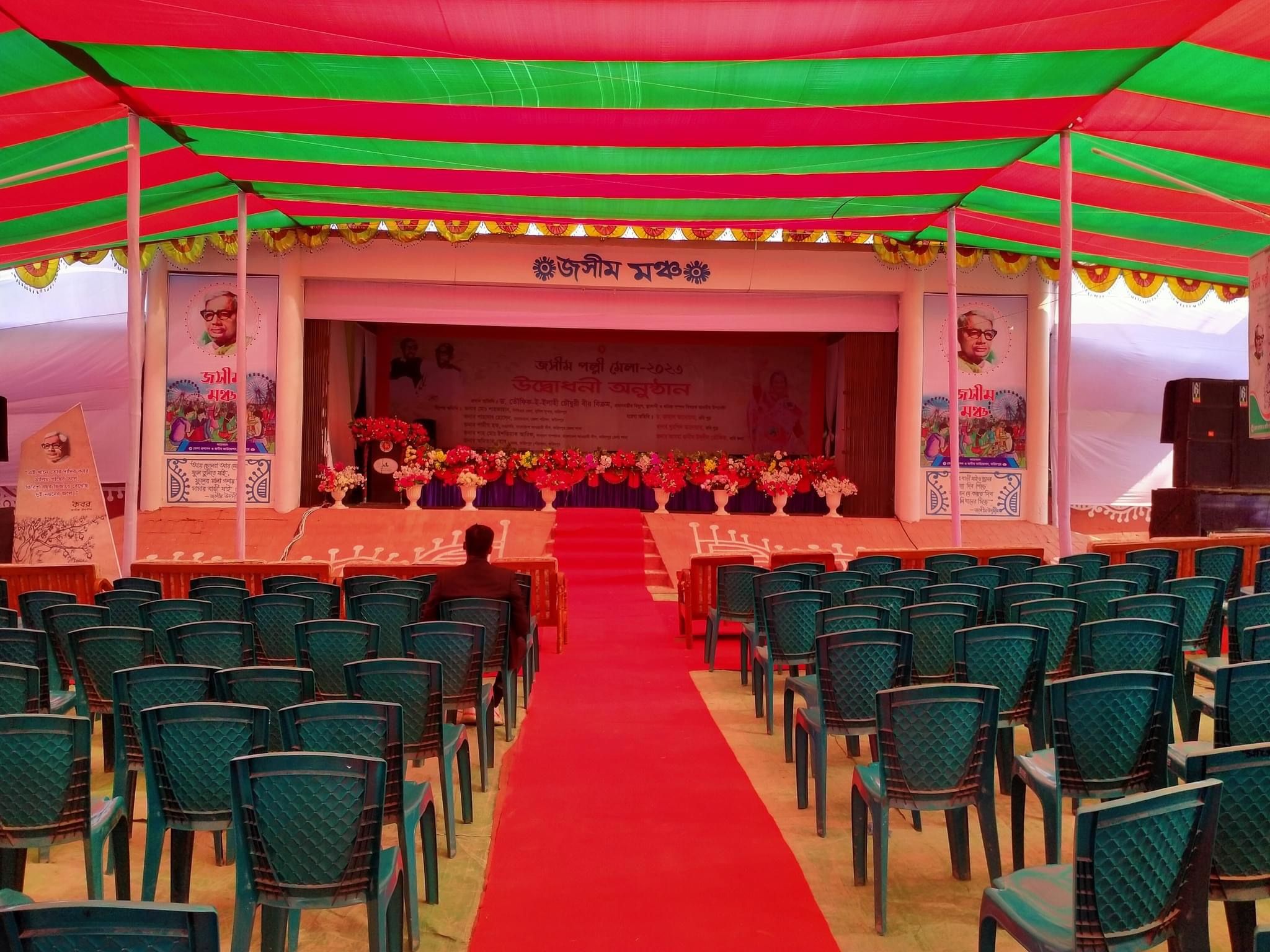

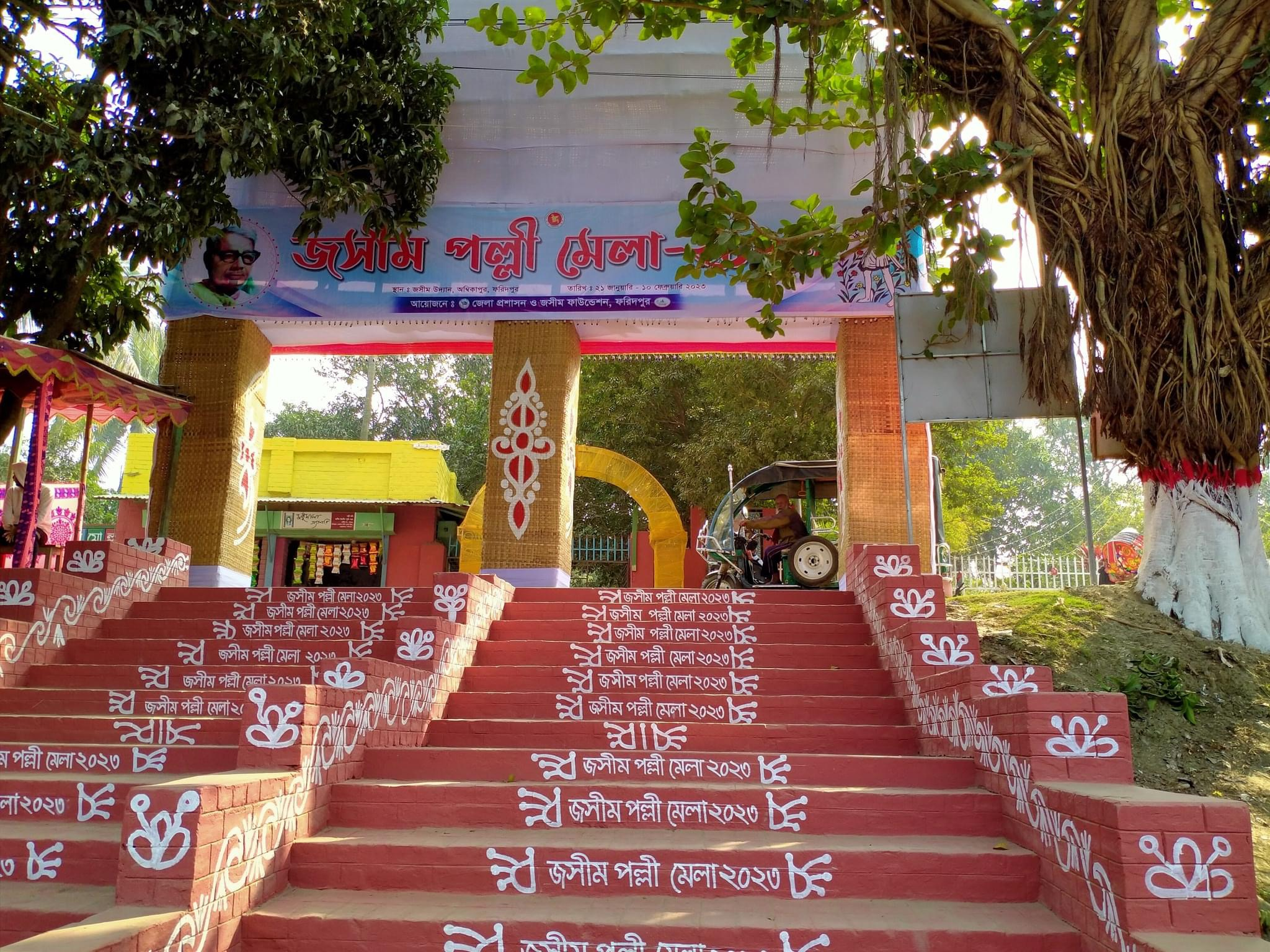

== See also ==
- Jasimuddin
