= Willem Roggeman =

Belgian poet, novelist and art critic (born 1935)

Willem Maurits Roggeman (born 9 July 1935) is a Belgian poet, novelist and art critic.

== Career ==
Brussels-born Willem Roggeman attended the Etterbeek Royal Atheneum and then studied economics at Ghent University. His journalistic career began in 1959 when he became cultural editor of Het Laatste Nieuws, where he published articles on literature, visual arts and jazz. Between 1981 and 1993 he was deputy director and acting director of the Flemish Cultural Centre De Brakke Grond in Amsterdam, where he organized exhibitions of important Flemish artists and literary evenings with Flemish and Dutch authors. From 1982 to 1989, and again from 2006, he served as president of the Louis Paul Boon Society. He has also worked on the editorial boards of the literary magazines Diagram (1963–1964), Kentering (1966–1976), De Vlaamse Gids (1970–1992), Atlantis (2001–2002) and Boelvaar Poef (since 2006). In 1988 he was awarded the Order of Leopold II for his cultural work.

Roggeman received his first poetry award when he was 21 and a number of others have followed. His poetry up to 1985 was collected in Memoires and a further comprehensive selection appeared in De tijd hapert in de spiegel (2000). His poetry has been widely translated and he is a regular guest at international poetry festivals. He has also published two novels as well as several collections of articles on artists and highly regarded interviews with writers.

== Bibliography ==
=== Poetry ===
- Rhapsody in blue, 1958, De Sikkel, Antwerp (ill: Maurice Wyckaert)
- Een (hinder) paalwoning, 1958, Uitgeverij Ontwikkeling, Antwerp (ill: Chris Yperman)
- De revolte der standbeelden, 1960, Ontwikkeling, Antwerp (ill. Maurice Wyckaert)
- Bij wijze van schrijven, 1960, De Beuk, Amsterdam NL
- Baudelaire verliefd, 1963, Die Poorte, Antwerp (ill: Pol Mara)
- Incunabel, 1964 Colibrant, Deurle
- Het orakel van New York City, 1969, Manteau, Brussels/Den Haag
- Gedichten 1957–1970. De School van het Plotseling Ontwaken, 1972, De Standaard, Antwerp/ Nijgh en Van Ditmar, Den Haag NL (intro: Mark Dangin)
- Een gefilmde droom, 1973, Hooft, Aalst (3 lithographs: Pol Mara)
- Sneeuwblindheid, 1974, Nijgh en Van Ditmar, Den Haag NL
- Een fata morgana in Vlaanderen, 1976 Het Smalle Wed, Maastricht NL
- De droom van een robot, 1976, Heideland-Orbis, Hasselt (Poëtisch erfdeel der Nederlanden 95)
- Een gril van de natuur, 1979, Van Hyfte, Ertvelde (ill: Marcel Wauters)
- Kosmos, 1979, Masereel Instituut, Kasterlee (graphic: Maurice Haccuria)
- De 7 werken van barmhartigheid, 1980, Honest Arts Movement, Ghent (7 etchings: Camille D’Havé)
- Het zwart van Goya, 1982 Manteau, Antwerp/Amsterdam
- Hommage aan Tinguely, 1984, Imschoot, Ghent (5 poems with German translations by Heinz Schneeweiss; 5 litho’s: Emiel Hoorne)
- Een leegte die verdwijnt, 1985, Marsyas, Amsterdam NL (ill: Marc Mendelson)
- Memoires. Gedichten 1955–1985, 1985, Soethoudt, Antwerp (intro: Paul de Vree; ill: Yvan Theys)
- Fictieve winter, 1986, Marsyas, Amsterdam
- Het relaas van Ammanakth, 1987, Dilbeekse Cahiers, Dilbeek (ill: Maurice Haccuria)
- Al wie omkijkt is gezien. Gedichten 1974–1987, 1988, Manteau, Antwerp/Amsterdam (intro: Hubert Lampo; portrait: Godfried Vervisch)
- Niets gaat ooit voorbij/Nichts geht je vorbei, 1991, Dilbeekse Cahiers, Dilbeek (14 poems with German translation by Heinz Schneeweiss; ill: Kathrin Lübbers; forward: Paul de Boer)
- Afrikaanse emblemata, 1992, Stichting Artcol, Ghent (3 poems to litho’s by Luc De Blok)
- Kleurstof gemengd in liefde, 1993, Kunstverlag Edition di Bernardi, Aachen D (4 watercolors: Katrien Caymax)
- De uitvinding van de tederheid, 1994, Poëziecentrum, Ghent
- Geschiedenis, 1996, De Beuk, Amsterdam NL
- Geschiedenis, 1998, uitgeverij P, Louvain (uitgebreide versie; ill. Jan Burssens)
- Het failliet van het realisme, 1999, uitgeverij P, Leuven (ill: Beniti Coirnelis)
- Erostratos, 1999, Openbaar Kunstbezit in Vlaanderen, Ghent (poems to drawings by Rik Vermeersch; intro: Frans Boenders)
- De tijd hapert in de spiegel, 2000, uitgeverij P, Louvain (intro: Geert van Istendael)
- Geschiedenis II, 2002, uitgeverij P, Louvain (ill: Jan Cox)
- Het nut van de poëzie, 2003, uitgeverij P, Louvain (ill: Fred Bervoets)
- Blue Notebook Jazzgedichten, 2006, Demian, Antwerpen (forward: Simon Vinkenoog)
- De metamorfosen van de dichter, 2008, De Contrabas, Utrecht/Leeuwarden NL (pentekeningen: Marc Mendelson)
- Taalgebied, 2009, De Contrabas, Utrecht/Leeuwarden NL
- Jan van Ruusbroec en de stilte, 2010, Bergen op Zoom NL, ill. Willem Hussem
- Lichaamstaal, limited edition of a broadsheet 2010, Bergen op Zoom NL, ill. Gerrit Westerveld
- Hier wonen de woorden, 2011 Bergen op Zoom NL
- Notities voor een poëtica van de tijd, 2013 Bergen op Zoom NL, ill. Marcase,

== Translations ==
- Le Rêve du robot, 1976, Bruxelles, tr. Jeanne Buytaert, illustration by Serge Vandercam, [French]
- Le travail du poète 1979, Bruxelles, tr. Jeanne Buytaert, illustration by Jacky Duyck [French]
- Die Arbeit des Dichters, 1982 Basel, tr. Heinz Schneeweiss [German]
- The Revolution Begins in Bruges, 1983 Windsor, Ontario, tr. Dorothy Howard, Hendrika Ruger, [English]
- A Vanishing Emptiness, selected poems, London 1989, ed. Yann Lovelock, illustrations by Pol Mara [English]
- Cruth an Daonnai, de vorm van een mens, Dublin 1990, selected poems by Willem M. Roggeman, translated into Irish by Gabriel Rosenstock [Irish]
- L' invenzione della tenerezza, Faenza 1995, tr. Giovanni Nadiani [Italian]
- Die Erfindung der Zärtlichkeit, Münster 1996, tr. Hienz Schneeweiss [German]
- L’invention de la tendresse, Marseille 1997, tr. Evelyne Wilwerth, illustration by Mireille Ayakaluka [French]
- L’utilité de la poésie, B-4540 Amay 2003, tr. Evelyne Wilwerth
- L' utile della poesia, Faenza 2004, tr. Giovanni Nadiani [Italian]
- Les métamorphoses du poète, B-4540 Amay 2006, tr. Elisabeth Gerlache [French]
- Blue Notebook : Poesie in jazz, Faenza, 2007, tr. Giovanni Nadiani [Italian]
- A Splendid View on Words, 2010 Demer Press, Belgium, ed. Roy Eales [English], ill. Marc Mendelson
- Hôtel Mélancolie B-4540 Amay 2010, poetry and theatre [French]
- Poems and Portraits, 2012 tr. Dmitri Silvestrov, Moscow [Russian]

== Literary awards ==
1963: Dirk Martens Prize of the city of Aalst for the poetry collection Baudelaire verliefd.
1974: The Louis Paul Boon Prize
1975: Prize of the city of Brussels for Sneeuwblindheid.
1997: Premio Internazionale di Poesia Riccardo Marchi Torre for the poetry collection L'Invenzione della tenerezza
2007: Premio Tratti for the Italian translation of Blue Notebook
2010: Zeist (NL) Literature Prize for his poem Lichaamstaal
2012: Dilbeek Culture Prize, in conjunction with the publication of Hier wonen de wolken

== See also ==
- Flemish literature
