= Évelyne Wilwerth =

Belgian author writing in French (born 1947)

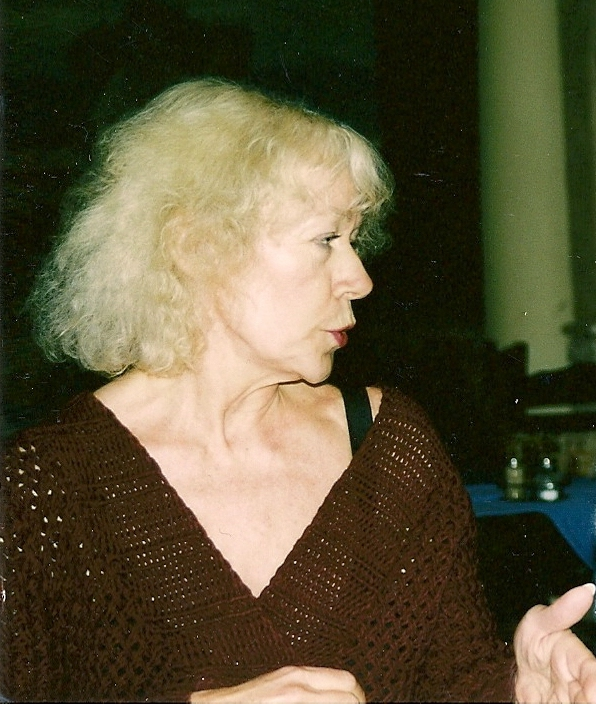
Évelyne Wilwerth in 2003

Évelyne Wilwerth (born 1947) is a Belgian author writing in French.

She was born in Spa and earned her certificate to teach Romance philology. She taught French for nine years before retiring to devote herself to writing. She has lived in Stavelot, Virton, Nivelles, Paris, Provence and most recently in Brussels. Wilwerth has led writing workshops in Belgium and France. She has also participated in conferences on French literature.

Her stories have been broadcast on RTBF and on Radio Canada.

Wilwerth has translated several poetry collections by Willem Roggeman from Dutch into French. She has also published youth literature and several essays on writing by women.

== Selected works ==
=== Poetry ===
- La péniche-ferveur (1978)
- Le cerfeuil émeraude (1981)
- Neiges de boule (1989)
- Dessine-moi les quatre éléments (1993) with Manu van de Velde
- 22 astuces pour une vie plus magique (2011)

=== Novels ===
- Canal océan (1997)
- La vie cappuccino (1999)
- Je m'appelle Rhubarbe (2004)
- Papillon mortel (2010)
- Miteux et magnifiques (2013)

=== Stories ===
- Grenat (1982) with Manu van de Velde
- Histoires très fausses (1985)
- Embrasser la vie sur la bouche (2001)

=== Plays ===
- Hortense, ta pétillance (1980)
- Pulchérie et Poulchérie (1982)
- Gil et Giroflée (1983)
- Pieds nus dans la lumière (2004)
