= Encyclopedia of Buddhist Arts =

- Author: Venerable Master Hsing Yun, Editor
- Language: Traditional Chinese
- Series: 20 books
- Subject: Encyclopedia of Buddhist Arts
- Publisher: Fo Guang Shan
- Publication date: March 2013
- Publication place: Taiwan
- Media type: Hardcover, full-color printing
- Pages: Each book has 384-400 pages
- ISBN: 978-986-5844-00-4

Encyclopedia of Buddhist Arts (Chinese: 世界佛教美術圖說大辭典; pinyin: Shìjiè fójiào měishù túshuō dà cídiǎn) is a set of books that was started by the founder of Fo Guang Shan, Venerable Master Hsing Yun. The project started in 2001 and was completed in March 2013. There are 20 volumes in total and the artwork spans all 5 continents with information from more than 30 countries. The project was made possible with the help of numerous scholars and volunteers, 300 monastics, 140 scholars from 16 different countries, and more than 400 volunteers. Fo Guang Shan has donated copies of the encyclopedia to libraries and academic institutions across the world.

The volumes are divided into 8 categories:

- Architecture - 4 volumes
- Caves - 5 volumes
- Sculpture - 4 volumes
- Paintings - 3 volumes
- Calligraphy and engravings - 1 volume
- Artifacts - 1 volume
- People - 1 volume
- Index - 1 volume

The volumes are printed in color with over 9000 articles, 4 million words, and 15,000 pictures in total.
