= Jasimuddin =

Bangladeshi poet (1903-1976)

- জসীমউদ্দীন
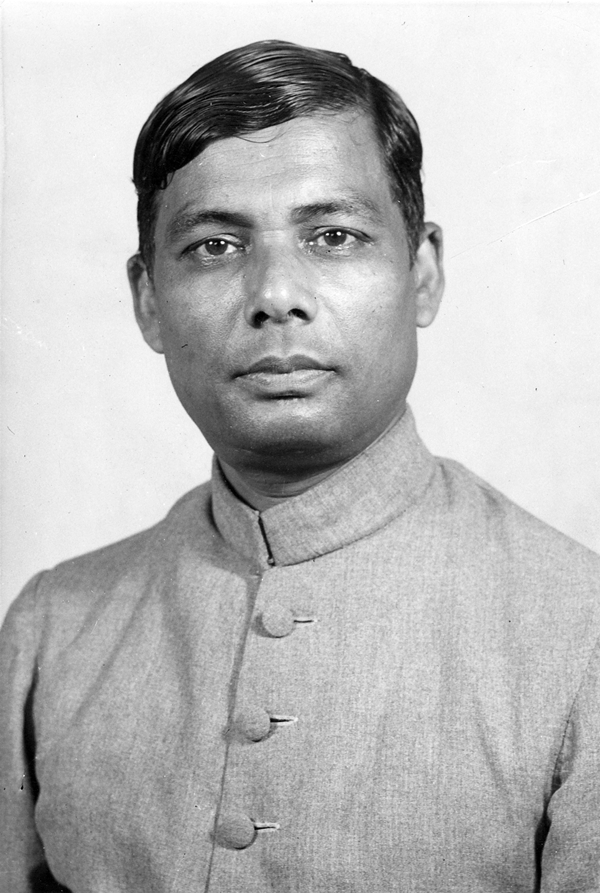
- Jasimuddin in 1951
- Pronunciation: [d͡ʒoʃimud̪ːin]
- Born: 1 January 1903; Tambulkhana, Faridpur, Bengal Presidency, British India
- Died: 14 March 1976 (aged 73); Dhaka, Bangladesh
- Citizenship: British Indian (1903–1947); Pakistani (1947–1971); Bangladeshi (1971–1976)
- Education: MA (Bengali)
- Alma mater: University of Calcutta
- Occupations: Poet; songwriter; writer; composer; teacher
- Spouse: Begum Mamtaz Jasimuddin
- Children: Hasna Jasimuddin Moudud, Kamal Anwar Hashu, Jamal Anwar, Firoj Anwar, Khurshid Anwar, Asma Ilahi
- Awards: Ekushey Padak (1976); Independence Day Award (1978)

Jasimuddin (Note: Bengali pronunciation: [d͡ʒoʃimud̪ːin].) (Bengali: জসীম উদ্‌দীন, pronounced [d͡ʒoʃimud̪ːin]; 1 January 1903 – 14 March 1976), popularly called Palli Kabi (lit. 'Pastoral Poet'), was a Bangladeshi poet, lyricist, composer and writer widely celebrated for his modern ballad sagas in the pastoral mode. Although his full name was Jasim Uddin Mollah, he was known as Jasim Uddin. His Nakshi Kanthar Math and Sojan Badiar Ghat are considered among the best lyrical poems in the Bengali language. He is the key figure for the revivals of pastoral literature in Bengal during the 20th century. As a versatile writer, Jasimuddin wrote poems, ballads, songs, dramas, novel, stories, memoirs, travelogues, etc.

Born in Faridpur, Jasimuddin was educated at Calcutta University where he also worked as Ramtanu Lahiri assistant research fellow under Dinesh Chandra Sen from 1931 to 1937. In 1938, he joined the University of Dhaka and taught there for 5 years. In 1944, he joined the Department of Information and Broadcasting of the then government and retired in 1962.

"An ardent supporter of socialism" and Bengali language movement, Jasimuddin was "one of the pioneers of the progressive and non-communal cultural movement" during 1950s and 1960s. He was awarded the President's Award for Pride of Performance in 1958, Ekushey Padak in 1976 and Swadhinata Dibas Puruskar posthumously in 1978. He rejected Bangla Academy Award in 1974.

In January 2018, Bangla Academy announced Jasimuddin Literary Award, a biennial award to be given for life-time contribution to Bangla literature.

== Early life and career ==
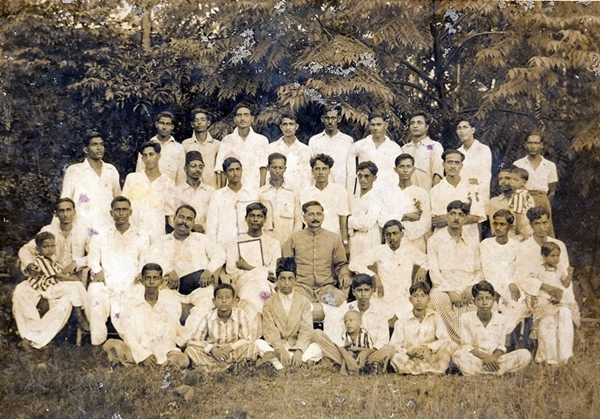
Jasimuddin (certificate in hand) at the reception by Rajenra College, Faridpur after the selection of "Kabar" poem by the University of Calcutta in 1928

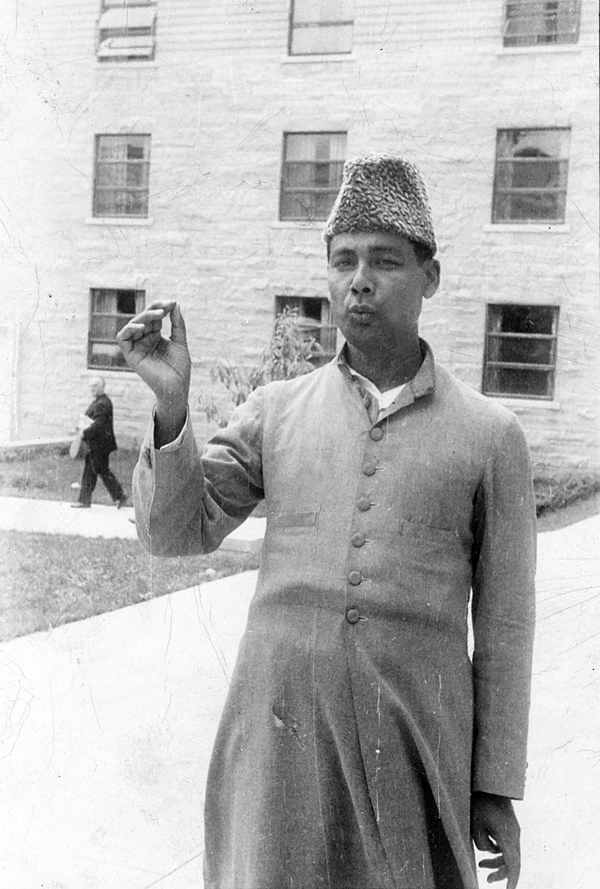
Jasimuddin in London, England (1951)

Jasimuddin was born on 1 January 1903 in his maternal uncle’s house in the village of Tambulkhana, Faridpur District. His father, Ansaruddin Mollah, was a school-teacher. His mother, Amina Khatun (Rangachhut) received early education at Faridpur Welfare School. He matriculated from Faridpur Zilla School in 1921. Jasimuddin completed IA from Rajendra College in 1924. He obtained his BA degree in Bengali from the University of Calcutta in 1929 and his MA in 1931. From 1931 to 1937, he worked with Dinesh Chandra Sen as a collector of folk literature. Jasimuddin is one of the compilers of Purbo-Bongo Gitika (Ballads of East Bengal). He collected more than 10,000 folk songs, some of which has been included in his song compilations Jari Gaan and Murshida Gaan. He also wrote voluminously on the interpretation and philosophy of Bengali folklore.

Jasimuddin joined the University of Dhaka in 1938 as a lecturer. He left the university in 1944 and then worked at the Department of Information and Broadcasting until his retirement in 1962 as the deputy director.

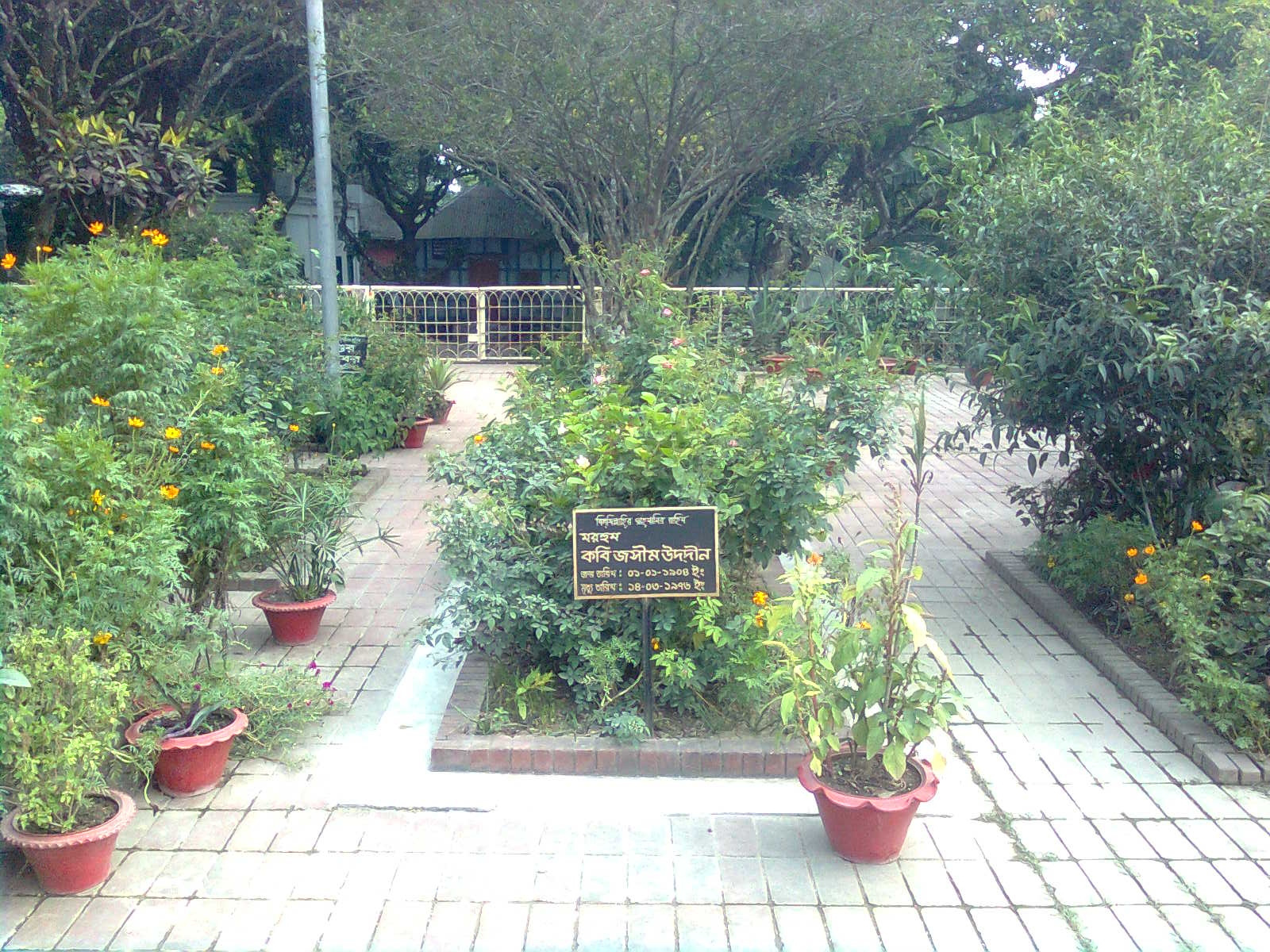
Tomb of Jasimuddin

== Poetry ==
Jasimuddin started writing poems at a young age. As a college student, he wrote the celebrated poem Kabar (The Grave), a simple tone to obtain family religion and tragedy. The poem was placed in the entrance Bengali textbook while he was still a student of Calcutta University.

Jasimuddin is noted for his depiction of rural life and nature from the viewpoint of rural people. This had earned the title as Palli Kabi (the rural poet). The structure and content of his poetry bear a strong flavor of Bengal folklore. His Nakshi Kanthar Math (Field of the Embroidered Quilt) and Sojan Badiar Ghat (Gypsy Wharf) are considered two masterpieces and have been translated into many different languages.

Jasimuddin was introduced with Abbas Uddin by poet Golam Mostofa in a musical program held in Kolkata in 1931.

== Major honors and awards ==
- President's Award for Pride of Performance, Pakistan (1958)
- DLitt. by Rabindra Bharati University, India (1969)
- Ekushey Padak (1976)
- Independence Day Award (1978)

== Personal life ==
Jasimuddin was married to Begum Mamtaz Jasimuddin (d. 2006). Together they had four sons, Kamal Anwar Hashu, Jamal Anwar, Firoz Anwar and Khurshid Anwar, and two daughters, Begum Hasna Moudud and Asma Ilahi. Hasna is married to politician Moudud Ahmed. Asma is married to Tawfiq-e-Elahi Chowdhury.

== Death and legacy ==
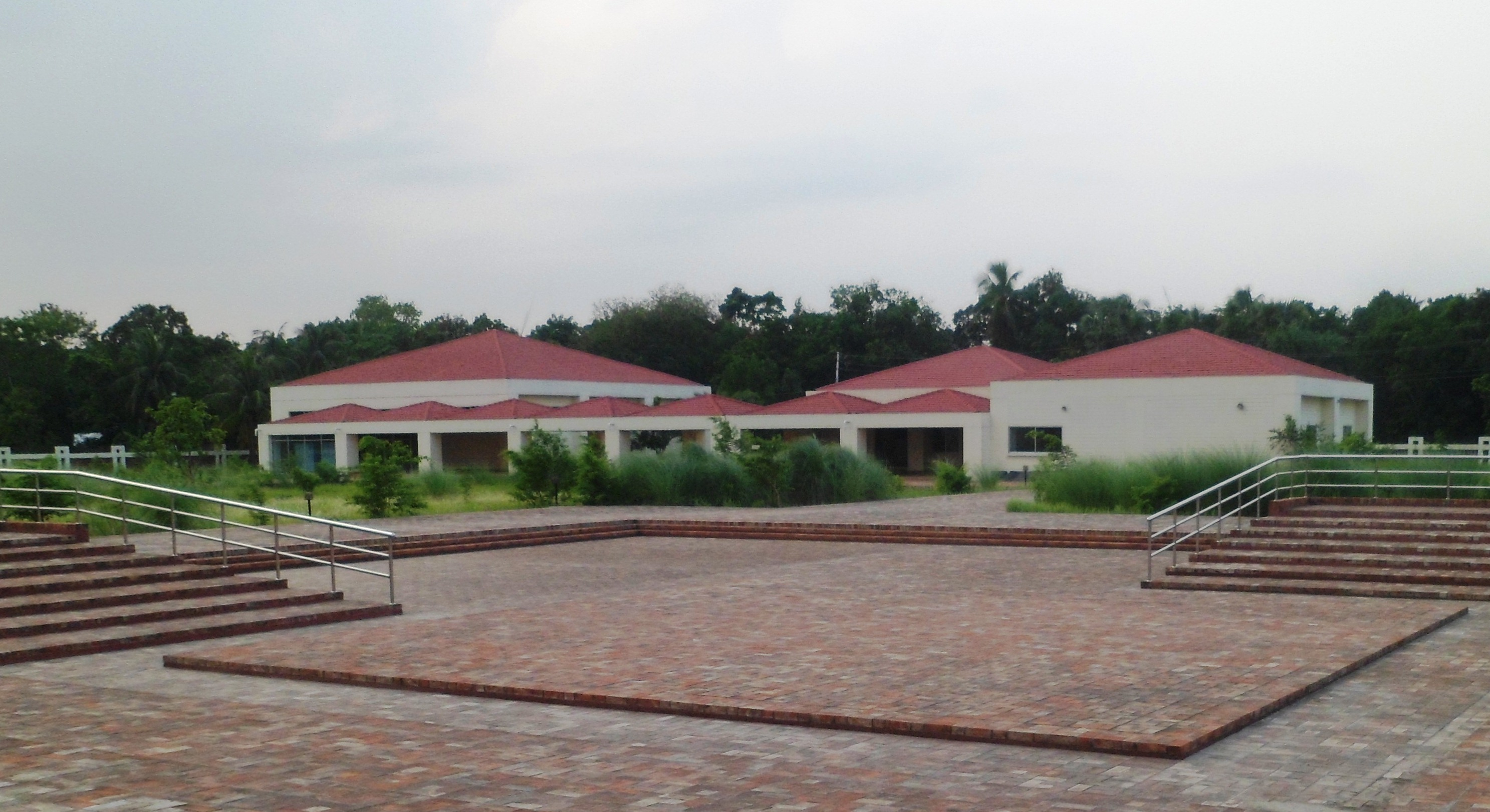
Faridpur Jasimuddin Museum in Faridpur

Jasimuddin died on 14 March 1976 and was buried near his ancestral home at Gobindapur, Faridpur. A fortnightly festival known as Jasim Mela is observed at Gobindapur each year in January commemorating his birthday.

== Major works ==
Poetry

- Rakhali; The first poetry book by him (1927)
- Nakshi Kanthar Math (1929)
- Baluchor (1930)
- Dhankhet (1933)
- Sojan Badiar Ghat (1933)
- Hashu (1938)
- Rupobati (1946)
- Matir Kanna (1951)
- Sakina (1959)
- Ma Ja Janni Kanda (1963)
- Rupoboti
- Suchoyani (1961)
- Suchayani (1961)
- Bhayabaha Sei Dingulite (1972)
- Ma je Jononi Kande(1963)
- Holud Boroni (1966)
- Jole Lekhon (1969)
- Padma Nadir Deshe (1969)
- Beder Meye (1951)
- Kafoner Michil (1978)
- Maharom
- Dumokho Chand Pahari (1987)
- Ek Poysar Bashi (1956)

Play

- Padmapar (1950)
- Beder Meye (1951)
- Modhumala (1951)
- Pallibodhu (1956)
- Gramer Maya (1959)
- Ogo Pushpodhonu (1968)
- Asman Shingho (1968)

Novel

Boba Kahini is about Faridpur life picture story; the only novel by him (1964)

Memoirs

- Jader Dekhachi (1951)
- Thakur Barir Anginay (1961)
- Jibonkotha (1964)
- Smritipot (1964)
- Smaraner Sarani Bahi (1978)

Travelogues

- Chole Musafir (1952)
- Holde Porir Deshe (1967)
- Je Deshe Manush Boro (1968)
- Germanir Shahare Bandare (1975)

Music books

- Rangila Nayer Majhi (1935)
- Padmapar (1950)
- Gangerpar (1964)
- Jari Gan (1968)
- Murshidi Gan (1977)
- Rakhali Gan
- Baul

Others

- Dalim Kumar (1986)
- Bangalir Hasir Galpa part 1 (1960) and part 2 (1964)

Song titles

- Kajol vromora re
- Amar sonar moyna pakhi
- Amar golar har khule ne
- Amar har kala korlam re
- Amay bhashaili re
- Amay eto raate
- Kemon tomar mata pita
- Nodir kul nai kinar nai
- O bondhu rongila
- Rangila nayer majhi
- Nishte Jaio Phul bane, O Bhomora
- O bajan Chal jai mathe langol baite
- Prano shokhi re oi shone kodombo tole
- O amar dorodi age janle
- Bashari Amar Harai Giache
- Balu Charer Meya
- Badol Bashi Ore Bandhu
- Ganger Kulre Gelo Bhangia
- O Tui Jare Aghat Hanlire Mone
- O Amar Gahin Ganer Naya
- Amar Bandhu Binodia

== Gallery ==
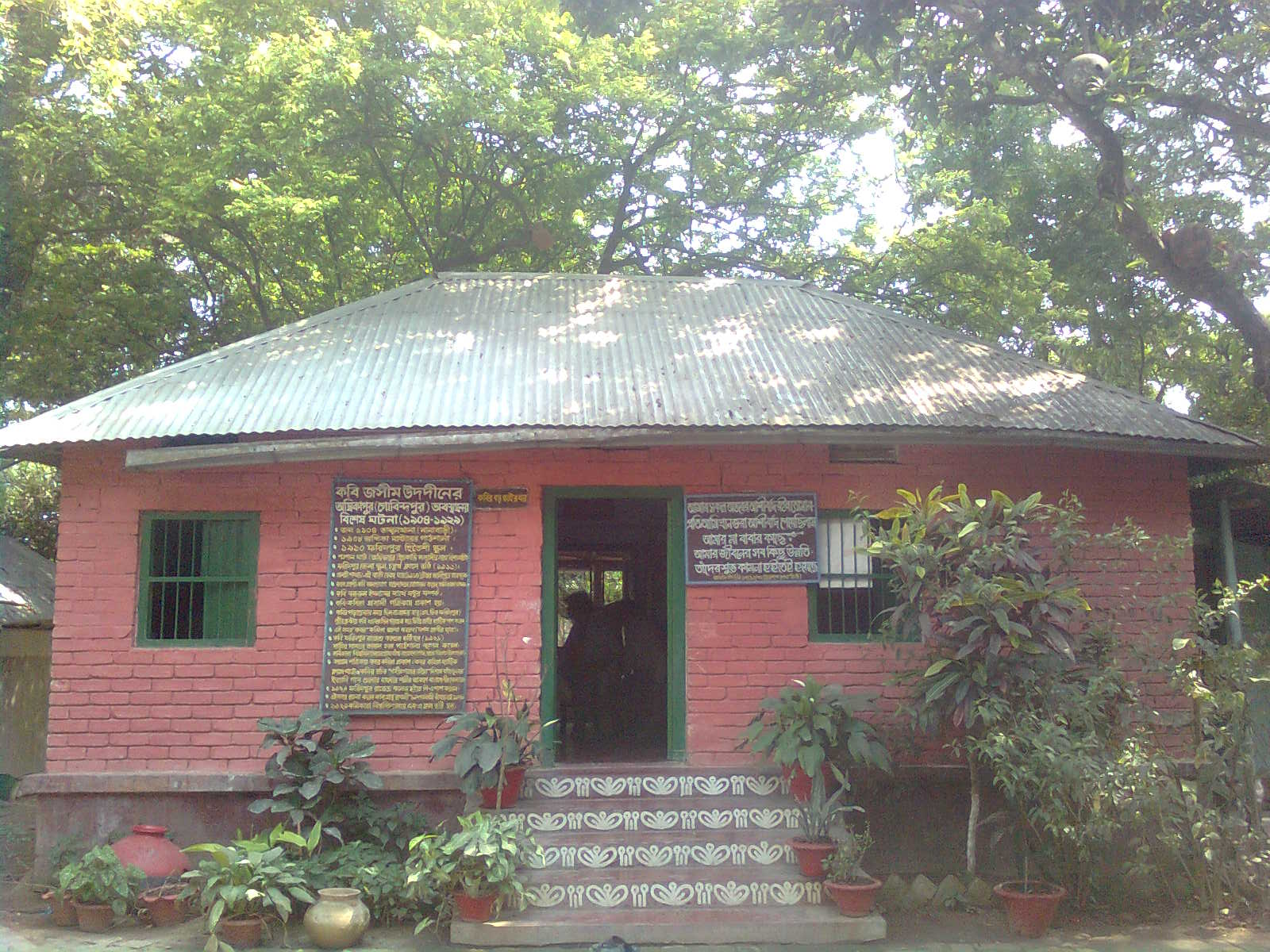
House of Jasimuddin

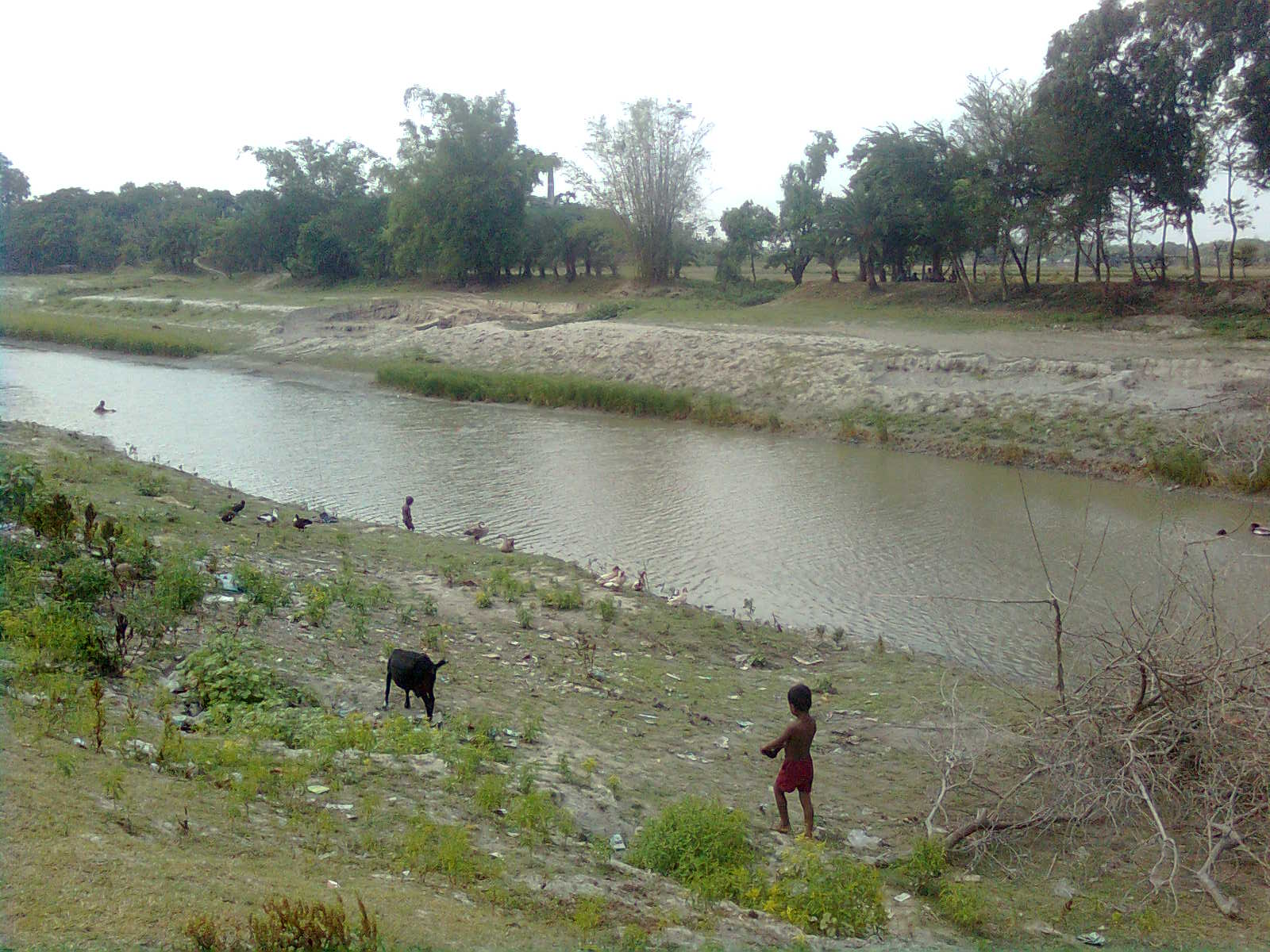
Kumar canal in front of the house

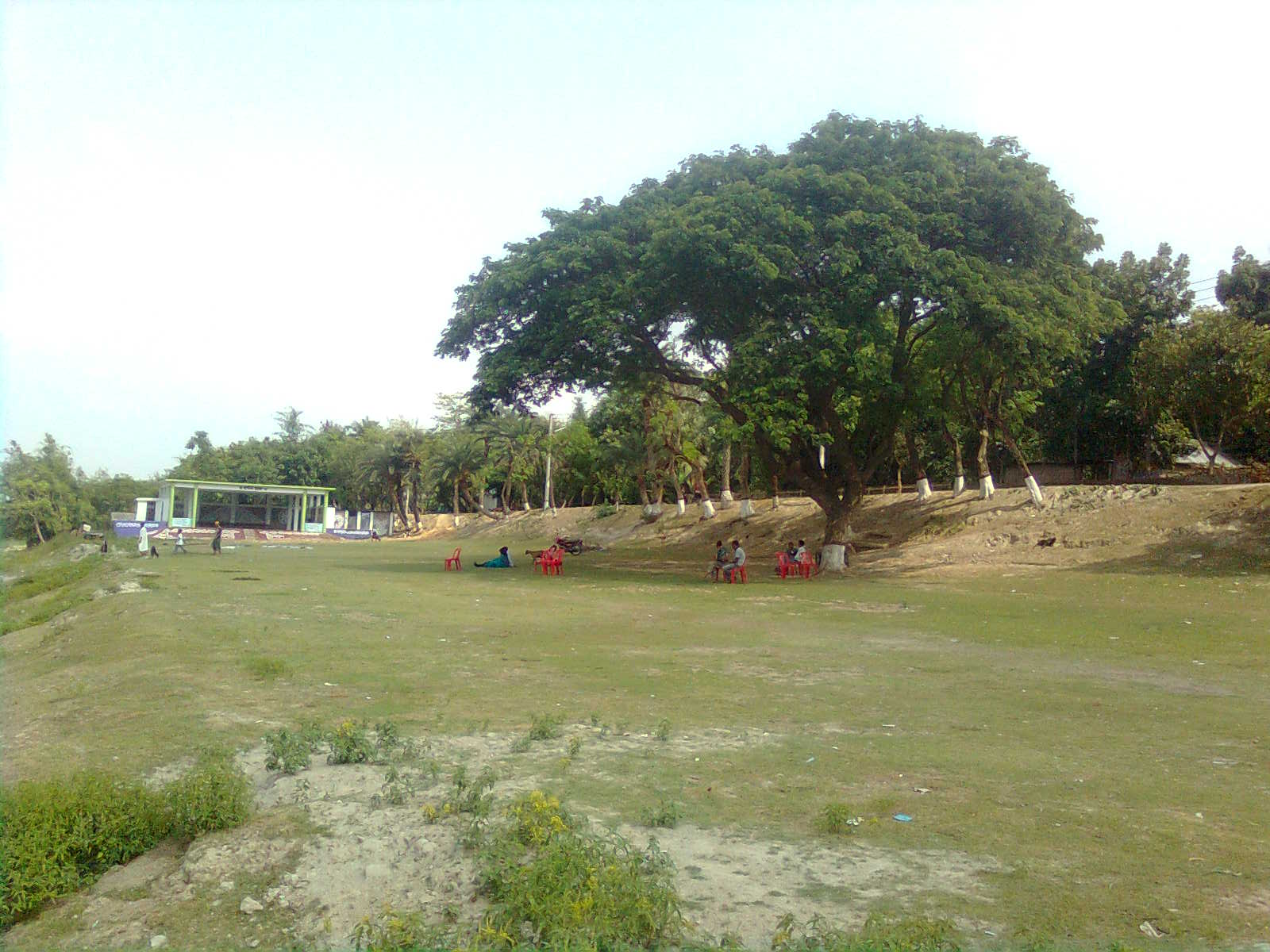
Wide open field where spent most of his childhood

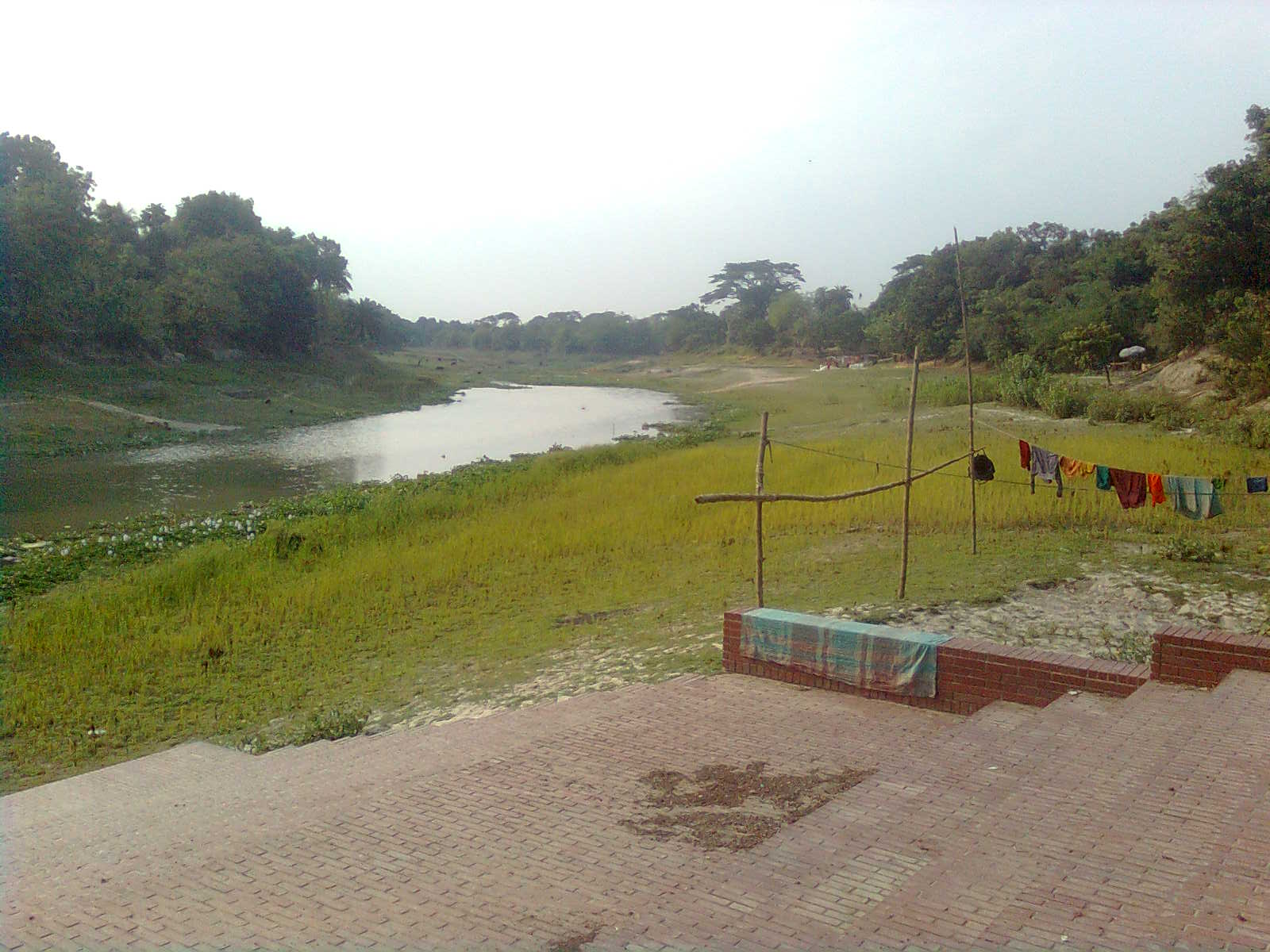
Shojon Badiyar Ghat

== See also ==
- List of Bangladeshi Poets
- Jasim Folk Fair
