= Nakshi Kanthar Math =

Book By Jasimuddin

- Author: Jasimuddin
- Original title: নকশী কাঁথার মাঠ
- Language: Bengali
- Genre: Ballad
- Publication date: 1929
- Publication place: Bangladesh (Past British Bengal)

Nakshi Kanthar Math (Bengali: নকশী কাঁথার মাঠ, lit. 'The Field of the Embroidered Quilt') is a Bengali narrative ballad written by poet Jasimuddin, published in 1929.

The work is considered a masterpiece of Bengali literature and has been translated into many different languages. The poem was translated later by Mary Milford as "The Field of the Embroidered Quilt".

== Plot summary ==
The ballad tells the tragic story of Rupai and Saju. Rupai is a young peasant, who falls in love with a girl named Saju from a neighboring village. They get married. But after a quarrel and fight with some peasants of another village, Rupa leaves home and flees far away. Saju, the young wife becomes alone. She waits every day, expecting that her husband will return to her, but nothing happens. She becomes tired, as all her hopes fail. Many days pass and Saju begins to prepare a Nakshi Kantha (an embroidered quilt). In that Nakshi Kantha she stitches together the incidents and tragedies of her life. More days pass, but Rupa does not return. Saju eventually dies. Before her death she requests her mother to place the Nakshi Kantha on her resting place. Her mother fulfills her last wish.

সেই হতে তার নামটি হয়েছে নকশী কাঁথার মাঠ...
Translation: Since then the field is known as Nakshi Kanthar Math

Some days after Saju's death, villagers find a young man lying dead on her grave, holding that Nakshi Kantha. They identify the man as Rupa.

== Legacy ==
This poem is credited as popularising the term Nakshi Kantha. This work has featured cover illustrations by Zainul Abedin.

This poem has inspired various stage plays and television drama adaptations. A telefilm adaptation of this work with the same name was directed by Razib Hassan, starring Chanchal Chowdhury and Farhana Mili as the leads.
