= H. C. ten Berge =

Dutch writer (born 1938)

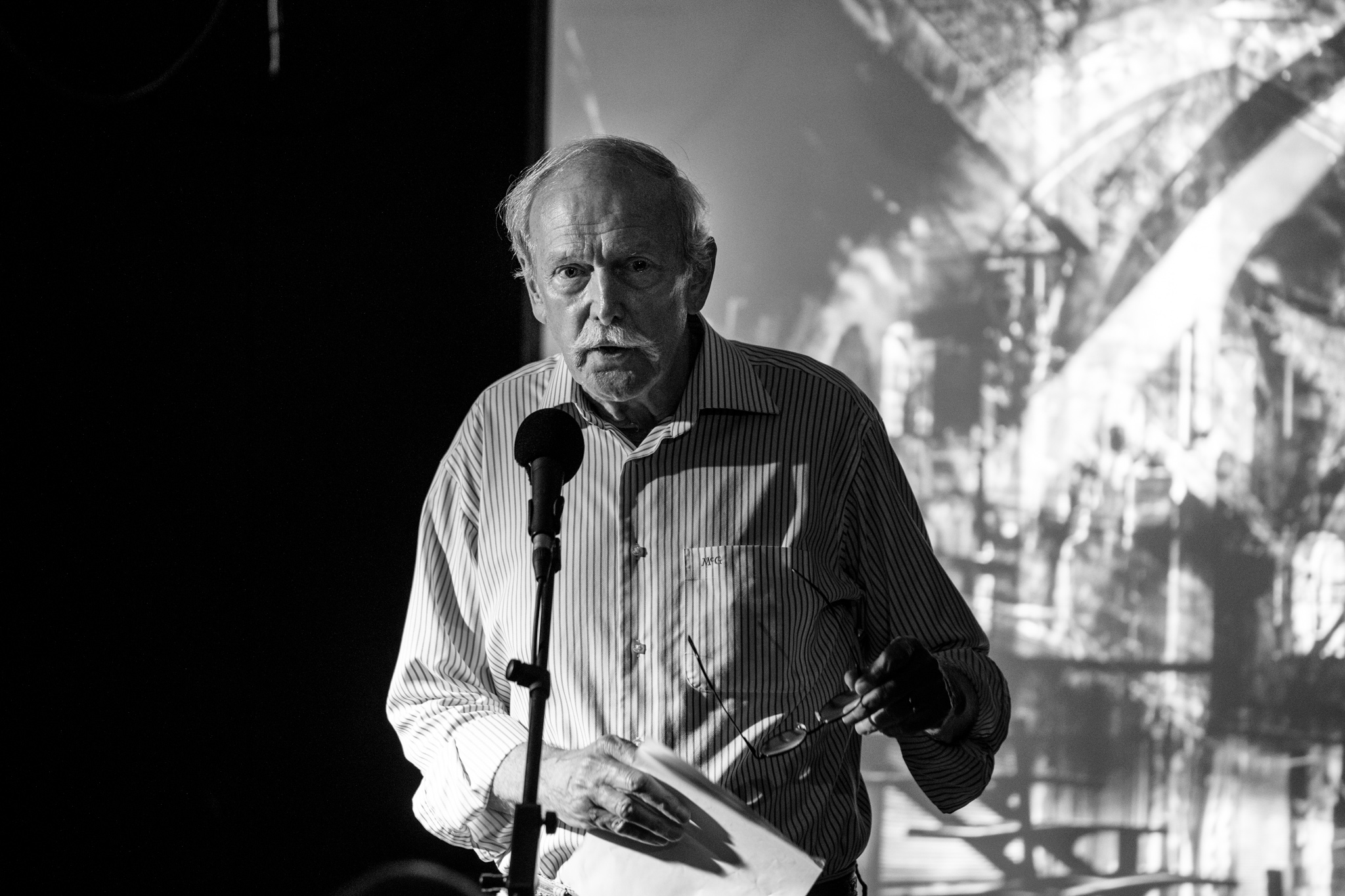
H.C. Ten Berge reading from his own work

Johannes Cornelis (Hans) ten Berge (born 24 December 1938 in Alkmaar) is a Dutch poet, prose writer, and translator, who publishes under the name H.C. ten Berge. He has won numerous awards throughout his career, among them the 1996 Constantijn Huygens Prize. He lives in Zutphen.
