= Marie Kessels =

Dutch writer and poet

Marie Kessels (born Nederweert, 11 December 1954) is a Dutch poet and prose writer. She received the Ferdinand Bordewijk Prize in 2009 for Ruw.

In 1999, she received the Multatuli Prize.

== Works ==
Kessels' novels are published by De Bezige Bij in Amsterdam.

- 1991 Boa
- 1993 Een sierlijke duik
- 1995 De god met gouden ballen
- 1998 Ongemakkelijke portretten
- 2002 Het nietigste
- 2005 Niet vervloekt
- 2009 Ruw
- 2012 Het Lichtatelier
- 2015 Brullen
- 2018 Veldheer Banner
- 2021 Levenshonger

== Awards ==
- 1992 Lucy B. en C.W. van der Hoogtprijs
- 1993 Charlotte Köhler Stipendium
- 1999 Multatuli Prize
- 2001 Anna Bijns Prize
- 2009 Ferdinand Bordewijk Prize

== Nominations ==
- 2010 Libris Prize
