= L. H. Wiener =

Dutch writer

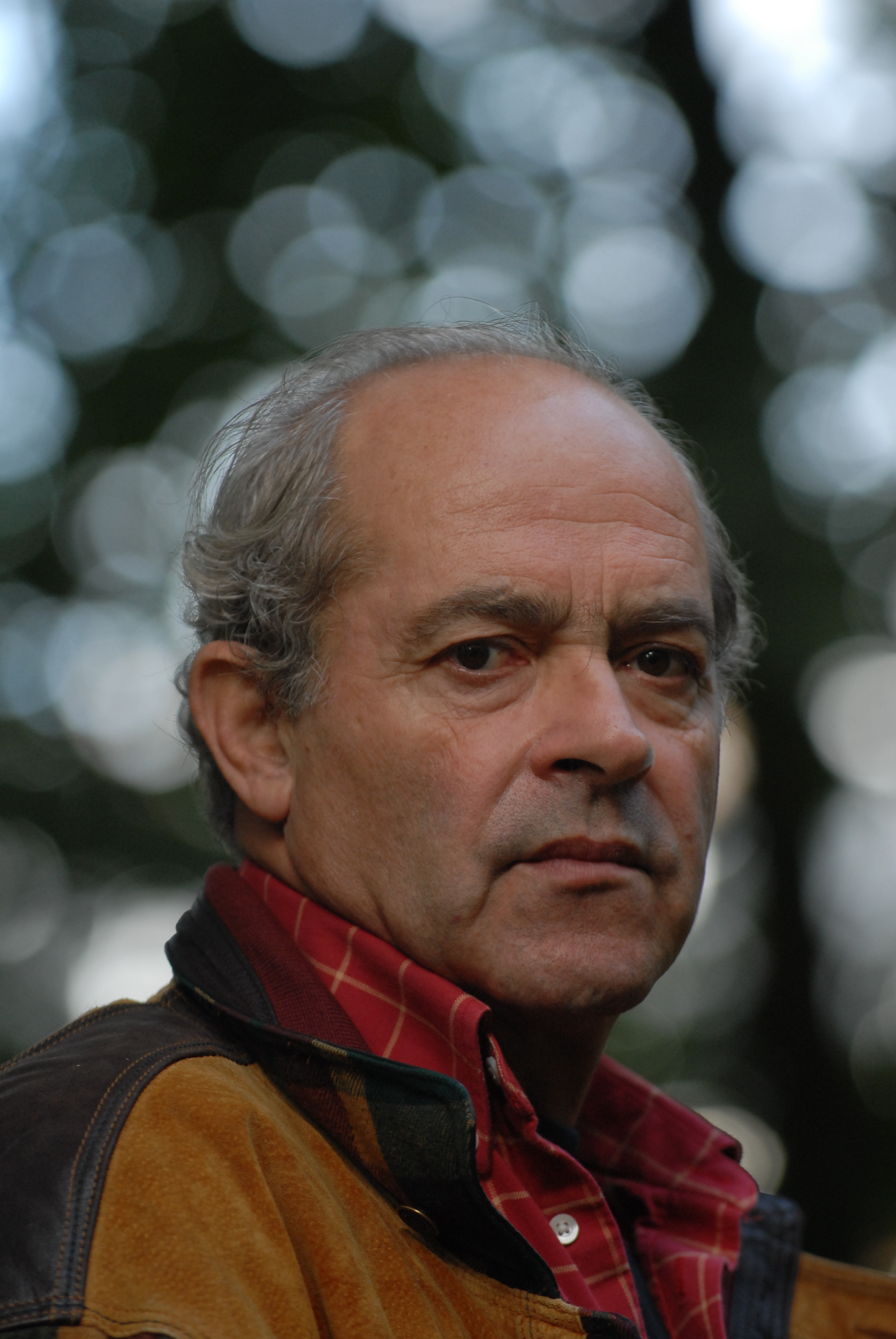
L.H. Wiener (Photo by J.J.H. Pop)

Lodewijk Willem Henri Wiener, writing as Lodewijk-Henri Wiener and (since 1980) L.H. Wiener (born February 16, 1945, in Amsterdam) is a Dutch writer.

Wiener debuted with stories in the Dutch literary journal Tirade in 1966 with Mijne Heren (Gentlemen!). In 1967 his first collection of stories, Seizoenarbeid Seasonal Work), was published, which immediately led to commotion. The holder of a beach pavilion in Zandvoort, who thought he was portrayed in one of those stories demanded that the work be withdrawn from the market. In a reprint his name was changed to that of the writer, "Wiener".

Wieners stories, based on a recipe of irony, self-mockery and cynicism, appeared mainly in Tirade and from 1980 in De Tweede Ronde, the literary magazines by publisher G.A. van Oorschot. It took more than thirty years for him to get some recognition: his second novel Nestor (2002) was awarded the Ferdinand Bordewijk Prijs in 2003. In 2003-2004 his collected stories appeared in two parts, which were generally discussed favorably in the press. Following the publication of the first volume, a Flemish magazine wrote: "A great writer, both stylistically and thematically, who urgently needs to be valued."

De verering van Quirina T. (The worship of Quirina T.) was nominated for the Libris Prize 2007. In 2015 Wiener turned 70 and the liber amicorum, LHW70 was offered. A few months later he was bestowed the Order of Orange-Nassau, being created a knight of that order.
