= OEK =

OEK or Oek can refer to:

- Orinats Yerkir, an Armenian political party
- Oek de Jong (born 1952), a Dutch novelist
- Palau National Congress, the national legislature of Palau
- Orchestra Ensemble Kanazawa, a chamber orchestra based in Kanazawa, Japan
