= Willem Witsen =

Dutch painter and photographer (1860–1923)

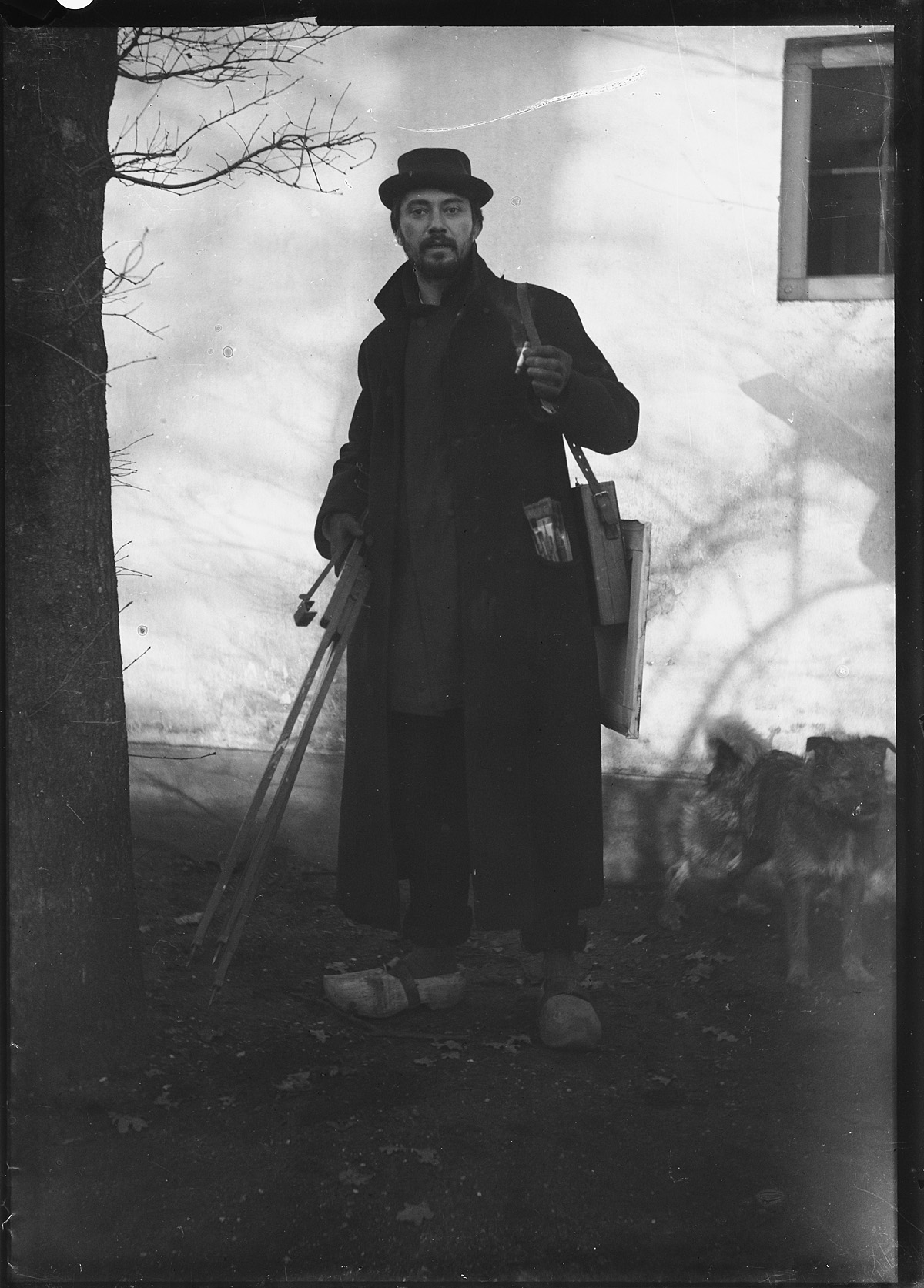
- Self-portrait of Witsen, 1894
- Born: 13 August 1860; Amsterdam, Netherlands
- Died: April 13, 1923 (aged 62); Amsterdam, Netherlands
- Occupations: Painter; photographer

Willem Arnoldus Witsen (13 August 1860 – 13 April 1923, Amsterdam) was a Dutch painter and photographer associated with the Amsterdam Impressionism movement. Witsen's work, influenced by James McNeill Whistler, often portrayed calm urban landscapes as well as agricultural scenes. He also created portraits and photographs of prominent figures of the Amsterdam art world, as well as other artists, such as French Symbolist poet Paul Verlaine.

== Life and work ==
=== Family ===
Willem Witsen was born in Amsterdam on 13 August 1860 in the wealthy ruling-class Witsen family, dating back to the governing families of the Dutch Golden Age, of whom Cornelis Jan Witsen and his son Nicolaes Witsen were members. His parents were Jonas Jan Witsen and Jacoba Elisabeth Bonekamp.

=== Formative years ===
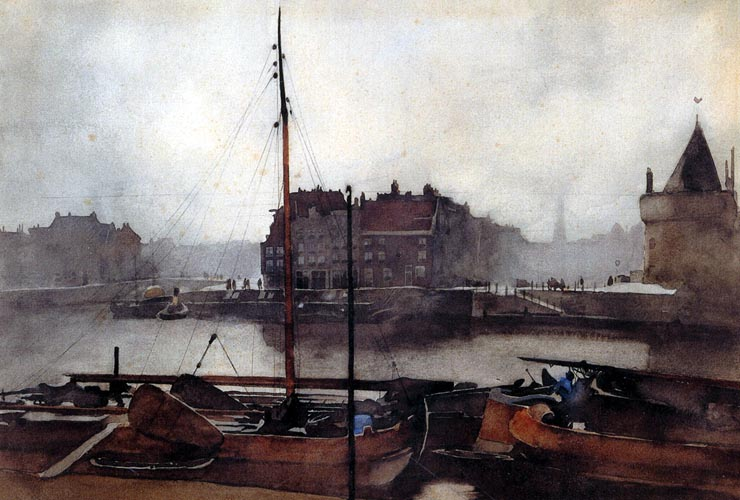
Prins Hendrikkade te Amsterdam, 1891

Witsen studied at academies in Amsterdam and Antwerp. As a student at the Amsterdam Rijksacademie van Beeldende Kunsten (State academy of visual arts), Witsen was a board member of the artists association Sint Lucas. He was the founder of the Nederlandse Etsclub (Dutch Etching Club).

Witsen belonged to the Tachtigers, a group of young artists who proclaimed the principle of l'art pour l'art Art for art's sake. The group influenced Dutch artistic and political life during the 1890s. Witsen wrote under a pseudonym in the literary magazine De Nieuwe Gids, which he also supported financially. His circle of friends included the painters George Hendrik Breitner, Isaac Israëls, and Jan Veth and the writers Lodewijk van Deyssel, Albert Verwey, Willem Kloos, and Herman Gorter.

During visits to London, Witsen became acquainted with the paintings of James McNeill Whistler, whose influence can be seen in Witsen's View of Victoria Embankment in London. Witsen worked in artist's colonies in Laren, Rotterdam, Wijk bij Duurstede and Ede. He made his studies of the small town Dordrecht while sitting in a boat, which gave him the special lower viewpoint which is characteristic of his works in that town.

After returning to Amsterdam, Witsen became a member of the artists circle Maatschappij Arti et Amicitiae. He was also a member of the artists association Sint Lucas, which is named after Saint Luke, patron of the painters.

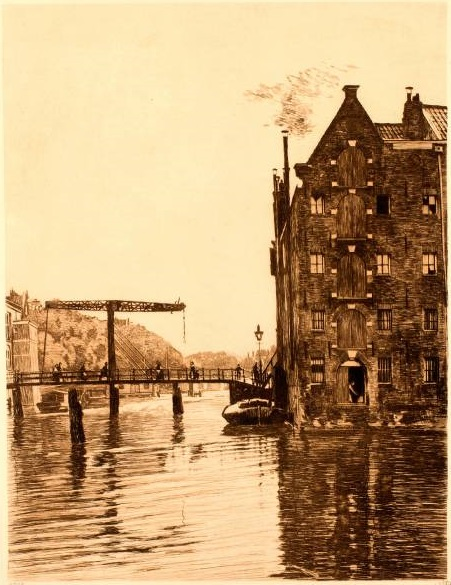
Uylenburg Amsterdam (drawing by Witsen, 1911)

Witsen's works are distinguishable from those of a contemporary European style, Impressionism. Their atmosphere is melancholy, depicting austere, wintery, dark scenes. The dark paintings did not sell well at his first solo exhibition, sponsored by the Amsterdam art dealer Van Wisselingh in 1895. A few years later, after his second exhibition, he proved successful with his prints depicting Rotterdam, Amsterdam, and painted views on Ede, and his watercolours were particularly successful.

=== Townscapes ===
His best works include serene views on Amsterdams, like those of the Herengracht and Leidsegracht, “Turfschepen in de Oude Schans” and “Gezicht op de oude Waal”. In 1911 Witsen purchased a barge in order to again work from a water-level standpoint.

Prizes granted to him at the World's Fair in Paris and St. Louis brought him to the attention of an international public. Here Witsen showed prints and paintings of Venice. He experimented with colour etching and continued with portraits and floral still lifes that he produced during his whole career. He visited the Art's Fair of 1915 in San Francisco and traveled to the Dutch East-Indies a few years before his death.

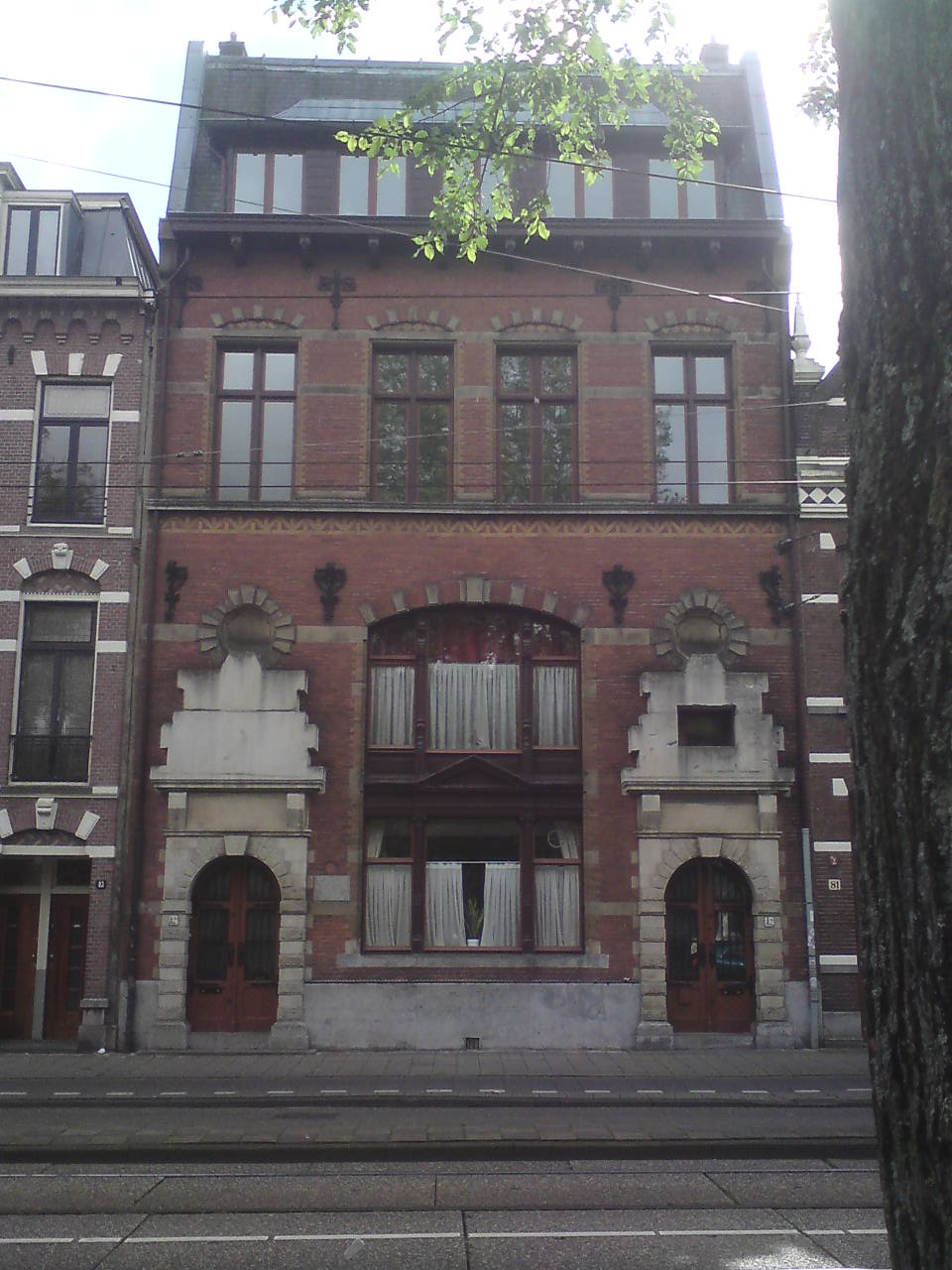
Witsenhuis

=== Witsen's house ===
Witsens studio which initially had also been used by Breitner, is situated at Oosterpark 82 in Amsterdam and is now a state-owned museum. The Witsenhouse (Witsenhuis) as it is called today has been restored to its original condition. For visits a written request is mandatory.

The late-romanticist Dutch writer Nescio portrayed the main character of his story Verliefdheid (Being in love) from March 1919 as the occupier of this house. The Dutch writer Marga Minco lived here from 1949 to 1970 with her husband Bert Voeten. Among the later occupiers of the house were the writers Jan Kal and Thomas Rosenboom.

Witsenhuis now is available as temporary housing for writers.

=== Photography and letters ===
- His original photographs show his experience in etching because of his close attention to perspective, composition and working in nuances of black and white.
- Witsen's correspondence which is important in both literary and art historical respect can be read on the site of the DBNL (a database of Dutch literature).
