= Ferdinand Bordewijk Prize =

Dutch literary award

The Ferdinand Bordewijk Prize (Dutch: F. Bordewijk-prijs) is a literary award, presented annually by the Jan Campert Foundation to the author of the best Dutch prose book. The prize was established in 1948 as the Vijverberg Prize, before being named after the Dutch author Ferdinand Bordewijk in 1979. As of 2024 the prize includes a cash prize of €6000.

== Winners ==
The winners include:

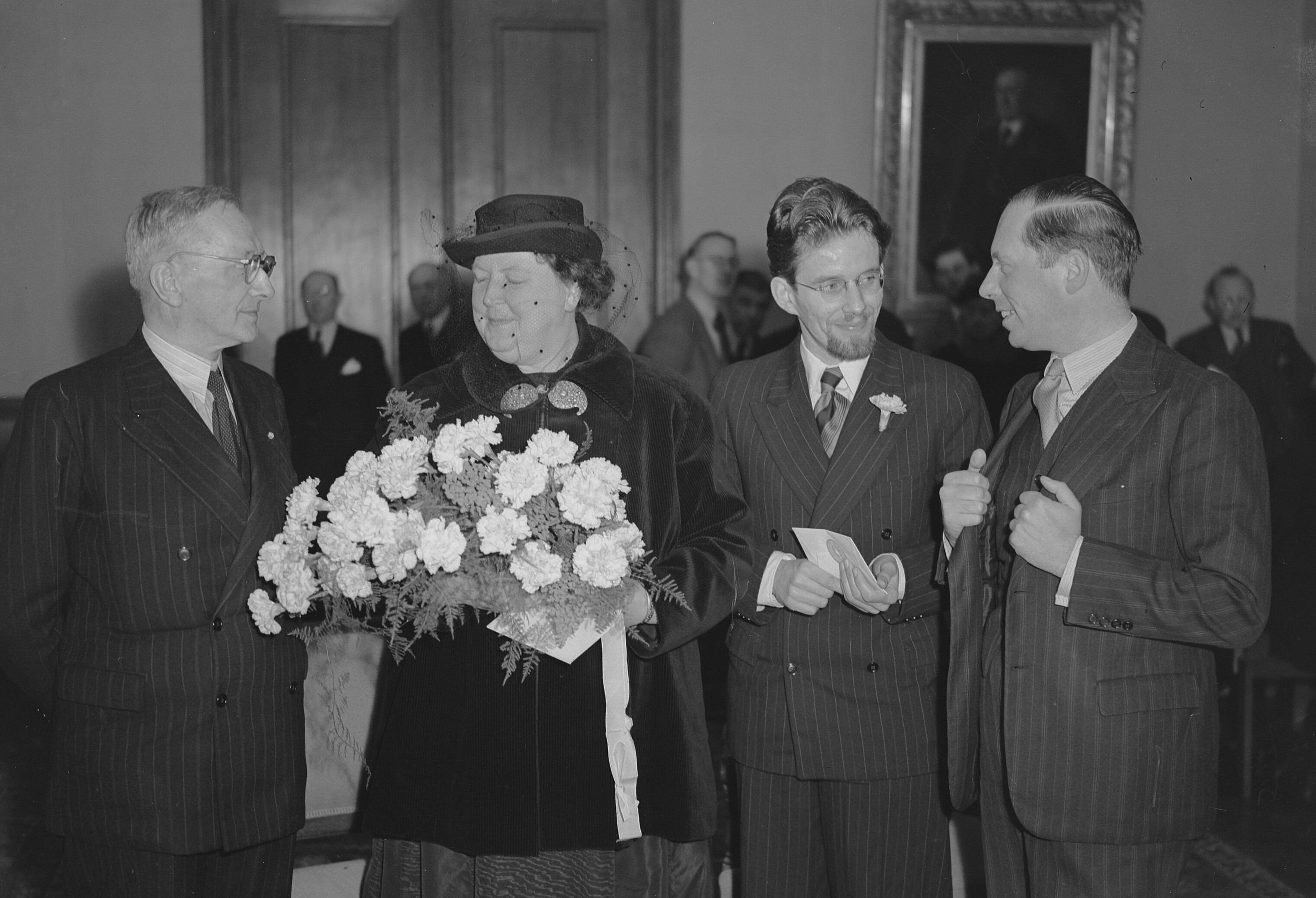
L-R: : F. Bordewijk, Jo Boer, Jan Elburg, unknown (11 January 1949)

=== Vijverberg Prize ===
- 1948 - Jo Boer for Kruis of munt
- 1949 - not awarded
- 1950 - Josepha Mendels for Als wind en rook
- 1951 - Theun de Vries for Anna Casparii of Het heimwee
- 1953 - Albert Helman for De laaiende stilte
- 1954 - Max Croiset for the play Amphitryon
- 1955 - not awarded
- 1956 - Albert van der Hoogte for Het laatste uur
- 1957 - not awarded
- 1958 - Marga Minco for Het bittere kruid
- 1959 - Jos. Panhuijsen for Wandel in het water
- 1960 - not awarded
- 1961 - Boeli van Leeuwen for De rots der struikeling
- 1962 - J.W. Holsbergen for De handschoenen van het verraad
- 1963 - Harry Mulisch for De zaak 40/61
- 1964 - Jacques Hamelink for Het plantaardig bewind
- 1965 - Alfred Kossmann for De smaak van groene kaas
- 1966 - Willem Frederik Hermans for Beyond Sleep (Nooit meer slapen) (not accepted)
- 1967 - Jeroen Brouwers for Joris Ockeloen en het wachten
- 1968 - Geert van Beek for De steek van een schorpioen
- 1969 - Ivo Michiels for Orchis militaris
- 1970 - Jaap Harten for Garbo en de broeders Grimm
- 1971 - Bert Schierbeek for Inspraak

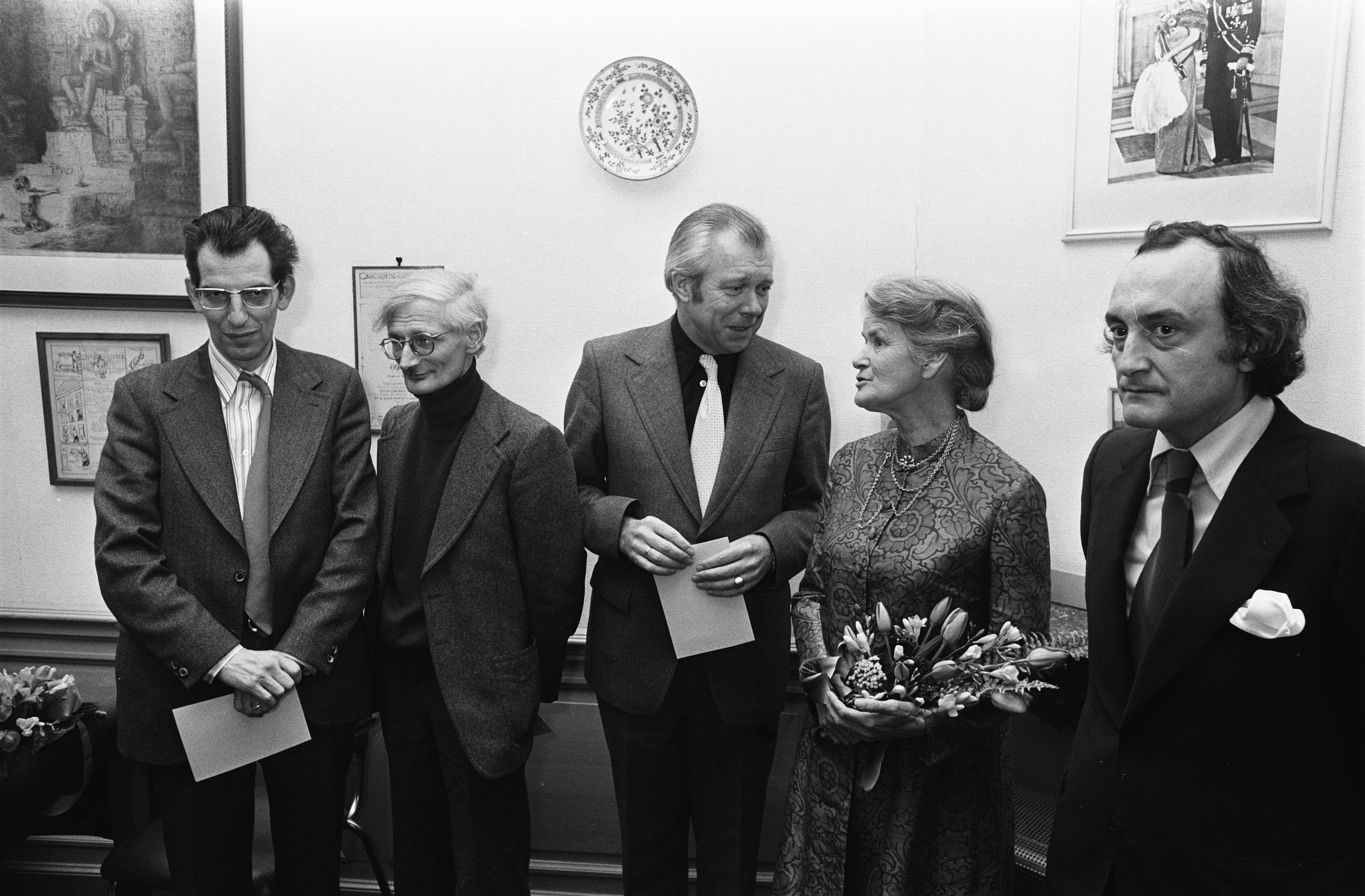
L-R: P.J. Piet Buijnsters, Dirkje Kuik), Piet Vink, M. Vasalis, Hugues C. Pernath (The Hague, 19 December 1974)

- 1972 - Anton Koolhaas for Blaffen zonder onraad
- 1973 - Kees Simhoffer for Een geile gifkikker
- 1974 - Dirkje Kuik (William D. Kuik) for De held van het potspel
- 1975 - Daniël Robberechts for Praag schrijven
- 1976 - Adriaan van der Veen for In liefdesnaam
- 1977 - J. Bernlef for De man in het midden
- 1978 - F.B. Hotz for Ernstvuurwerk

=== Ferdinand Bordewijk Prize ===
- 1979 - Willem Brakman for Zes subtiele verhalen
- 1980 - Oek de Jong for Opwaaiende zomerjurken
- 1981 - Cees Nooteboom for Rituals (Rituelen)
- 1982 - F. Springer for Bougainville
- 1983 - Willem G. van Maanen for Het nichtje van Mozart
- 1984 - Armando for Machthebbers
- 1985 - Maarten Biesheuvel for Reis door mijn kamer
- 1986 - A.F.Th. van der Heijden for De gevarendriehoek
- 1987 - Frans Kellendonk for Mystiek lichaam
- 1988 - Hermine de Graaf for De regels van het huis
- 1989 - Jeroen Brouwers for De zondvloed
- 1990 - Leo Pleysier for Wit is altijd schoon
- 1991 - Jan Siebelink for De overkant van de rivier
- 1992 - Jacq Firmin Vogelaar for De dood als meisje van acht
- 1993 - Robert Anker for De terugkeer van kapitein Rob
- 1994 - Louis Ferron for De walsenkoning
- 1995 - Nicolaas Matsier for Gesloten huis
- 1996 - Wessel te Gussinklo for De opdracht
- 1997 - J.J. Voskuil for Meneer Beerta en Vuile handen
- 1998 - Helga Ruebsamen for Het lied en de waarheid
- 1999 - Gijs IJlander for Twee harten op een schotel
- 2000 - Peter Verhelst for Tongkat; Een verhalenbordeel
- 2001 - Kees van Beijnum for De oesters van Nam Kee
- 2002 - Stefan Hertmans for Als op de eerste dag
- 2003 - L.H. Wiener for Nestor
- 2004 - Arnon Grunberg for De asielzoeker
- 2005 - Paul Verhaeghen for Omega Minor
- 2006 - Tommy Wieringa for Joe Speedboot
- 2007 - Marcel Möring for Dis
- 2008 - Doeschka Meijsing for Over de liefde
- 2009 - Marie Kessels for Ruw

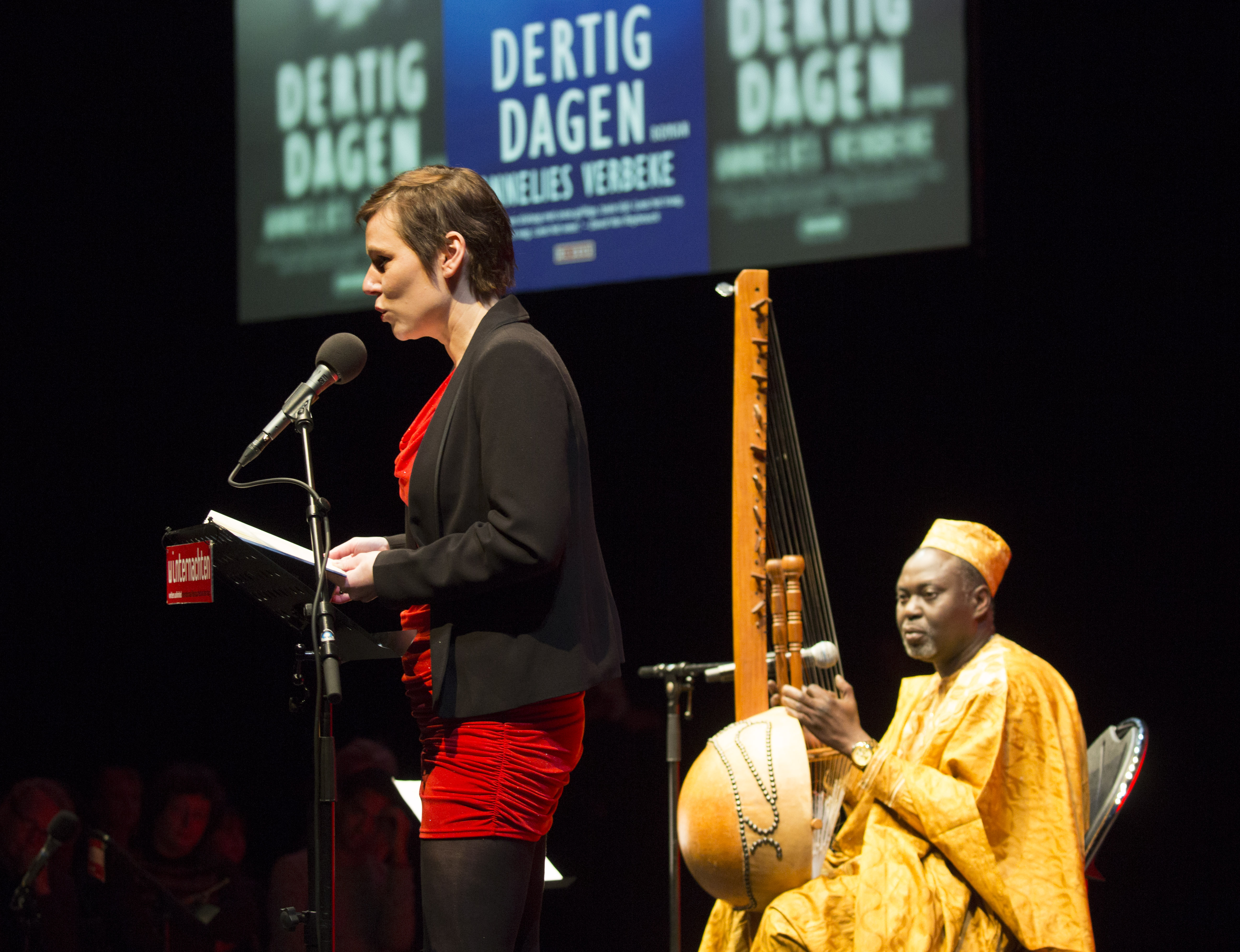
Annelies Verbeke (Bordewijkprijs 2015) and Lamin Kuyateh

- 2010 - Koen Peeters for De bloemen
- 2011 - Gustaaf Peek for Ik was Amerika
- 2012 - Stephan Enter for Grip
- 2013 - Oek de Jong for Pier en oceaan
- 2014 - Jan van Mersbergen for De laatste ontsnapping
- 2015 - Annelies Verbeke for Dertig dagen
- 2016 - Anton Valens for Het compostcirculatieplan
- 2017 - Jeroen Olyslaegers for WIL
- 2018 - Jan van Aken for De ommegang
- 2019 - Marente de Moor for Foon
- 2020 - Anjet Daanje for De herinnerde soldaat
- 2021 - Marieke Lucas Rijneveld for Mijn lieve gunsteling
- 2022 - Donald Niedekker, for Waarachtige beschrijvingen uit de permafrost
- 2023 - Tomas Lieske, for Niets dat hier hemelt
- 2024 - Marieke De Maré for Ik ga naar de schapen
- 2025 - Laura Broekhuysen for Magnetisch middernach
