= Vogels =

Vogels is a Dutch metonymic surname meaning "birds". It may refer to:

- Frida Vogels (1930–2026), Dutch writer
- Guillaume Vogels (1836–1896), Belgian painter
- Guus Vogels (born 1975), Dutch field hockey goalkeeper and Olympic gold medallist
- Henk Vogels (born 1973), Australian professional road bicycle racer
- John Vogels (born 1946), Dutch-born Australian politician
- Luke Vogels (born 1983), Australian rules footballer in the Australian Football League
- Mieke Vogels (born 1954), Flemish politician in the environmentalist party Groen
- Werner Vogels (born 1958), Dutch computer scientist, Chief Technology Officer and Vice President of Amazon

== See also ==
- Vogel (surname)
- De vogels van Holland ("The birds of Holland"), the first Dutch entry in the Eurovision Song Contest 1956
