= De Bezige Bij =

Dutch publishing house

- Parent company: WPG Uitgevers
- Founded: 1943
- Country of origin: Netherlands
- Headquarters location: Amsterdam
- Key people: Geert Lubberhuizen; Robert Ammerlaan; Hans Nijenhuis
- Publication types: Books
- Official website: http://www.debezigebij.nl/

De Bezige Bij ("the busy bee") is one of the most important literary publishing companies in the Netherlands.

== History ==
The company was founded illegally in 1943, during the German occupation of the Netherlands by Geert Lubberhuizen; its first publication was a poem by Jan Campert called De Achttien Dooden ("The eighteen dead"), which describes the execution of 15 resistance fighters and three communists. The poem was sold to raise money for Jewish children who were placed with Dutch families; when it was published, in the spring of 1943, Campert had already died in the Neuengamme concentration camp. When the German occupier rounded up students for the Arbeitseinsatz, Lubberhuizen hid in the attic of Maarten Vink, a surgeon, and ran the press from there.

The name is derived from one of Lubberhuizen's aliases, "Bas." After he had signed a note, "Bas (busy)," an English-speaking friend joked, "Bas, busy as a bee can be," which led to the current name.

In 1997, De Bezige Bij became part of the Weekbladpersgroep, though it was to keep its editorial independence and its cooperative structure.

In 2020, all employees of the Thomas Rap publisher left De Bezige Bij for more autonomy.

== Writers and poets ==
Writers and poets published by De Bezige Bij include:

- Remco Campert
- Hugo Claus
- Jan Cremer
- Louis Ferron
- W.F. Hermans
- Erik Menkveld
- Harry Mulisch
- Gerard Reve
- Jan Siebelink
- Ruth Thomas
- Simon Vinkenoog
- Tommy Wieringa
- Leon de Winter
