= Marga Minco =

Dutch journalist and writer (1920–2023)

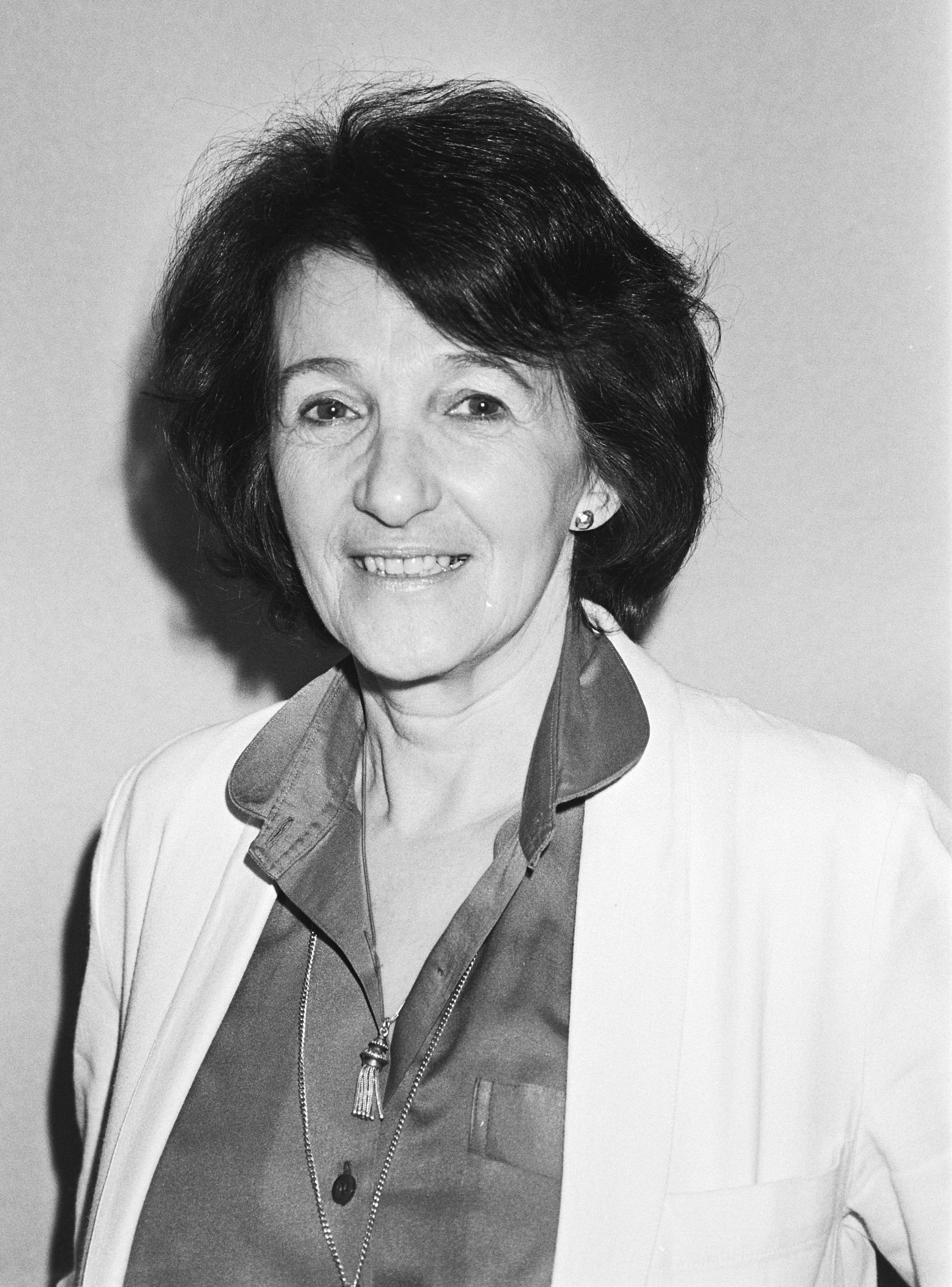
- Minco in 1981
- Born: Sara Menco; 31 March 1920; Ginneken, Netherlands
- Died: 10 July 2023 (aged 103); Amsterdam, Netherlands
- Resting place: Zorgvlied, Amsterdam
- Occupations: Journalist, writer
- Partner: Bert Voeten (m. 1945; died 1992)
- Children: 2, including Jessica Voeten
- Writing career
- Pen name: Marga Minco
- Language: Dutch
- Notable awards: Vijverberg Prize (1958); Constantijn Huygens Prize (2005); P.C. Hooft Award (2019)

Marga Minco (Dutch pronunciation: [ˈmɑrɣaː ˈmɪŋkoː]; born Sara Menco; 31 March 1920 – 10 July 2023), for some time known as Marga Faes, was a Dutch journalist and writer, and a Holocaust survivor. She married Dutch poet Bert Voeten.

== Early life and education ==
Marga Minco was born Sara Menco (Note: Her real surname was Menco, but an official accidentally switched the first vowel.) in Ginneken on 31 March 1920 to an Orthodox Jewish family. Her father was Salomon Minco (1887–1943), and was parnas (warden) in the local Jewish community; he may have worked as a salesman. Her mother was Grietje Minco-van Hoorn (1889–1943). She had a brother, David, and a sister, Bettie. The family moved to Breda, a predominantly Catholic town near her birthplace, when Sara was a young girl, and she went to the local public school.

== Career and WWII ==
Minco began work as a trainee journalist at the Bredasche Courant in 1938, first writing about films, and then eventually becoming a member of the editorial staff. Following the German invasion of the Netherlands in May 1940, and even before proclamation by the occupying forces of anti-Jewish measures, she was fired by order of the newspaper's German-sympathizing board.

In the early part of World War II Minco lived in Breda, Amersfoort, and Amsterdam. She contracted a mild form of tuberculosis and ended up being treated in hospitals in Utrecht and Amersfoort. In the autumn of 1942 she returned to Amsterdam and her parents, who were forced by the German occupiers to move into the city's Jewish Quarter.

Later in the war, Minco's parents, her brother, and her sister were all deported, and she was the only who managed to escape by running out of the back door. Having escaped arrest herself she spent the rest of the war in hiding, after bleaching her hair and obtaining a fake ID card. She was the family's only survivor. She also received a new name, Marga Faes, the first part of which she continued to use.

== Marriage and family ==
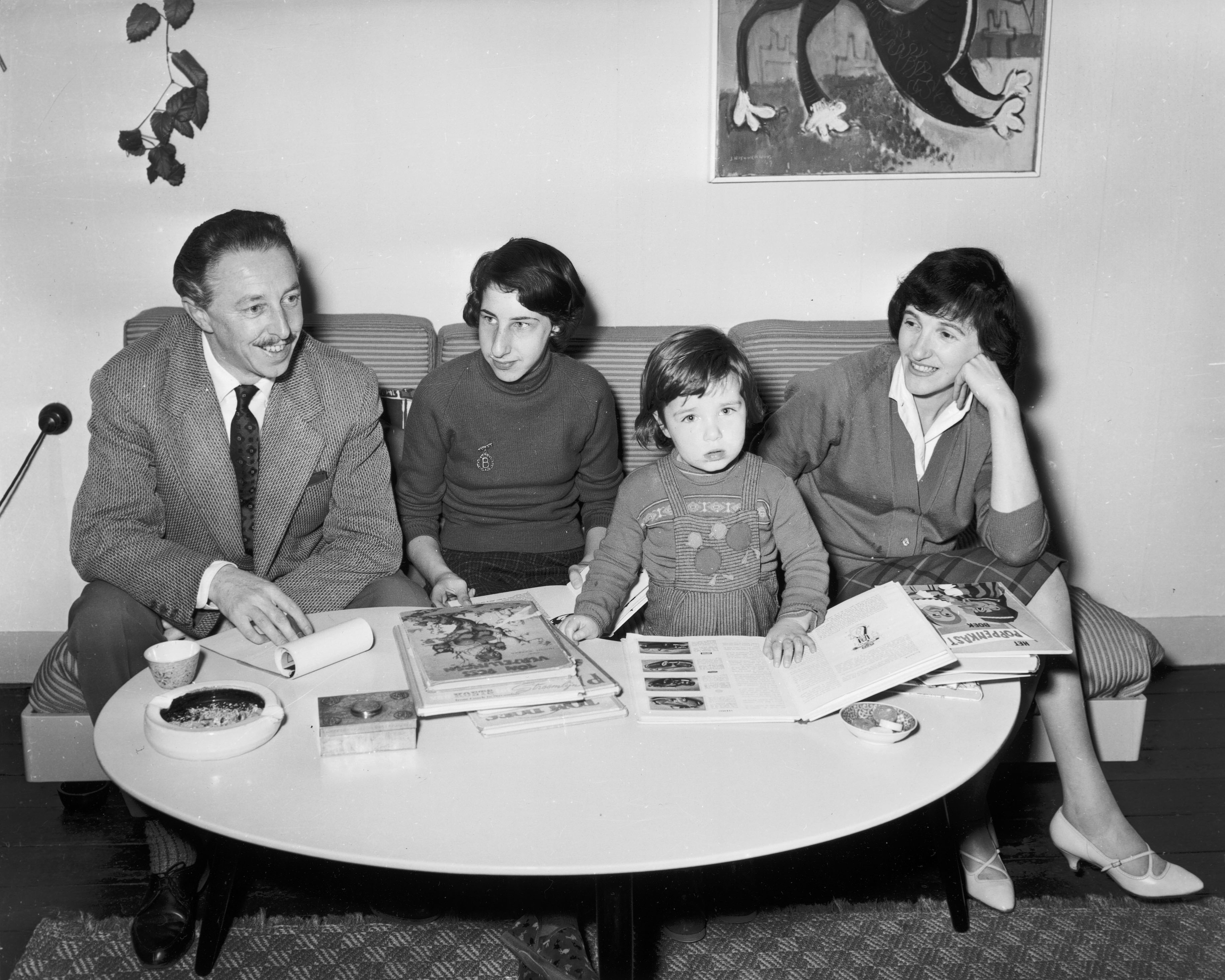
Minco, Voeten, daughters, 1958

Minco met poet, journalist and translator Bert Voeten (1918–1992), (Note: Full name Lambertus Hendrikus Voeten) in 1938 while working at the Bredasche Courant. Voeten was not Jewish and her parents were not pleased with the match while they were alive.

Voeten was forced to leave Breda in early 1940, along with thousands of other evacuees, fleeing across the border into Belgium. For three years, Voeten believed that Minco had been killed, until she managed to phone him in 1943.

Towards the end of the war, while Minco was in hiding under a false identity, and moved into an empty house in Amsterdam along with a group of artists and students, Voeten moved into the house. This house was portrayed in her novel Een leeg huis (The Empty House). In 1944 the couple had a daughter named Bettie after Minco's sister, who had died in the Holocaust.

They married after the war had ended, in August 1945, and both of them worked on a number of newspapers and magazines. In 1956 they had a second daughter, Jessica Voeten.

Minco and Voeten lived from 1949 to 1970 in Witsenhuis in Amsterdam.

Bert Voeten died in 1992, and is buried in the Zorgvlied cemetery.

== Later life and death ==
Minco turned 100 in March 2020, and died on 10 July 2023, at the age of 103.

== Writing ==
In 1957 Minco published her first book, Het bittere kruid ("Bitter herbs"), in which a nameless character goes through war experiences reminiscent of the author's. The title of her later book Een leeg huis ("An empty house") refers not only to the demolished house that the protagonist finds after emerging from hiding at the end of the occupation but also to the emptiness that she and her friend Yona experience in the postwar years, to which was added the distance and sometimes even hostility displayed by many people in the Netherlands towards returnees from the concentration camps. This phenomenon was further described by Minco in her collection of short stories, De andere kant ("The other side").

Existentialism imposes a special tightness on her work. The main characters, often survivors of the Holocaust, experience their lives as meaningless. Often, they have survived the war only by a series of coincidences, while their loved ones have been murdered. Frieda Borgstein, for example, in the novella De val ("The Fall"), manages by chance to survive the whole war without falling into the hands of the Nazis who have taken her husband's life. She dies, nevertheless, just before her 85th birthday, by falling accidentally into an unprotected well.

== Awards ==
- 1957 – Bureau voor Postreclame en Adressen De Mutator N.V., Short story prize for Het adress
- 1958 – Vijverberg Prize for Het bittere kruid
- 1999 – Annie Romein Prize, for her entire oeuvre
- 2005 – Constantijn Huygens Prize, for her entire oeuvre
- 2019 - P.C. Hooft Award, for her entire oeuvre

== Bibliography ==
- Het bittere kruid – een kleine kroniek (1957) (Bitter herbs – a little chronicle)
- Het adres (1957) (The address)
- De andere kant (collection) (1959) (The other side)
- Tegenvoeters (with Bert Voeten) (1961) (Antipodeans)
- Kijk 'ns in de la (1963) (Have a look in the drawer)
- Het huis hiernaast (1965) (The house next door)
- Terugkeer (1965) (Return)
- Een leeg huis (1966) (An empty house)
- Het bittere kruid / Verhalen / Een leeg huis (1968) (Bitter herbs / Stories / An empty house)
- De trapeze 6 (with Mies Bouhuys) (1968)
- De dag dat mijn zuster trouwde (1970) (The day my sister got married)
- Meneer Frits en andere verhalen uit de vijftiger jaren (1974) (Mr Frits and other stories from the fifties)
- Je mag van geluk spreken (in Bulkboek 46, 1975) (Talk about lucky)
- Het adres en andere verhalen (1976) (The address and other stories)
- Floroskoop – Maart (1979) (Floroscope – March)
- Verzamelde verhalen 1951–1981 (1982) (Collected stories)
- De glazen brug (Boekenweekgeschenk 1986) (The glass bridge)
- De glazen brug (with Loe de Jong): De joodse onderduik) (1988) (The glass bridge / Jews in hiding)
- De zon is maar een zeepbel, twaalf droomverslagen (1990) (The sun is but a soap bubble, twelve dream reports)
- De verdwenen bladzij – verhalenbundel voor kinderen (1994) (The missing page – stories for children)
- Nagelaten dagen (1997) (Bequeathed days)
- De schrijver (a literary relay with Harry Mulisch, Gerrit Komrij, Adriaan van Dis, Maarten 't Hart, Remco Campert, Hugo Claus, and Joost Zwagerman) (2000) (The writer)
- Decemberblues (2003)
- Storing (stories) (2004)
- Een sprong in de tijd (essay written for the Remembrance Day ceremony in Nieuwe Kerk, Amsterdam, and delivered by her daughter Jessica Voeten) (2008) (A leap in time)
