= Aster Berkhof =

Belgian writer (1920–2020)

Lode Van Den Bergh
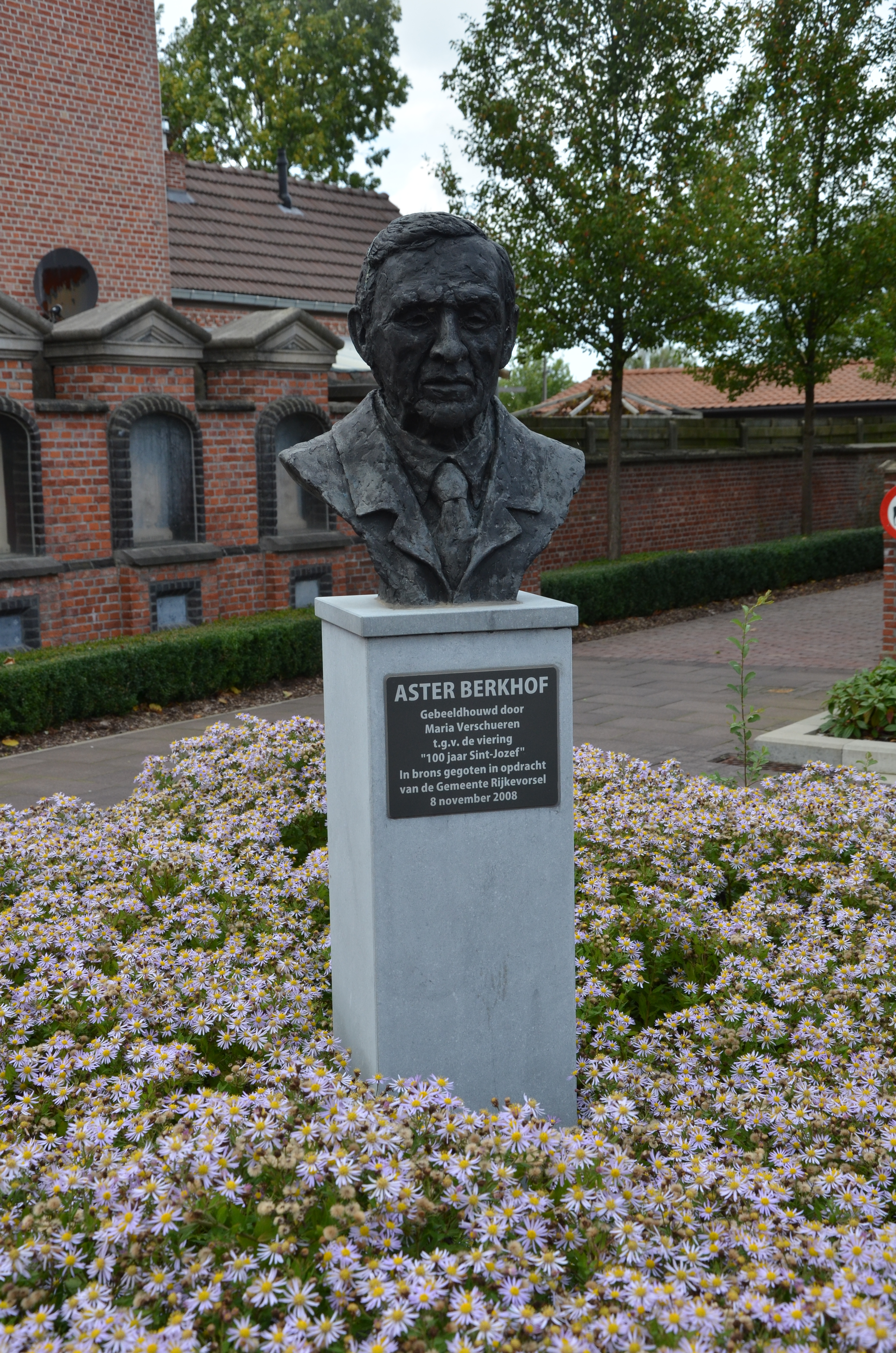
- Bust of Aster Berkhof in St-Jozef-Rijkevorsel
- Born: 18 June 1920; Rijkevorsel, Belgium
- Died: 29 September 2020 (aged 100); Brasschaat
- Other names: Aster Berkhof; Piet Visser
- Occupation: writer
- Spouse: Nora Steyaert (died 2020)

Lodewijk Paulina Van Den Bergh (18 June 1920 – 29 September 2020), known as Lode Van Den Bergh, also using the pseudonyms Aster Berkhof and Piet Visser, was a Belgian writer.

== Early life ==
Van Den Bergh was born in Rijkevorsel on 18 June 1920. He first went to the primary school in Rijkevorsel where his father was director. For his high school he went to the Klein Seminarie in Hoogstraten. He studied Germanic philology from 1938 until 1942 at the Catholic University of Leuven, and in 1946 he obtained a PhD in philosophy.

== Career ==
Van Den Bergh began his professional career as a scientific assistant at the Catholic University of Leuven, subsequently working as a teacher at the Royal Athenaea in Antwerp, Brussels and Koekelberg. Finally he became a professor at the Saint Ignatius Faculty in Antwerp.

== Partial bibliography ==
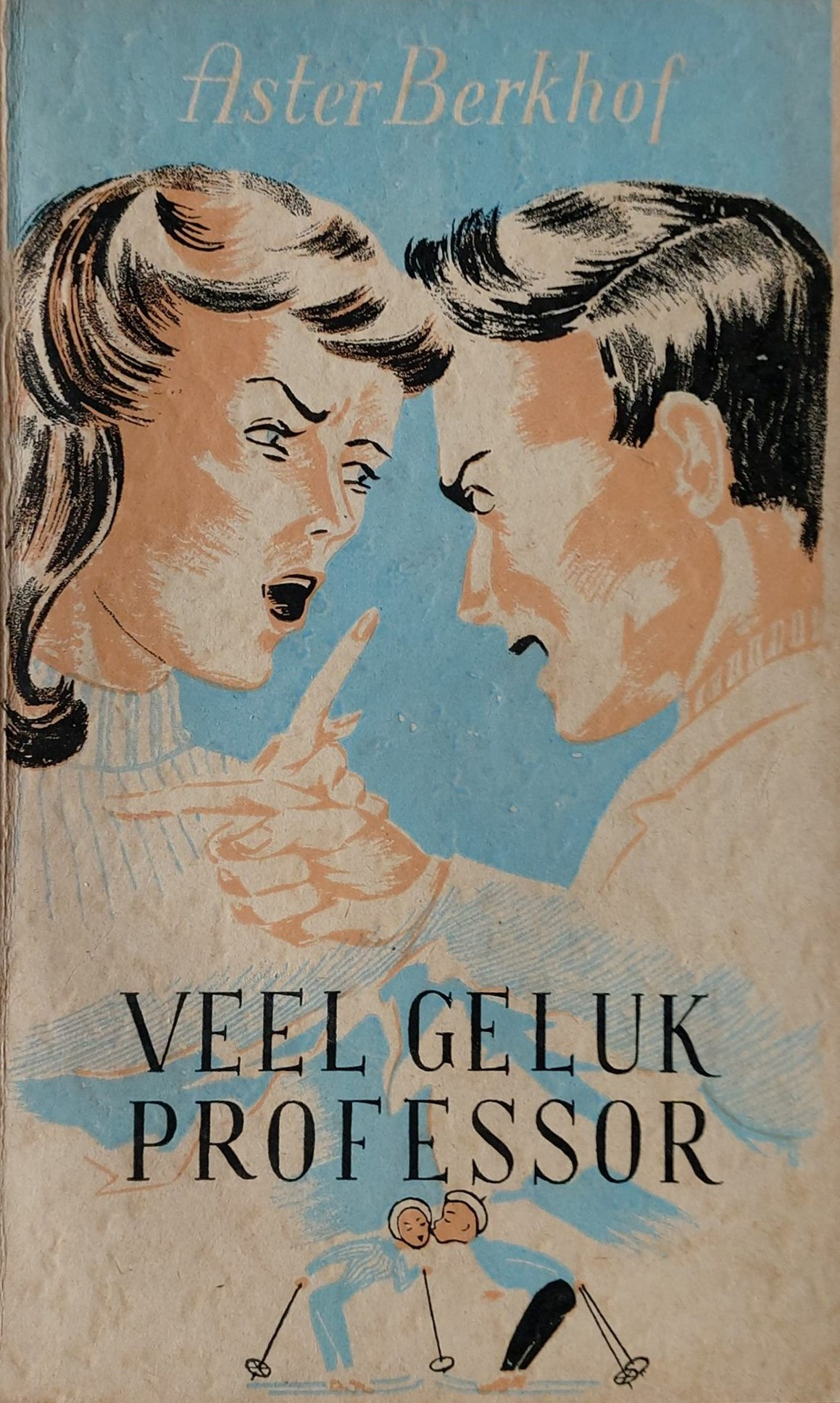
cover illustrated by Marthe van Coppenolle

- Rotsen in de storm, I en II (1947, novel)
- Veel geluk, professor ( 1948, novel)
- De heer in grijze mantel (1951, novel)
- Meester Groenevelt (1953, novel)
- Tijgers in Bengalen (1956, youth novel, also published under the pseudonym Piet Visser)
- De man in het midden (1957, novel)
- De heer des huizes (1958, novel)
- De Chinese jonk (1959, novel)
- Doden worden niet meer levend (1960, novel)
- Dagboek van een missionaris (1962, novel)
- Het huis van Mama Pondo (1972, novel)
- Lieve, mooie aarde (1977, novel)
- Leven in oktober (1978, novel)
- Toen wij allen samen waren (1978, novel)
- Mijn huis in de verte (1979, novel)
- De winners (1981, novel)
- De nacht van Muriel (1984, novel)
- Donnadieu (1991, novel)
- Octopus Dei (1992, novel)
- Over liefde gesproken (1993)
- Een meisje van niks (1994)
- Happy town (1994)
- Met Gods geweld (1996)
- Hoog spel (1997)
- Beminde schurken (1999)
- De winter komt (2001)
- Verborgen schade (2001)
- Geliefde kapelaan (2002)
- Daneelken (2003)
- Angelina (2004)
- Bagdad Palace (2005)
- De kleine revolver (2005)
- Tam tam (2006)
- Pipo (2007)
- De naam van de vader (2008)
- Alle verhalen (2009)
- Dodelijk papier (2010)
- De wet van Bas (2011)
- Aline (2013)
- De marmeren meisjes ( 2013)

== See also ==
- Flemish literature
