= Maarten Biesheuvel =

Dutch writer (1939–2020)

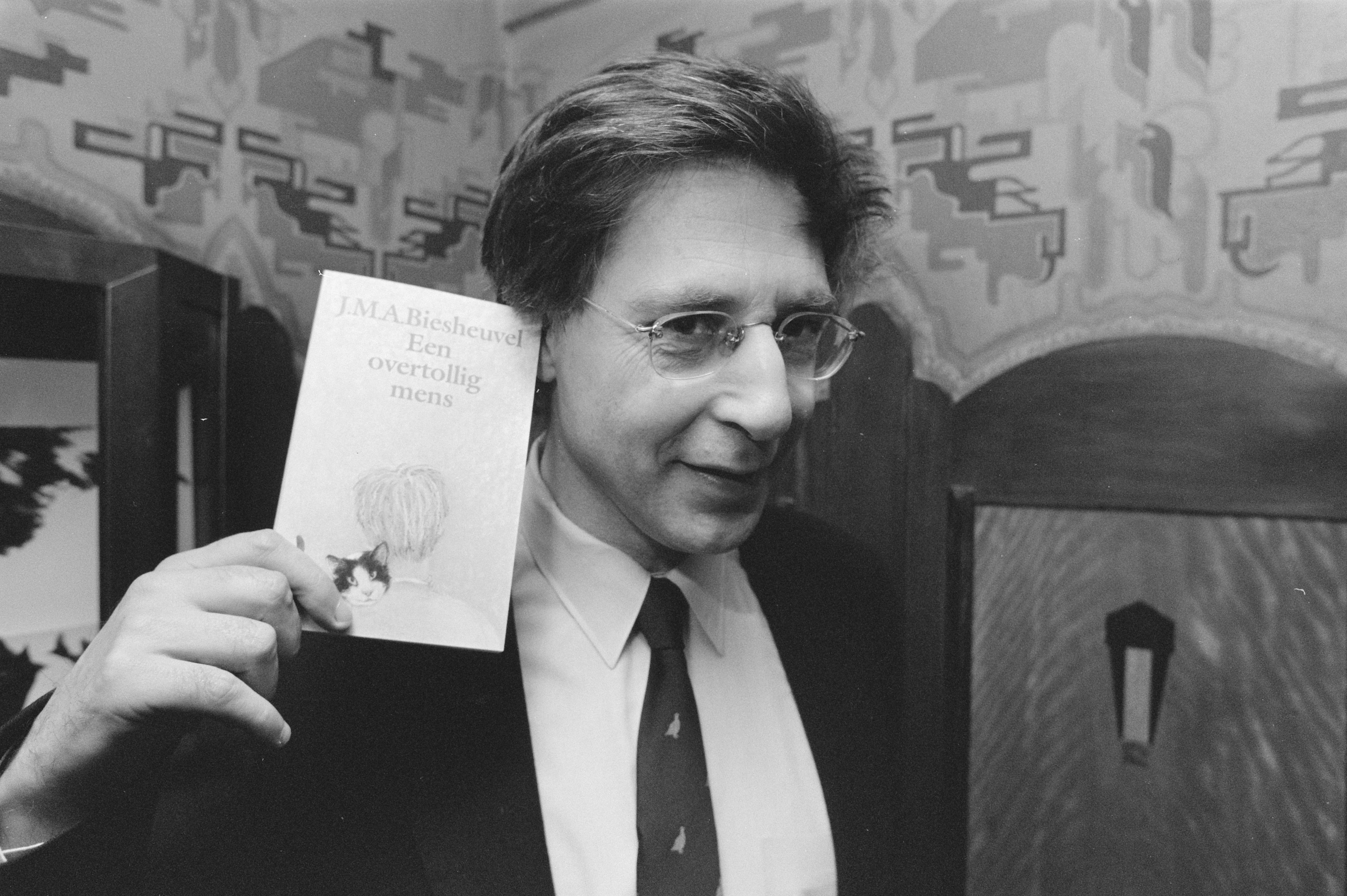
J.M.A. Biesheuvel with novella Een overtollig mens

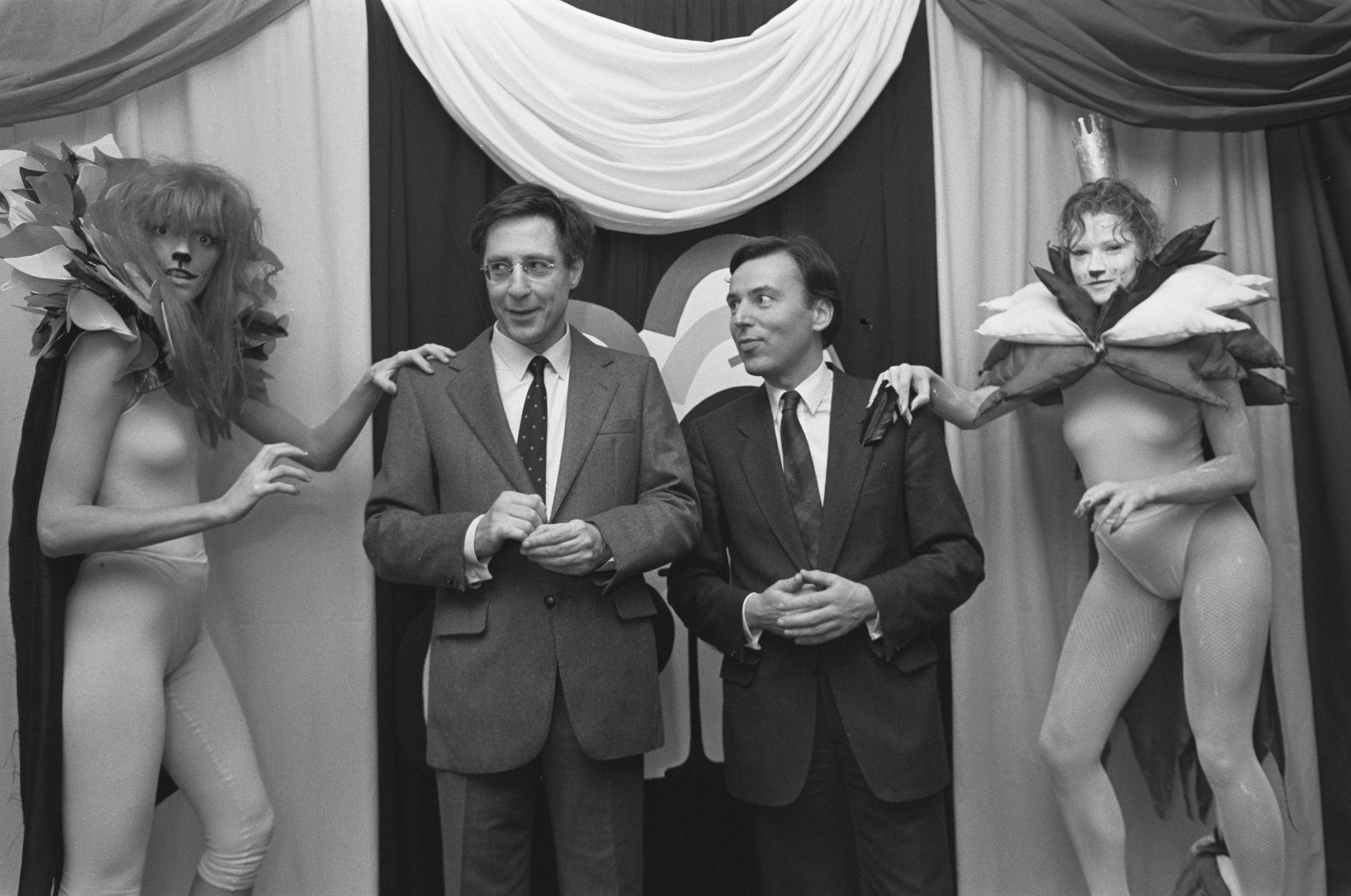
Biesheuvel and Elco Brinkman (1988)

Maarten Biesheuvel (23 May 1939 in Schiedam – 30 July 2020 in Leiden) was a Dutch writer of short stories and novellas. He made his literary debut in 1972 with the short story collection In de bovenkooi. He received the Ferdinand Bordewijk Prize in 1984 for Reis door mijn kamer. In 2007 he received the P. C. Hooft Award.

The Dutch J.M.A. Biesheuvelprijs was named after him and is awarded to the author of the best collection of short stories that has appeared in the Dutch language during the previous year.

From 1990 Biesheuvel's literary production slowed significantly due to a writer's block and manic-depressive phases.

He died in July 2020.

== Selected works ==
- In de bovenkooi (1972)
- Reis door mijn kamer (1984)
- Godencirkel (1986)

== Awards ==
- 1985: The Ferdinand Bordewijk Prize for Reis door mijn kamer
- 2007: The P. C. Hooft Award
- 2008: Knight of the Order of the Netherlands Lion
