= Koen Peeters =

Belgian writer

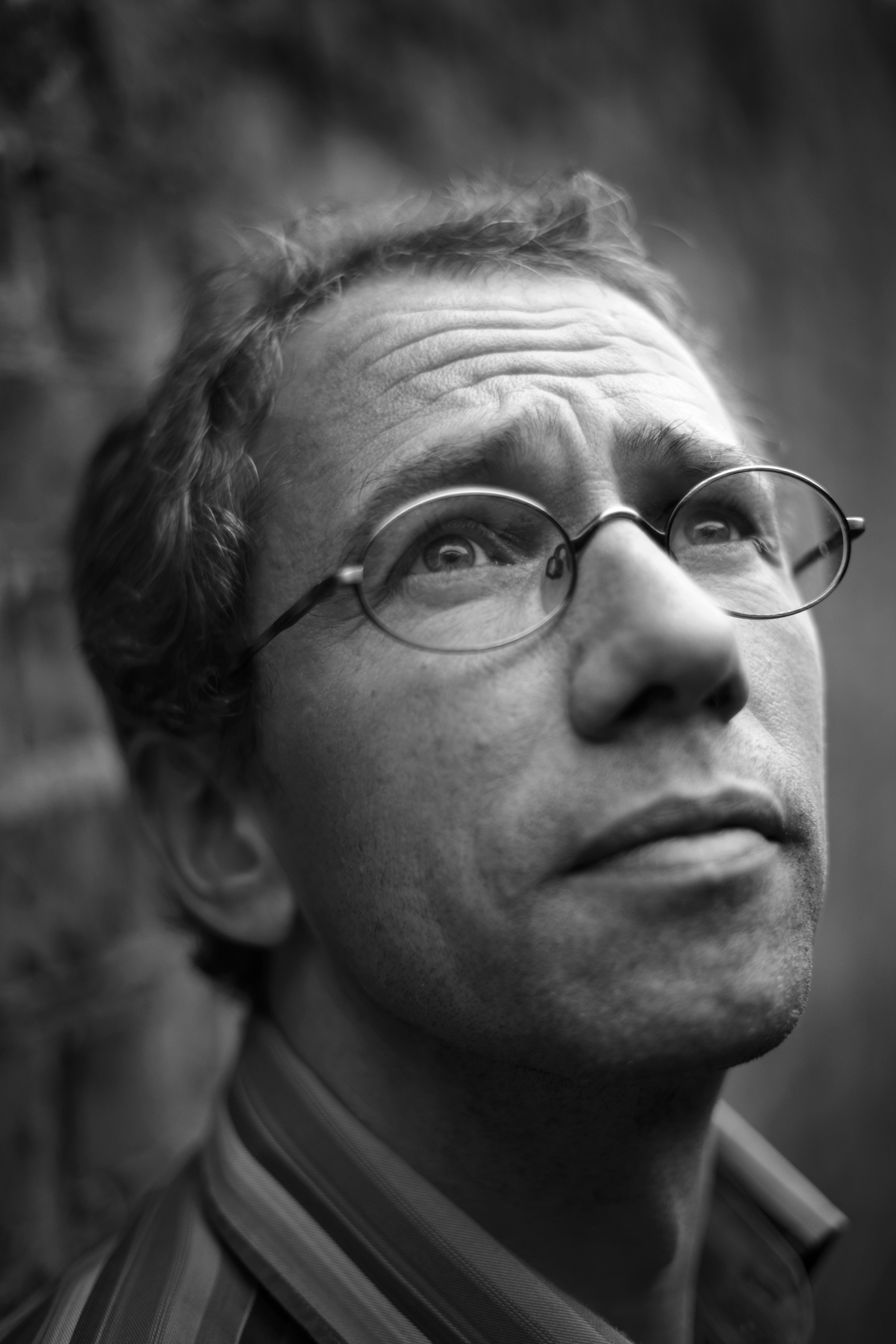
Koen Peeters.

Koen Peeters (Turnhout, 9 March 1959) is a Belgian writer. He was shortlisted for the Libris Literature Prize for his book the Great European Novel which has since been translated into multiple languages. He received the Ferdinand Bordewijk Prize in 2010 for De bloemen. In 2017 he received the ECI Literature Prize for De mensengenezer.
