= View of the Victoria Embankment in London =

Print by Willem Witsen

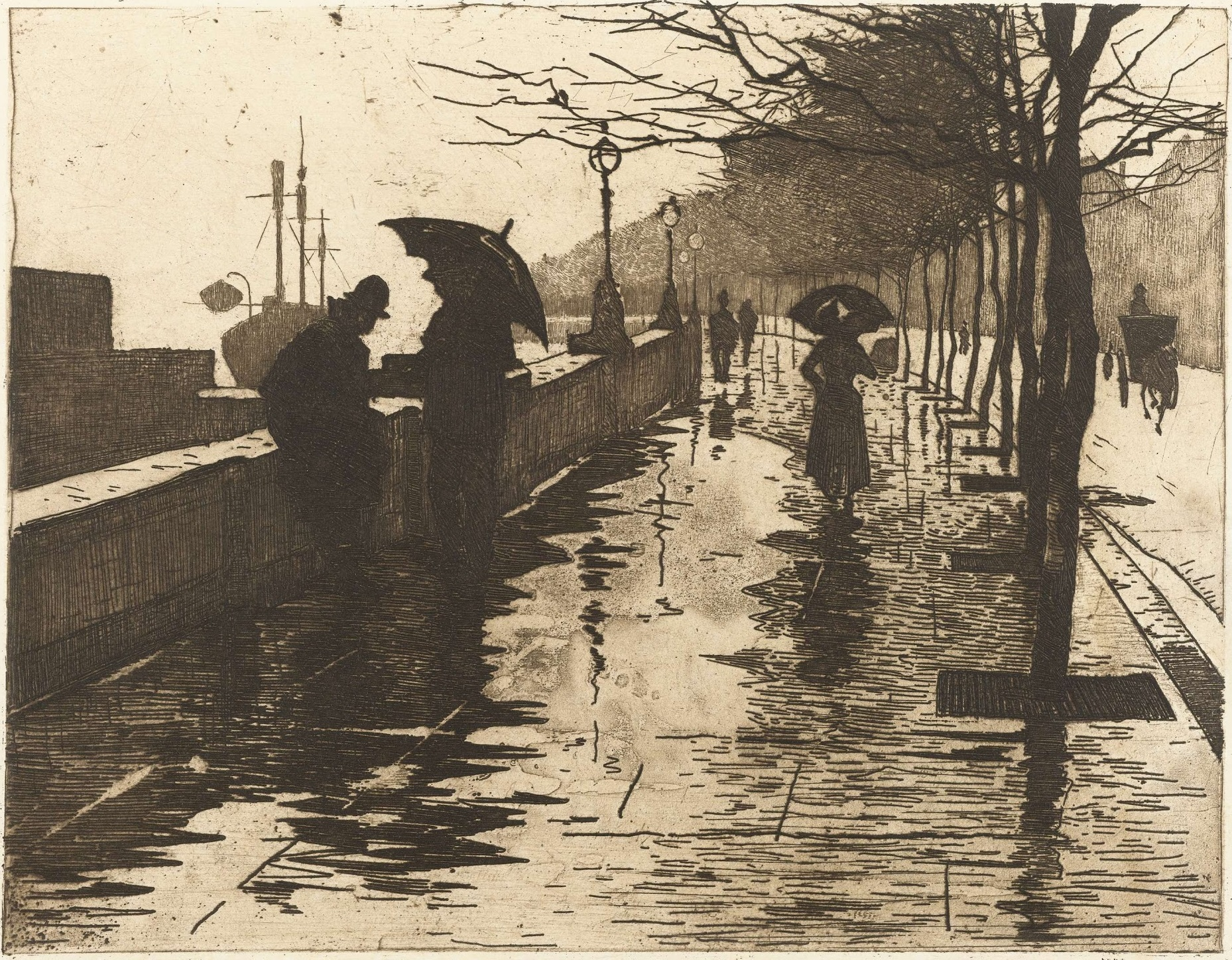

View of Victoria Embankment in London (Dutch - Gezicht op Victoria Embankment in Londen) is an 1890 etching by the Dutch artist, etcher and photographer Willem Witsen. It shows a foggy autumnal scene on Victoria Embankment in London - he stayed in the city between 1888 and 1891 with only a few interruptions. He also produced prints of the scene in 1906 and 1908, one of which is in the Rijksmuseum.
