= Louis Ferron =

Dutch novelist and poet (1942–2005)

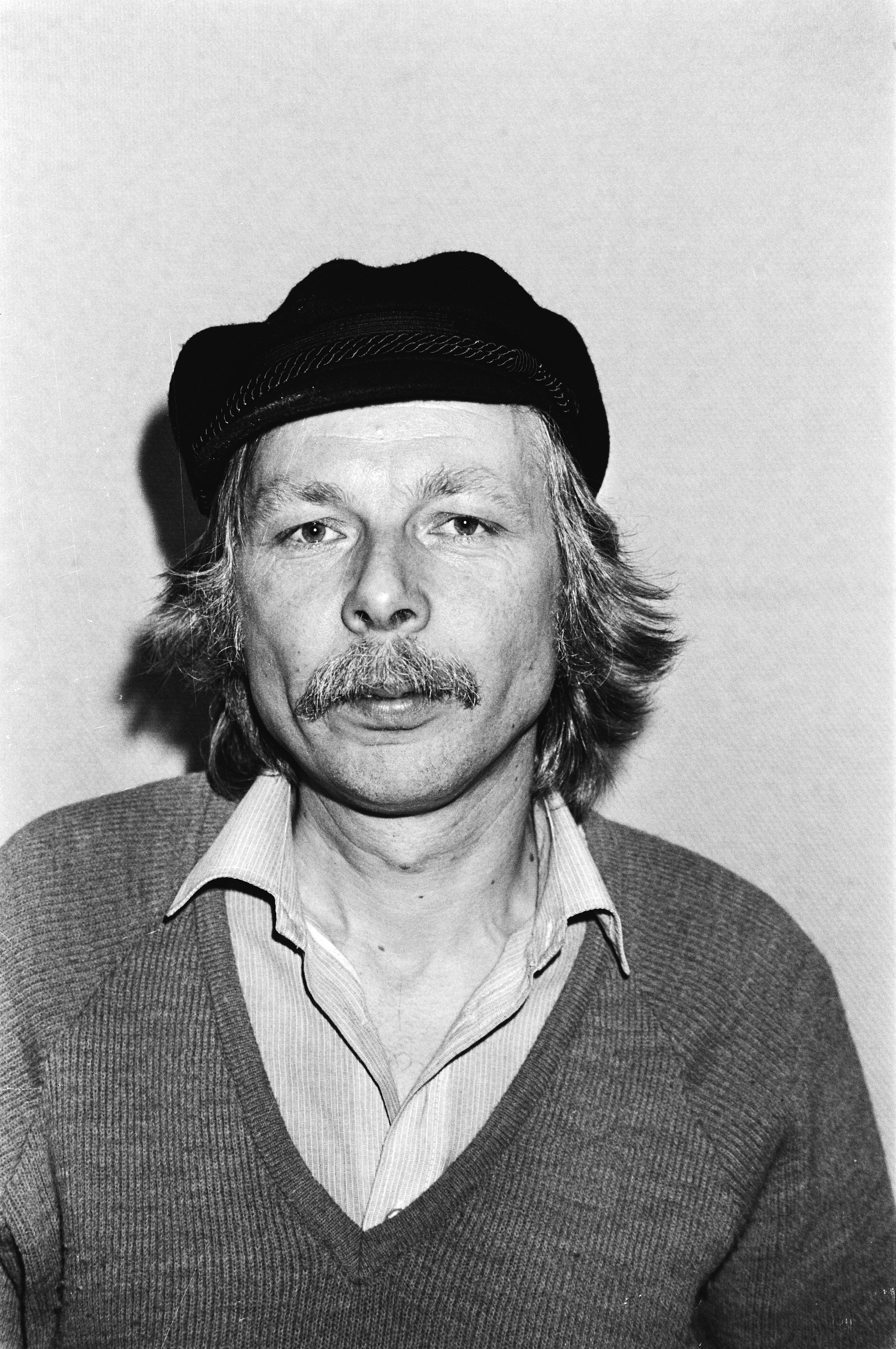
- Born: Karl Heinz Beckering; 4 February 1942; Leiden, Netherlands
- Died: 26 August 2005 (aged 63); Haarlem, Netherlands
- Occupations: Poet, novelist, translator
- Spouse: Lilian Blom
- Writing career
- Period: 1962–present
- Notable awards: Multatuliprijs (1977), AKO Literatuurprijs (1990), Ferdinand Bordewijk Prijs (1994), Constantijn Huygens Prijs (2001)
- Website: www.louis-ferron.nl

Louis Ferron (born Karl Heinz Beckering; 4 February 1942 – 26 August 2005) was a Dutch novelist and poet.

== Biography ==
Louis Ferron was born in Leiden out of an adulterous relationship between a married German soldier and a waitress from Haarlem named Ferron. His father took the boy to Germany, and when he was killed shortly before the end of World War II, Karl Heinz was raised in Bremen as the stepchild of his father's widow. After the war he returned to the Netherlands, where he was renamed Aloysius (Louis) Ferron. He was raised by his mother's parents, but also stayed with foster families and in children's homes. Initially he desired to be a painter; at age 18, he married a daughter of the author Lizzy Sara May, and his wife encouraged him to become a writer.

Ferron's literary debut was a set of poems called "Kleine Krijgskunde," in the May 1962 issue of the literary journal Maatstaf, which also published, in August 1965, his short story "Ergens bij de grens." His first booklength publication was the poetry collection Zeg nu zelf, is dit ontroerend?, published in 1967. In 1974 he published a second book of poetry, Grand Guignol. After that he published mainly prose work, for which he is known best. Ferron was also a translator of James Baldwin and Vladimir Nabokov.

He died of intestinal cancer, three days after receiving the first copy of his last novel, Niemandsbruid.

== Themes ==
Ferron's work involves topics found in the work of Friedrich Nietzsche and Sigmund Freud; he was influenced by Thomas Bernhard and especially by Louis-Ferdinand Céline. In his novels, Ferron unmasks ideologies and romantic illusions to uncover the chaos of desire and secret formal conventions. A number of critics call his work postmodern, especially considering his presentation of reality as unknowable. In Turkenvespers (1977), for instance, the protagonist (an unreliable narrator to begin with), finally no longer knows whether he himself exists independently, or is only an actor in the imagination of a perverse movie director.

In his treatment of historical subjects Ferron also thematizes a rather unclear reality. Especially German history fascinated him; the novels Gekkenschemer, Het stierenoffer, and De keisnijder van Fichtenwald are often referred to as his "Teutonic trilogy," and were republished in a single volume in 2002.

== Awards ==
- Multatuliprijs, 1977, De Keisnijder van Fichtenwald of de Metamorfose van een Bultenaar
- AKO Literatuurprijs, 1990, Karelische nachten
- Ferdinand Bordewijk Prijs, 1994, De walsenkoning
- Constantijn Huygens Prijs, 2001, for his entire oeuvre

== Select bibliography ==
- Gekkenschemer. Amsterdam: De Bezige Bij. 1974. ISBN 90-234-0486-6.
- Het stierenoffer. Amsterdam: De Bezige Bij. 1975. ISBN 90-234-0506-4.
- De keisnijder van Fichtenwald: of de metamorfosen van een bultenaar. Amsterdam: De Bezige Bij. 1977. ISBN 90-234-0524-2.
- Turkenvespers. Amsterdam: De Bezige Bij. 1977. ISBN 90-234-0598-6.
- Karelische nachten. Amsterdam: De Bezige Bij. 1989. ISBN 90-234-3103-0.
- De walsenkoning: een duik in het autobiografische diepe. Amsterdam: De Bezige Bij. 1993. ISBN 90-234-3333-5.
- Een aap in de wolken: de niet zo vrolĳke ballade van een monter ingezet kunstenaarschap. Amsterdam: De Bezige Bij. 1995. ISBN 90-234-3491-9.
- Niemandsbruid. Amsterdam: De Bezige Bij. 2005. ISBN 90-234-1764-X.
