= Willem G. van Maanen =

Dutch journalist and writer

Willem Gustaaf van Maanen (30 September 1920 – 17 August 2012) was a Dutch journalist and writer. He received the Ferdinand Bordewijk Prijs in 1983 for Het nichtje van Mozart and was the 2004 recipient of the Constantijn Huygens Prize. He was born in Kampen.
