= Sander Kollaard =

Dutch writer

- Born: 1961 (age 64–65); Amstelveen, Netherlands
- Occupation: Writer
- Writing career
- Language: Dutch
- Genres: Novel, short story
- Notable work: Uit het leven van een hond
- Notable awards: Libris Prize (2020)

Sander Kollaard (born 1961) is a Dutch writer. He is best known for his novel Uit het leven van een hond (transl. A Dog's Day), which won the Libris Prize in 2020.

== Life and work ==
Kollaard was born in Amstelveen and studied history in Amsterdam. Since 2006 he has lived and worked in the Swedish countryside, in a former vicarage.

He made his debut in 2012 with the short story collection Onmiddellijke terugkeer van uw geliefde. His first novel, Stadium IV, was published in 2015 and was selected as Book of the Month by Dutch television programme De Wereld Draait Door.

In 2019 Kollaard published Uit het leven van een hond. The novel won the Libris Prize in 2020. In 2021 it also won the Peter van Straaten Psychologieprijs of Leiden University.

Kollaard's work has been translated into several languages. Michele Hutchison's English translation of Stadium IV, published as Stage Four, won the 2019 Vondel Prize for translation from Dutch.

== Selected bibliography ==
Kollaard's books include:

- 2012: Onmiddellijke terugkeer van uw geliefde
- 2015: Stadium IV
- 2018: Levensberichten
- 2019: Uit het leven van een hond
- 2021: De laatste dag van de koning
- 2021: De kleuren van Anna
- 2022: Lentehonger
- 2024: Bona fide. Een kerstverhaal
- 2025: Einde verhaal
