= Jacq Firmin Vogelaar =

Dutch writer

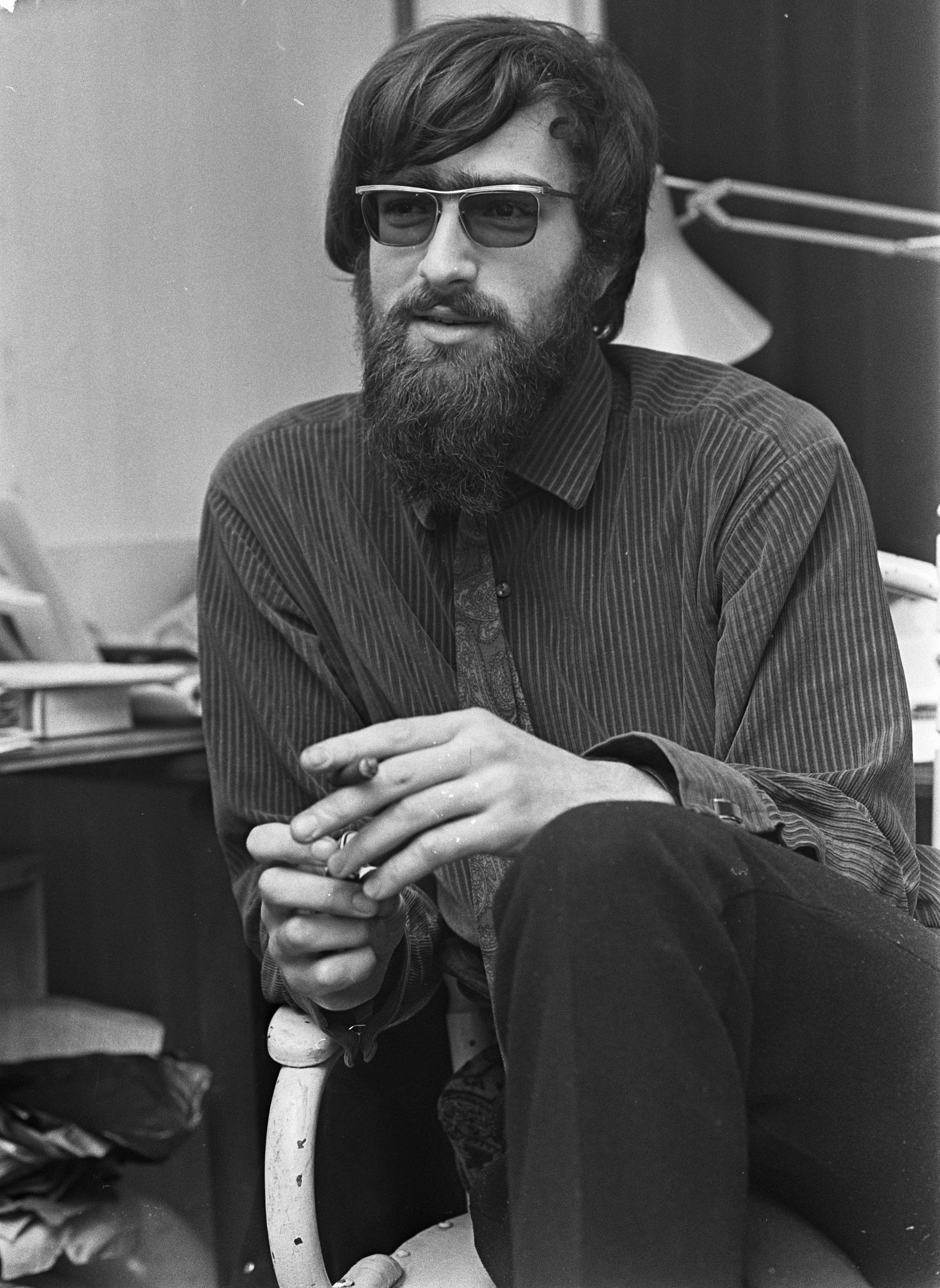
Jacq Vogelaar (1968)

Franciscus Wilhelmus Maria Broers (3 September 1944, Tilburg – 9 December 2013, Utrecht) was a Dutch writer, who published using the pseudonym Jacq Firmin Vogelaar. In 1992 he won the Ferdinand Bordewijk Prijs for his novel De dood als meisje van acht. In 2006 he won the Constantijn Huygens Prize for his collected works.

== Works ==
- Vogelaar, Jacq Firmin (1965). Parterre, en van glas (poetry). p. 67.
- Vogelaar, Jacq Firmin (1965). De komende en de gaande man (short stories). p. 189.
- Vogelaar, Jacq Firmin (1966). Anatomie van een glasachtig lichaam (novel). p. 308.
- Vogelaar, Jacq Firmin (1967). Vijand gevraagd, 'n boerenroman (novel). p. 157.
- Vogelaar, Jacq Firmin (1968). Gedaantewisseling of 'n metaforiese muizenval (novel). p. 192.
- Vogelaar, Jacq Firmin (1968). Het heeft geen naam ('pieces'). p. 159.
- Vogelaar, Jacq Firmin (1970). Kaleidiafragmenten (novel). p. 160.
- Vogelaar, Jacq Firmin; et al. (1972). Kunst als kritiek. Voorbeelden van een materialistiese kunstopvatting. p. 391.
- Vogelaar, Jacq Firmin (1974). Konfrontaties: Kritieken en Kommentaren 1 (essays). p. 190.
- Vogelaar, Jacq Firmin; et al. (1976). Ik in Kapitaal, in: Het mes in het beeld (essay).
- Vogelaar, Jacq Firmin (1978). Raadsels van het rund (novel). p. 546.
- Vogelaar, Jacq Firmin (1980). Alle vlees (novel). p. 308.
- Vogelaar, Jacq Firmin (1983). Oriëntaties: Kritieken en Kommentaren 2 (essays). p. 277.
- Swart, Koba (1984). Nora, Een Val. De Bezige Bij. p. 132. ISBN 978-9023408895. (using female pseudonym Koba Swart)
- Vogelaar, Jacq Firmin (1986). Het geheim van de bolhoeden (children's book). Bezige Bij. p. 231. ISBN 9789023475477.
- Vogelaar, Jacq Firmin (1987). Terugschrijven (essays). Bezige Bij. p. 334. ISBN 9789023409786.
- Vogelaar, Jacq Firmin (1988). Verdwijningen: oefeningen (novel). p. 184.
- Vogelaar, Jacq Firmin (1991). Speelruimte (essays). Perdu. p. 76. ISBN 9789051880267.
- Vogelaar, Jacq Firmin (1991). De dood als meisje van acht (novel). De Bezige Bij. p. 295. ISBN 9789023432128.
- Vogelaar, Jacq Firmin (1993). Striptease van een ui (essays). Bezige Bij. p. 287. ISBN 9789023432814.
- Vogelaar, Jacq Firmin (1994). Weg van de pijn (novel). De Bezige Bij. p. 267. ISBN 9789023434023.
- Vogelaar, Jacq Firmin (1997). Uit het oog: beeldverhalen (essays). De Bezige Bij. p. 255. ISBN 9789023435969.
- Vogelaar, Jacq Firmin (1997). Klaaglied om Ka (poetry). Herik. p. 40. ISBN 9789073036567.
- Vogelaar, Jacq Firmin (1998). Inktvraat (poetry). Bezige Bij. p. 117. ISBN 9789023447788.
- Vogelaar, Jacq Firmin (1998). Meer speelruimte (essays). De Bezige Bij. p. 340. ISBN 9789023437390.
- Vogelaar, Jacq Firmin (2001). Taats onder mannen (short stories). Bezige Bij. p. 286. ISBN 9789023400332.
- Vogelaar, Jacq Firmin (2005). Over Kampliteratuur (essays/scholarly). De Bezige Bij. p. 683. ISBN 9789023414971.
- Vogelaar, Jacq Firmin (2010). Je zit niet alleen in je vel: fictieve genres (essays). Querido. p. 337. ISBN 9789021485355.
