= Rijkevorsel =

- Municipality
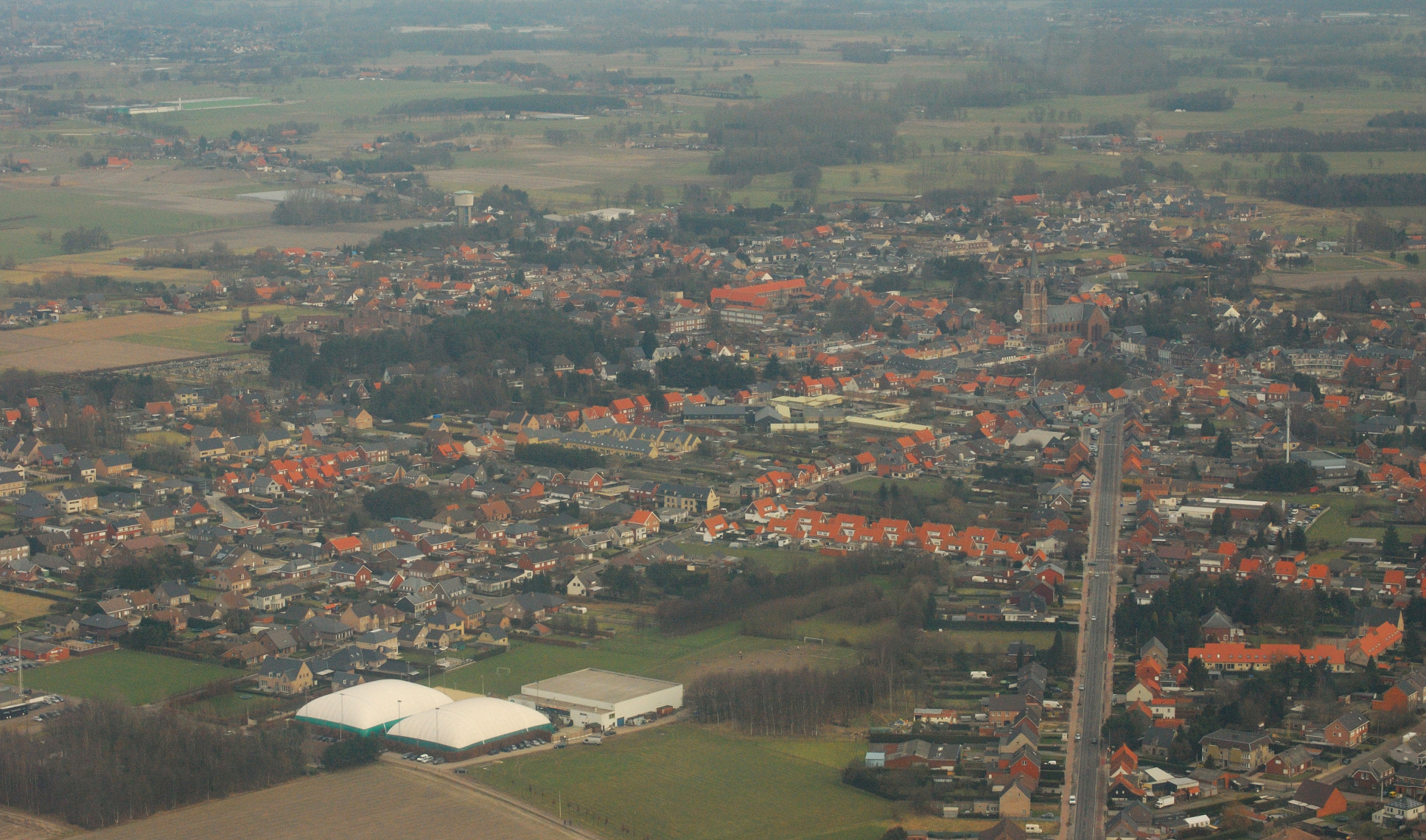

- Flag Coat of arms

- Location of Rijkevorsel in the province of Antwerp
- Interactive map of Rijkevorsel
- Location in Belgium
- Coordinates: 51°21′N 04°46′E
- Country: Belgium
- Community: Flemish Community
- Region: Flemish Region
- Province: Antwerp
- Arrondissement: Turnhout

Government
  - Mayor: Dorien Cuylaerts (N-VA)
  - Governing parties: N-VA, CD&V

Area
  - Total: 46.84 km^{2} (18.09 sq mi)

Population (2025-01-01)
  - Total: 12,560
  - Density: 268.1/km^{2} (694.5/sq mi)
- Postal codes: 2310
- NIS code: 13037
- Area codes: 03, 014
- Website: www.rijkevorsel.be

Rijkevorsel (Dutch pronunciation: [ˌrɛikəˈvɔrsəl]) is a municipality located in the Belgian province of Antwerp. The municipality comprises the town of Rijkevorsel, Achtel, Sint-Jozef-Rijkevorsel and Gammel. In 2021, Rijkevorsel had a total population of 12,262. The total area is 46.79 km^{2}.

== History ==
Rijkevorsel, Vaishak, Voirssele, Forsela in 1194. Recent archaeological finds at the Willow Street attest to human presence in the late Stone Age, the bronze and Iron Age and the Roman times. A large cemetery with cremation (urnfield) on the Helhoekheide may point to a first settlement being present here already before the beginning of our era.

== Notable inhabitants ==
- Aster Berkhof, writer
- Leo Pleysier, writer
- George Kooymans, composer, musician, producer, guitarist at Golden Earring rockband
- Toon Aerts, Belgian cyclist born in Malle and currently lives in Rijkevorsel. 2016 European champion.
