= Martha Van Coppenolle =

Belgian artist and book illustrator (1912–2004)

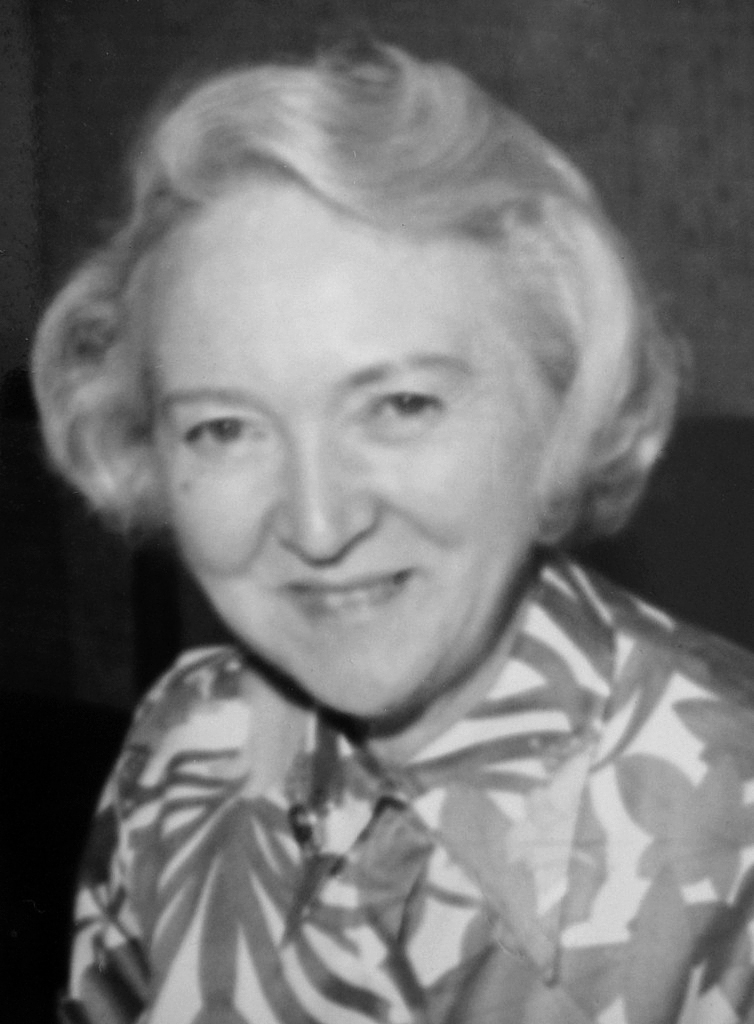
- Martha Van Coppenolle
- Born: 13 April 1912; Merksem
- Died: 22 September 2004 (aged 92); Antwerp
- Resting place: Cemetery of Berchem
- Education: Technical Institute for Applied and Decorative Arts-Sint Maria
- Style: Russian Avant-Garde
- Spouse: Herman De Meester
- Awards: Gold medal from the City of Antwerp

Martha Van Coppenolle (13 April 1912 – 22 September 2004) was a Belgian artist and book illustrator. She was cited by the 'Letterenhuis - Museum' (the Antwerp Museum of the Literary Arts) to be one of the most prolific and influential of all Flemish illustrators. She created pen and ink drawings for over 40 novels and children's books, particularly during the period between 1930 and 1960 within the Flemish region. Her early work leaned strongly towards the Russian Avant-Garde Movement, although she would equally be at ease, creating very colourful and detailed fairy tale illustrative motifs, for certain nursery rhymes when needed. Aside from illustrating, she was equally involved in creating graphic design, ceramic sculptures, oil paintings and furniture design concepts. In the later stages of her life, she gained international recognition as a stained glass artist.

== Early life and influences ==
Martha Van Coppenolle was born in Merksem (Antwerp) Belgium, on 13 April 1912. She was the first daughter of Octaaf Van Coppenolle and Helena Van Immerzeel. As of the early age of seven, she became fascinated by art in all its forms and at the age of fourteen, she created her first oil on canvas painting. Though unfinished, the painting is supposedly a mirrored self-portrait. In 1927, she painted her second canvas, a still-life flower arrangement. Van Coppenolle was mainly influenced by her contemporary artist friends. However, she had a particular preference towards most of the British Pre-Raphaelite painters and illustrators of that period, together with the current wave of Avant-Gardism sweeping the continent at that time.

== Political activity ==
As of 1914, Van Coppenolle and her mother fled to London England, in order to avoid World War One's atrocities on the Belgian battlefield, where her father was an Officer in the Army. In 1915 while still in London, her sister Maria was born. Upon their return to Belgium in 1917, Martha immediately continued her schooling and passion for art. During the 1930s, she became briefly and moderately involved with the Flemish National Movement, therefore designing mainly for the Vlaamsche Boekenweek and Het Boek van Vlaanderen in 1936. Furthermore, she was responsible for creating the prestigious six-part series about the history of Flanders, published by the Standaard Boekhandel. In 1943 she married Herman De Meester, a Secretary for the Government of Belgium.

== Death and legacy ==
Van Coppenolle died on 22 September 2004 in Antwerp at the age of 92. Her body was cremated and her ashes stored at the Cemetery of Berchem. She was survived by her two sons, Antony De Meester, a renowned Canadian graphic designer, typographer and 20th century decorative arts expert, and Axel De Meester, a reputable Belgian photographer and granddaughter Marissa De Meester former model and actress.

== Book illustrations and other graphic works ==
Her first major success and award came in 1930, during the many years of study at the 'Technical Institute for Applied and Decorative Arts-Sint Maria' in Antwerp, where she won the prestigious gold medal from the City of Antwerp, in a province wide competition. The competition's aim, was to create a banner-flag representing the city's image at the 'International World Exposition', taking place in Antwerp at the time. After graduating from Sint-Maria with the highest honours, Martha Van Coppenolle immersed herself immediately into book and book-cover illustrations, for the famous Flemish writer Ernest Claes from 1941 onwards, with 'De Fanfare', 'De St. Jansvrienden' and 'De Geschiedenis van Black' in 1942. She equally illustrated books and covers for Karel Jonckheere, such as 'Cargo', 'Tierra Caliente' and 'De Zevende Haven' in 1942. Some other famous writers whose books she illustrated were Stijn Streuvels, Guido Gezelle, Valère Depauw, Aster Berkhof, Theo Bogaerts, Jan Boschmans, Jozef Simons, Anton van de Velde, Aimé de Cort, Fritz Reuter, T. Lindekruis and Gaston Duribreux. She always treasured her close friendship with both Ernest Claes and Maurits Bilcke and collaborated on a few occasions with a Czechoslovak designer friend of hers, who worked for M.L. Baugniet and introduced her to him. The result was a unique chromed sofa, which has since been sold. Most of Martha Van Coppenolle's drawings were either executed in pen and ink, pastel or gouache/aquarel. In total she illustrated more than 40 books, for many of which she received honourable mentions during her most prolific years from 1930 to 1955. The 'Letterenhuis - Museum' in Antwerp, has a substantial amount of her original drawings and personal references in their archives. In their quarterly publication 'Zuurvrij 19' of December 2010, a 6-page Flemish article was written by Robert Lucas, about Martha Van Coppenolle (Archive of an Illustrator), emphasizing her extensive past contributions and notability to the literary world of present-day Flanders. Last but not least, she was also responsible for the packaging design of the famous 'Antwerpse Handjes', a typical and special small chocolate, made in the shape of a hand. She also created several Art-Deco design rugs. Unfortunately, the few that still remain are nearly un-obtainable. Most of her works, were either signed in full 'Martha Van Coppenolle','M. Van Coppenolle' or 'M.V.C.'. A few early works were left unsigned.

== Mature work ==
In the 1960s her work became more varied, using artistic media such as plaster and ceramic sculptures, textile designs and hundreds of Neon-Sign advertising panels in pastel-chalks on black board (in order to show fluorescence). She also taught and lectured for many years at the Sint Maria Institute, where she had studied during the 1930s. In the 1950s and 60's she was also an Award-winning member of the SCM Small Film Club in Mortsel, where she produced many 8 and 16 mm. films, for which she received several medals. Her output during her later days included stained-glass windows, which she produced in varying sizes. Most of these were created after an extensive study at The Academy of Fine Arts in Berchem-Antwerp. Her stained glass windows were sold locally, and also in the USA and in Canada.

== Biography ==
In 2007, a complete biography on the Life and Work of Martha Van Coppenolle - Book Illustrator was written in Dutch by Miss Karen Joly, a 3rd degree Bachelor of Arts and Sciences, for the University of Leuven. Several other references concerning Martha Van Coppenolle are to be found on various Internet websites and the World Wide Web.
