= Robert Anker =

Dutch writer

Rengert Robert Anker (26 April 1946 – 20 January 2017) was a Dutch writer. In 1993 he won the Ferdinand Bordewijk Prijs for his novel De terugkeer van kapitein Rob, and in 2002 the Libris Prize for Een soort Engeland.
