= Frida Vogels =

Dutch writer (1930–2026)

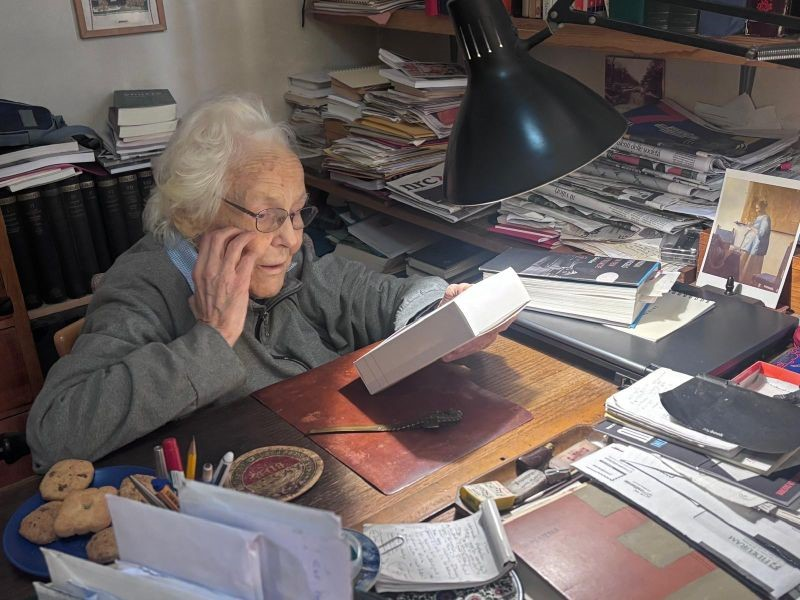
- Vogels, 2026
- Born: 9 January 1930; Soest, Netherlands
- Died: 6 July 2026 (aged 96); Bologna, Italy
- Occupation: Writer

Frida Vogels (9 January 1930 – 6 July 2026) was a Dutch writer, known especially for her partly autobiographical trilogy De harde kern, the second part of which was awarded the inaugural Libris Prize in 1994. Vogels is noted for the close connection between her work and her life, as well as for her low profile: she did not appear at the presentation of the Libris Prize, and there are very few photographs published of her. Vogels was born in Soest, and she lived, worked and died in Bologna, Italy.

== Life and career ==
Vogels' literary career began with De harde kern, on which she had worked for four decades; the first volume was published in 1992. The Libris Prize for the second volume, published 1993, garnered her commercial and critical success; the third volume, a collection of poems, was published in 1994. Since then she has published 11 of the 16 planned volumes of her diaries, and in 2011 a booklet containing diary entries of Aunt Lucietta, an aunt of her husband.

As an editor, Vogels selected texts by Dutch author Bert Weijde (1932–1986) for a posthumously published collection Onder het ijs. She has also inspired other authors: she and Weijde were friends of J. J. Voskuil, and she appears in his Bij nader inzien as Henriëtte Fagel; conversely, Voskuil appears in De harde kern as Jacob.

She also translated from Italian to Dutch, and rendered works by Giacomo Debenedetti, Primo Levi, Cesare Pavese, and Salvatore Satta.

Vogels died on 6 July 2026, at the age of 96.
