= Leo Pleysier =

Belgian writer

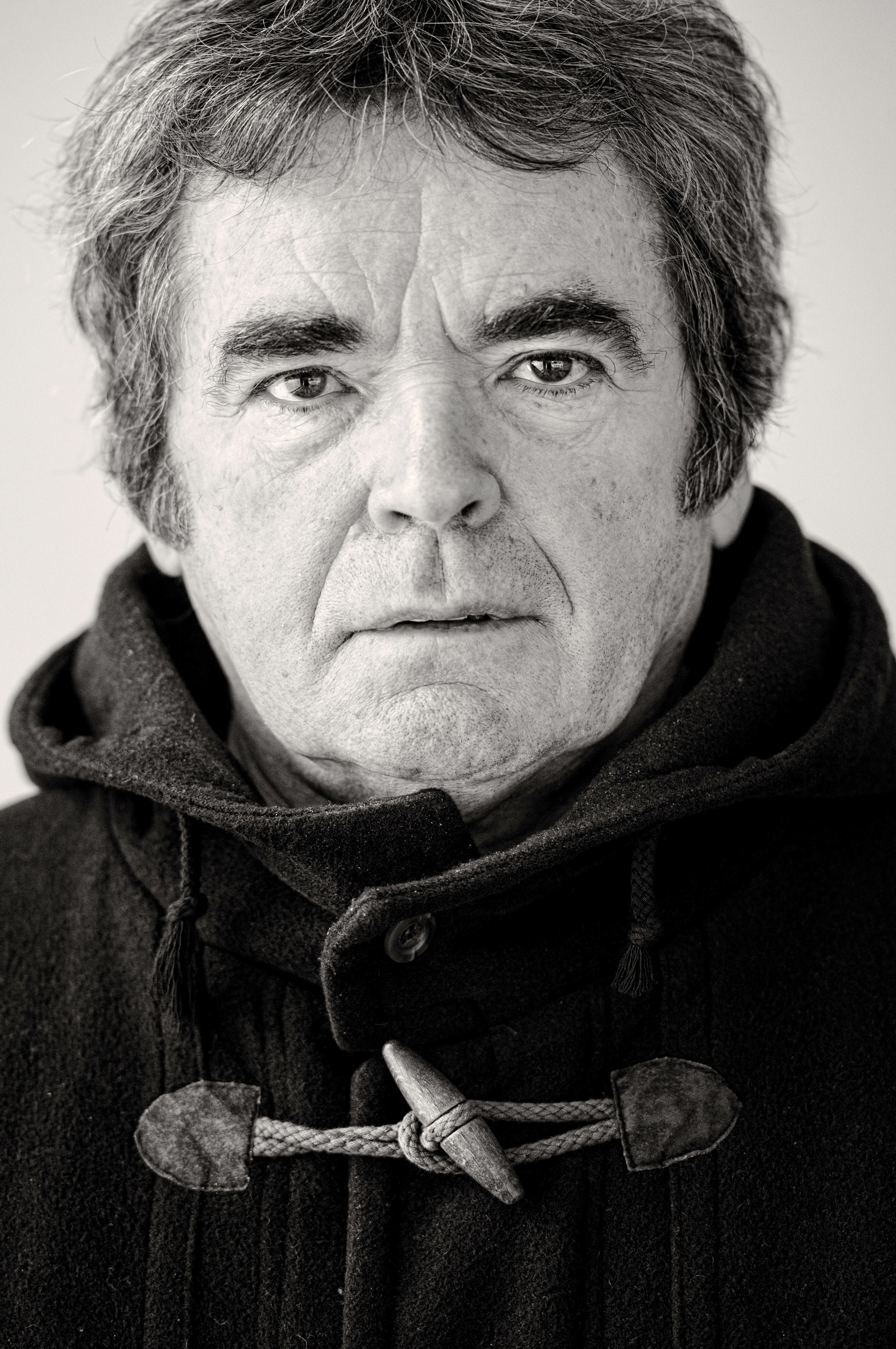
Leo Pleysier (January 2015, photo by Michiel Hendryckx).

Leo Pleysier (b. Rijkevorsel, 28 May 1945) is a Belgian writer.

== Bibliography ==
- Mirliton, een proeve van homofonie (1971)
- Niets dan schreeuw (1972)
- Negenenvijftig (1975)
- Bladschaduwen (1976)
- En wat zullen we over het sterven zeggen? (1976)
- Het jaar van het dorp, of De razernij der winderige dagen (1977)
- Vlaanderen '77 (1977)
- De weg naar Kralingen (1860–1980) (1981)
- Inpakken en wegwezen (1983)
- Kop in kas (1983)
- Shimmy (1987)
- Wit is altijd schoon (1989)
- De kast (1991)
- De Gele Rivier is bevrozen (1993)
- Zwart van het volk (1996)
- Volgend jaar in Berchem (2000)
- De dieven zijn al gaan slapen (2003)
- De trousse (2004)
- De Latino's (2007)
- Dieperik (2010)
- De zoon, de maan en de sterren (2014)
- Familiealbum (2015)
- Heel de tijd (2018)
- Klokgelui (2023)

== Awards ==
- 1984 - Arkprijs van het Vrije Woord for Kop in Kas
- 1990 - Ferdinand Bordewijk Prijs for Wit is altijd schoon
- 1996 - Belgische Staatsprijs voor Proza

== See also ==
- Flemish literature

== Sources ==
- Leo Pleysier
