= Een overtollig mens =

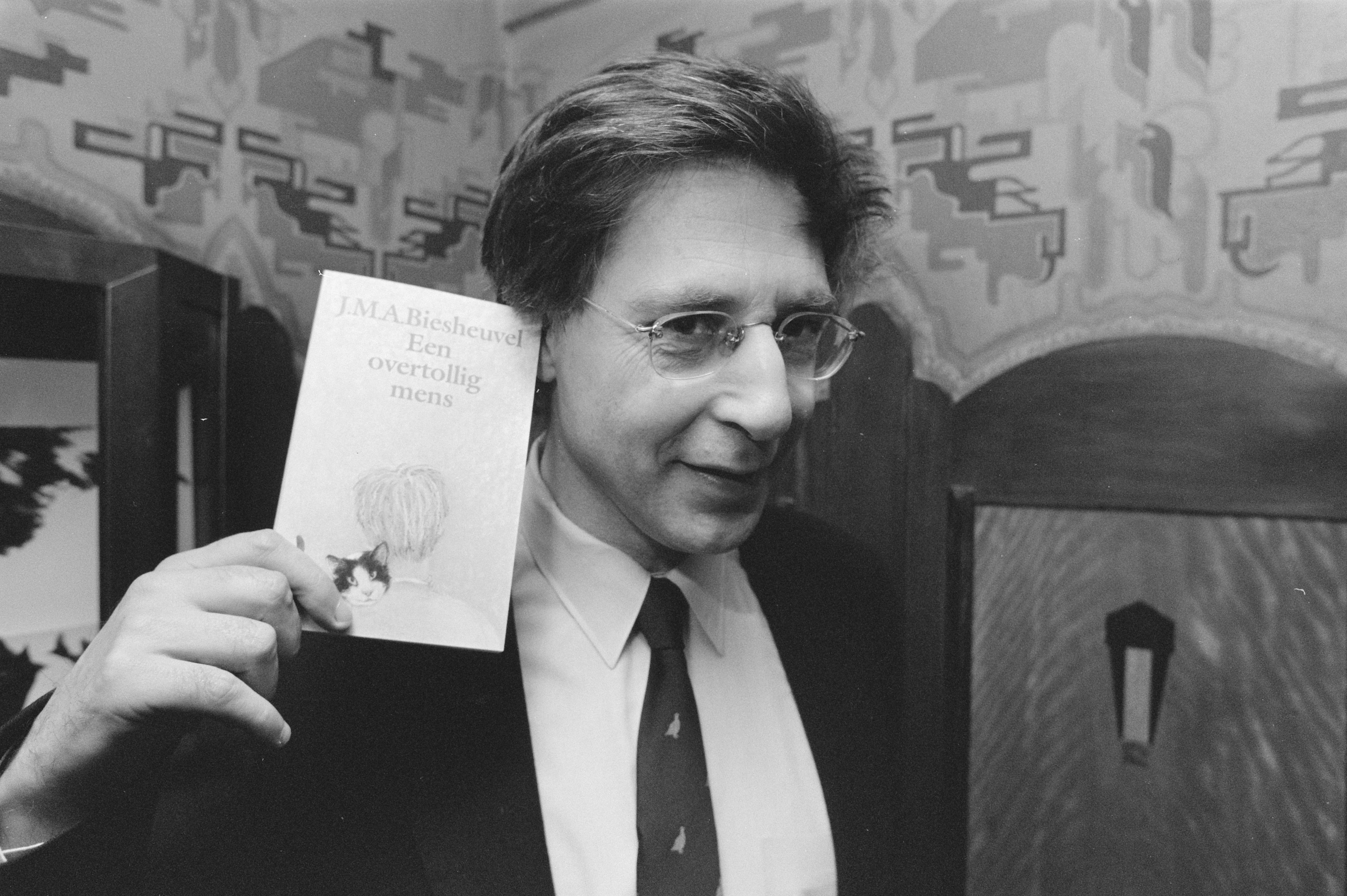
- Biesheuvel with novel
- Author: Maarten Biesheuvel
- Language: Dutch
- Genre: Novel
- Publisher: Stichting CPNB
- Publication date: 1988
- Publication place: Netherlands
- Pages: 94
- ISBN: 9070066661

Een overtollig mens (English: A Superfluous Man) is a Dutch novel written by Maarten Biesheuvel. The book explores themes of existentialism, isolation, and the search for meaning in a modern world.

== See also ==
- Dutch literature
