= Hermine de Graaf =

Dutch novelist

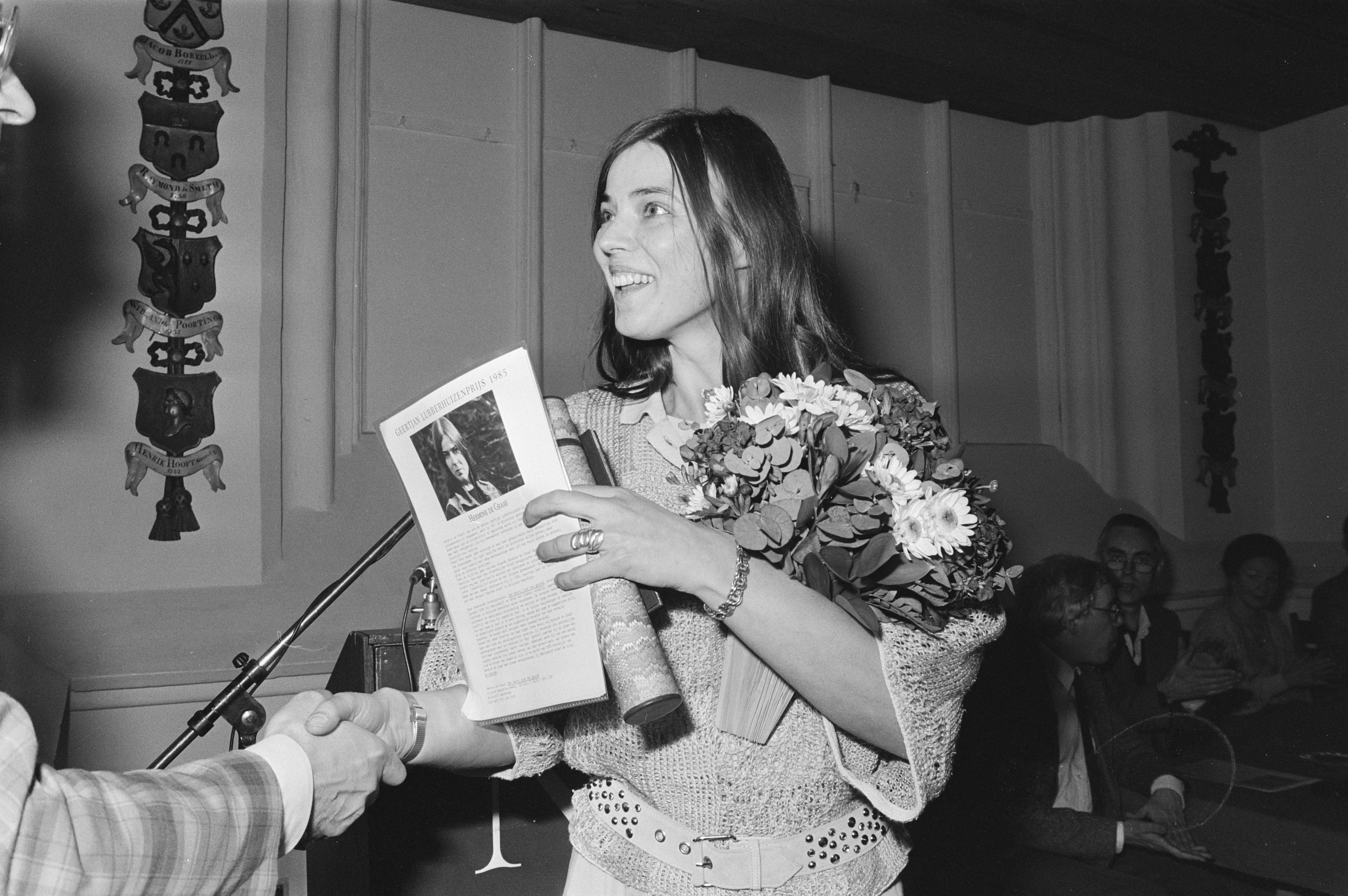
- De Graaf (1985)
- Born: Hermine Jonkers; 13 March 1951; Winschoten
- Died: 24 November 2013 (aged 62); Buinen
- Occupation: writer
- Writing career
- Language: Dutch
- Period: 1984-2013
- Genres: novels, short stories
- Notable awards: Ferdinand Bordewijk Prijs

Hermine de Graaf (13 March 1951 – 24 November 2013) was a Dutch novelist. De Graaf studied Dutch language and literature at the University of Amsterdam and worked as a teacher in Venray. Her debut as a writer was in 1984 with the publication of Een kaart, niet het gebied, a collection of ten short stories. In 1988 De Graaf won the Ferdinand Bordewijk Prijs for her novel De regels van het huis.
