= Gijs IJlander =

Dutch writer (1947–2024)

Gijs Hoetjes (19 May 1947 – 6 February 2024), known by the pseudonym Gijs IJlander, was a Dutch writer. He received the Ferdinand Bordewijk Prijs in 1999 for Twee harten op een schotel.

== Biography ==
Gijs IJlander was born in Alkmaar on 19 May 1947. He studied English and translating in Amsterdam, and debuted in 1988 with the novel De Kapper, for which he was awarded the Geertjan Lubberhuizen Prijs and Anton Wachter Prijs for best debut. The writing of IJlander is quiet and subdued, with strong formulations notice. The themes of his novels are often psychological struggles of his characters. IJlander died on 6 February 2024, at the age of 76.
