= Thomas Rosenboom =

Dutch author

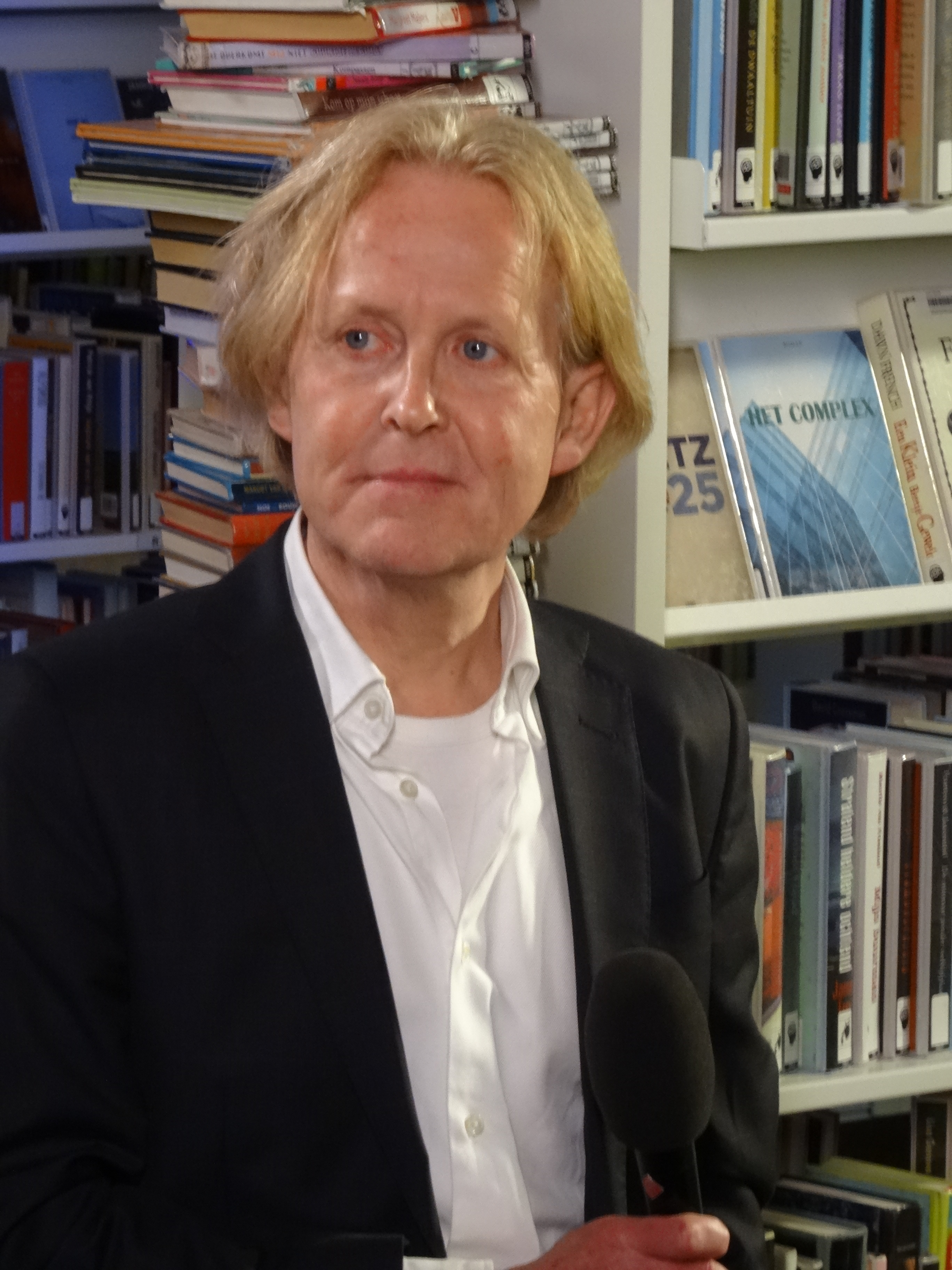
Thomas Rosenboom in 2016.

Thomas Rosenboom (born 8 January 1956 in Doetinchem), is a Dutch author of novels and short stories. His novels Gewassen vlees and Publieke werken won him the Libris Prize in 1995 and 2000; he is the only author to have won it twice.

== Career ==
Rosenboom received his secondary education in Arnhem and then studied psychology in Nijmegen, but after three years switched to Dutch literature and linguistics, gaining his degree cum laude in 1983. His authorial debut was a novella, Bedenkingen, which he published in the literary magazine De Revisor. His 1983 collection De mensen thuis, which included Bedenkingen, won him the Lucy B. en C.W. van der Hoogtprijs. His first novel was the 1985 thriller Vriend van verdienste.

In 2004 Rosenboom wrote the Boekenweekgeschenk, Spitzen. He has taught at the University of Michigan, and has given classes in prose fiction writing in Amsterdam.

== Novels ==
Rosenboom's novels are often historical, containing recognizable, universal characters who are often unable to avoid their fate. His novel Gewassen vlees is set during the eighteenth century, at the time of the Pachtersoproer. His Publieke werken features a pharmacist in Drenthe and his nephew, a violin luthier in Amsterdam, and takes place between 1880 and 1889 against the backdrop of the peat bogs in Drenthe and the late-nineteenth century wealth and expansion of Amsterdam. The novel was contracted for movie adaptation in 2008.

After 2003 he took a break from novel writing and did not publish one until 2009, when Zoete mond appeared, a novel which combines autobiographical elements and historical events. Its publication was notable enough to be mentioned on the national news, the NOS Journaal.

== Bibliography ==
- 1982 – Bedenkingen (novella)
- 1983 – De mensen thuis (stories)
- 1985 – Vriend van verdienste (novel)
- 1994 – Gewassen vlees (novel)
- 1999 – Publieke werken (novel)
- 2003 – De nieuwe man (novel)
- 2004 – Spitzen (novel)
- 2006 – Hoog aan de wind (stories)
- 2009 – Zoete mond (novel)
- 2012 – De rode loper (novel)
