= J. J. Voskuil =

Dutch novelist

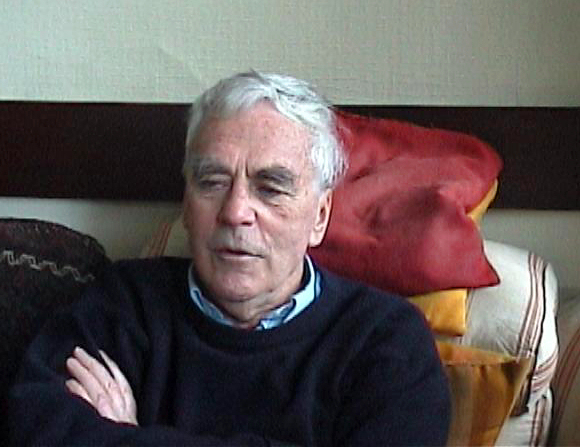
J.J. Voskuil in 2001

Johannes Jacobus Voskuil (1 July 1926, in The Hague – 1 May 2008, in Amsterdam) was a Dutch novelist known best for his epic novel Het Bureau. In 1997 he won the Ferdinand Bordewijk Prijs for his novels Meneer Beerta and Vuile handen, and in 1998 the Libris Prize for Het bureau 3: Plankton.

== Bibliography ==
An extensive scientific bibliography can be found in Doelman, that of literary publications in Heymans (until 1999).

=== Scientific Works ===
- 1956 - The Dutch of Hindustani children in Suriname
- 1969 - Hanging the afterbirth of the horse
- 1978 - Twelve bakers and two bakers' daughters have a conversation with JJ Voskuil
- 1979 - From wickerwork to brick. History of the walls of the farmhouse in the Netherlands
- 1982 - Kohieren of the tenth medal of Overschie 1561 and Twisk 1561

=== Fiction ===
- 1963 - On closer inspection
- 1998 - Word of thanks for the acceptance of the Bordewijk Prize (included in Tirade 373)
- 1999 - Nicolien's mother
- 2000 - Travel Diary 1981
- 2002 - Requiem for a Friend
- 2004 - Casually, hikes 1957-1973
- 2005 - Outside shot, hikes 1974-1982
- 2006 - Gradually, hikes 1983-1992
- 2007 - Journal 1955-1956 (choice from Voskuil's diary, included in Tirade 417)
- 2007 - Among other things, portraits and memories
- 2007 - Bestiary (short sketches)
- 2007 - Alone in the world (short story, included in Tirade 421)
- 2008 - Human Children (stage, recorded in Tirade 424)

==== Posthumous ====
- 2009 - Within the skin
- 2010 - Childhood Memories
- 2012 - The Neighbor (novel)

=== The Office ===
1. 1996 - Mister Beerta
2. 1996 - Dirty Hands - (Ferdinand Bordewijk Prize and Prix des Ambassadeurs)
3. 1997 - Plankton - (Libris Prize and Prix des Ambassadeurs)
4. 1998 - The A.P. Beerta Institute
5. 1999 - And Melancholy, Too
6. 2000 - Failure
7. 2000 - The Death of Maarten Koning
- 2000 - Entrance to The Office

The Office was included in the list of the NRC's Best Dutch novels in 2007.

=== Others ===
- 1963 - When I Grow Up [43] (poem)
- 1995 - Geert van Oorschot, Letters from a publisher (includes three letters to JJ Voskuil, preceded by his memories of Van Oorschot)
- 2005 - Hanny Michaelis, A selection from her poems by JJ Voskuil (anthology, compiled and with an introduction by JJ Voskuil)
- 2012 - Hopefully things will soon go better with God (Four letters to Henk Romijn Meijer, bibliophile edition in 100 copies.)
- 2013 - Henk Romijn Meijer & JJ Voskuil, A trans-Atlantic correspondence (includes correspondence from 1962-1963, delivered by Gerben Wynia )
- 2014 - I am not me . Voskuil's book reviews from the 1950s, preceded by an extensive interview by Detlev van Heest with Voskuil's widow.

== See also ==
- NRC's Best Dutch novels
- Libris Prize
- Ferdinand Bordewijk Prize
