= Jan van Mersbergen =

Dutch novelist

Jan van Mersbergen (born 10 April 1971, Gorinchem) is a Dutch novelist. He has written five novels, including Morgen zijn we in Pamplona (2007) which has been translated into German, French and English. He received in 2011 and 2012 twice €35,000 subsidies for a novel.
