= Tommy Wieringa =

Dutch writer (born 1967)

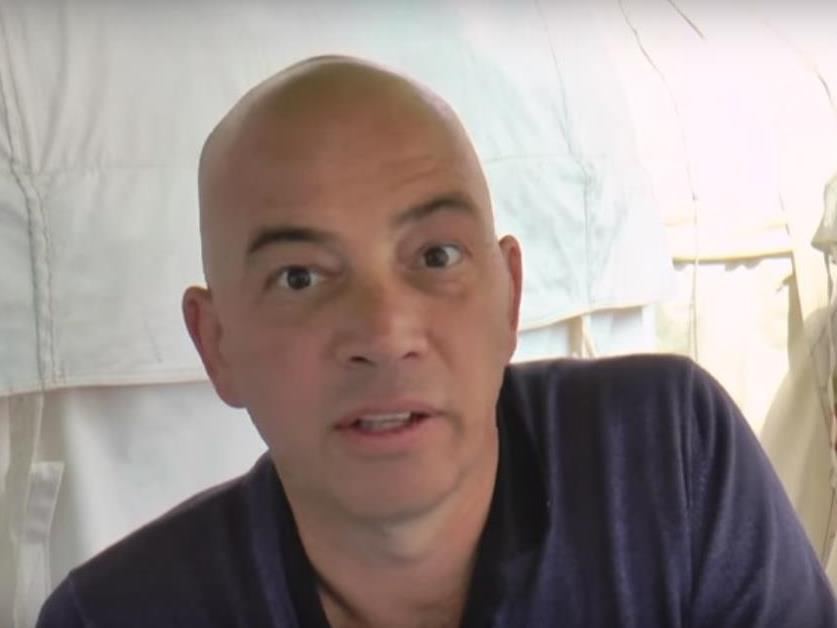
- Born: Tommy Wieringa; 20 May 1967 (age 59); Goor, Netherlands
- Education: University of Groningen; Utrecht University
- Occupation: Writer
- Writing career
- Language: Dutch
- Genre: social novel
- Notable works: Joe Speedboat (2005); Caesarion (2009); Dit zijn de namen (2012)
- Notable awards: F. Bordewijk Prize (2006); Libris Prize (2013); Bookspot Literatuurprijs (2018)

Tommy Wieringa (born 20 May 1967) is a Dutch writer. He received the Ferdinand Bordewijk Prize in 2006 for his novel Joe Speedboot (2005), and the Libris Prize in 2013 for the novel Dit zijn de namen (2012). In 2018 he won the Bookspot Literatuurprijs for his novel De heilige Rita (The Blessed Rita). His novel The Death of Murat Idrissi, translated by Sam Garrett from Dutch, was nominated for the International Booker Prize in 2019.

== Bibliography ==
- 1995 Dormantique's manco
- 1997 Amok
- 2002 Alles over Tristan
- 2005 Joe Speedboot; English translation: Joe Speedboat (2009)
- 2005 Pleidooi voor de potscherf
- 2006 Ik was nooit in Isfahaan
- 2009 Caesarion; English translations: Caesarion (2011), Little Caesar (2012)
- 2010 Alles over Tristan
- 2010 Ga niet naar zee
- 2010 Omdat hij het was, omdat ik het was
- 2012 Dit zijn de namen English translation: These are the Names (2015, Scribe Publishing)
- 2014 Een mooie jonge vrouw English translation: A beautiful Young Wife (2016)
- 2017 De dood van Murat Idrissi English translation: The death of Murat Idrissi (2017)
- 2017 De heilige Rita English translation: The Blessed Rita (2018)
- 2019 Dit is mijn moeder
- 2020 Gedachten over onze tijd (columns)
- 2023 Nirwana (novel)
