= Oek de Jong =

Dutch writer

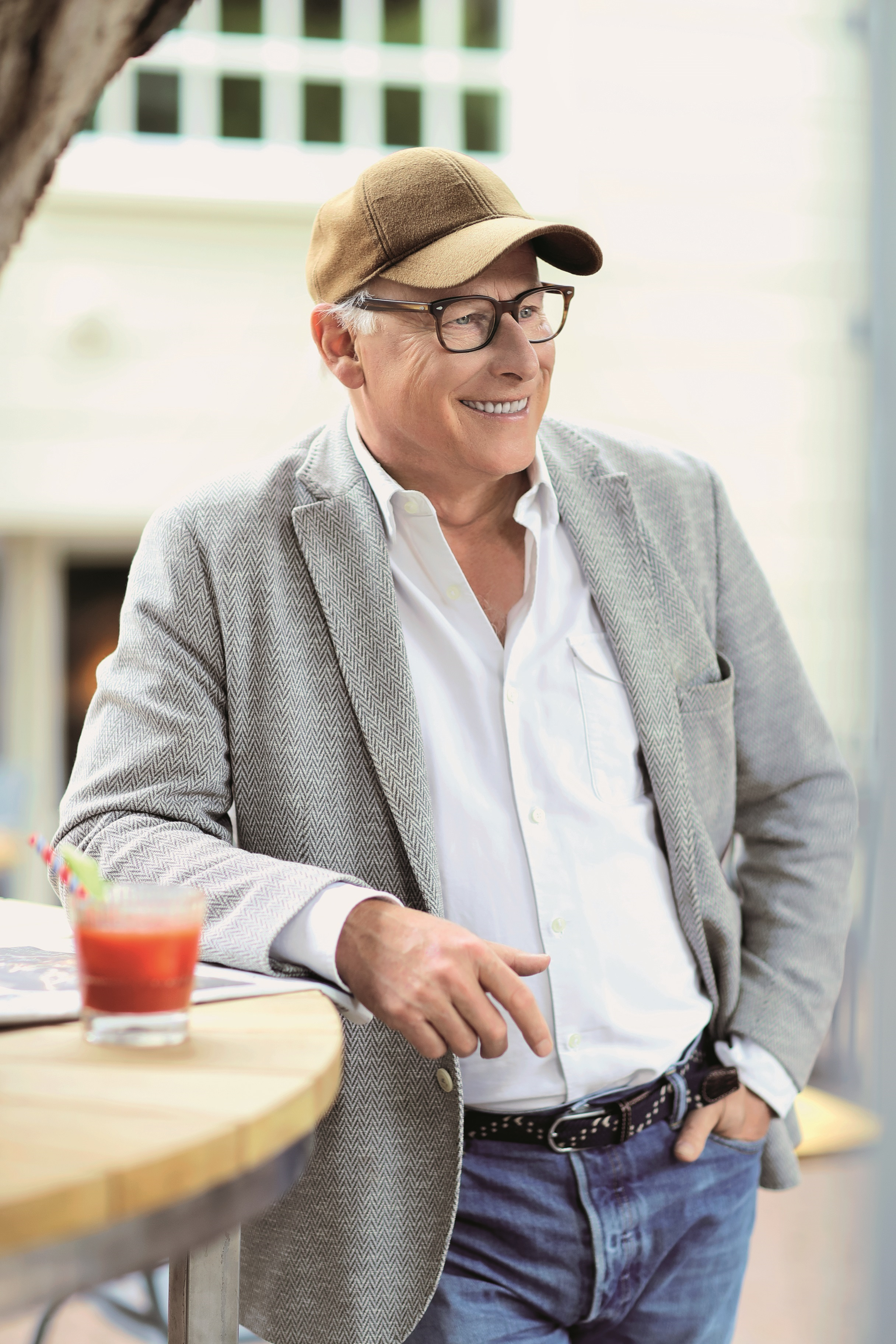
Oek de Jong (2023)

Oebele Klaas Anne (Oek) de Jong (born 4 October 1952 in Breda) is a Dutch novelist.

He debuted in 1976 with De hemelvaart van Massimo, a collection of short stories for which he received the Reina Prinsen Geerligsprijs.

In 1980 he won the Ferdinand Bordewijk Prijs for his novel Opwaaiende zomerjurken.
