= Libris Prize =

Dutch literary award

- Awarded for: Award for Dutch-language novels
- Country: Netherlands, Flanders
- Presented by: Libris booksellers
- Reward: €50,000
- First award: 1994
- Website: http://www.librisliteratuurprijs.nl/

The Libris Literature Award or Libris Prize (Dutch: Libris Literatuur Prijs) is a prize for novels originally written in Dutch. Established in 1993, it is awarded annually since 1994 by Libris, an association of independent Dutch booksellers, and amounts to €50,000 for the winner. It is modeled on the Booker Prize, having a longlist and a selection process which shortlists six books. The author of each shortlisted book receives €2,500.

Shortlisted authors are heavily promoted in individual Libris book stores, providing important commercial opportunities for authors and booksellers. Typically, the (independent) jury's selection is discussed and criticized in the Dutch press, providing even more exposure. The Libris Literature Award with the (Belgian) Golden Owl and the (Dutch) AKO Literatuurprijs make up the "big three" literature awards for Dutch-language books.

== Winners ==
- 1994 – Frida Vogels – De harde kern
- 1995 – Thomas Rosenboom – Gewassen vlees
- 1996 – Alfred Kossmann – Huldigingen
- 1997 – Hugo Claus – ''De geruchten
- 1998 – J.J. Voskuil – Het bureau 3: Plankton
- 1999 – Harry Mulisch – De procedure
- 2000 – Thomas Rosenboom – Publieke Werken
- 2001 – Tomas Lieske – Franklin
- 2002 – Robert Anker – Een soort Engeland
- 2003 – Abdelkader Benali – De langverwachte
- 2004 – Arthur Japin – Een schitterend gebrek
- 2005 – Willem Jan Otten – Specht en zoon
- 2006 – K. Schippers – Waar was je nou
- 2007 – Arnon Grunberg – Tirza
- 2008 – D. Hooijer – Sleur is een roofdier
- 2009 – Dimitri Verhulst – Godverdomse dagen op een godverdomse bol
- 2010 – Bernard Dewulf – Kleine dagen
- 2011 – Yves Petry – De maagd Marino
- 2012 – A.F.Th. van der Heijden – Tonio
- 2013 – Tommy Wieringa – Dit zijn de namen
- 2014 – Ilja Leonard Pfeijffer – La Superba
- 2015 – Adriaan van Dis – Ik kom terug
- 2016 – Connie Palmen – Jij zegt het
- 2017 – Alfred Birney – De tolk van Java
- 2018 – Murat Isik – Wees onzichtbaar
- 2019 – Rob van Essen – De goede zoon
- 2020 – Sander Kollaard – Uit het leven van een hond
- 2021 – Jeroen Brouwers – Cliënt E. Busken
- 2022 – Mariken Heitman – Wormmaan
- 2023 – Anjet Daanje – Het lied van ooieveaar en dromedaris

== See also ==
- Libris History Prize
