= Bougainville (novel) =

1981 novel by F. Springer

Bougainville: Een gedenkschrift
- Author: F. Springer
- Language: Dutch
- Genre: Novel
- Publisher: Querido
- Publication date: 1981
- Publication place: Netherlands
- Media type: Print
- Pages: 128
- Preceded by: Zaken overzee (1977)
- Followed by: Quissama (1985)

Bougainville: Een gedenkschrift is a novel by Dutch author F. Springer. Published in 1981, it won the Ferdinand Bordewijk Prijs in 1982. The novel is one of the author's most popular and was Springer's first big literary success. It is set in the nineteenth-century Dutch colonial past and contemporaneous Bangladesh, and is based on the experiences of the author, who grew up in the Dutch East Indies (present-day Indonesia) and was stationed in Bangladesh as a diplomat.

== Plot ==
The narrator, Bo, is a middle-aged diplomat somewhat disenchanted with his life, who finds himself, stationed in Bangladesh in 1973, reconstructing the life of his childhood friend Tommie. After they got reacquainted at a class reunion, Tommie drowned himself in the Bay of Bengal and left Bo with a collection of papers which, beside autobiographical material by Bo, also contains the memoirs of his grandfather, a frustrated idealist who left by boat for the Dutch Indies in the early 1900s, and managed to bed Mata Hari on the way. The novel combines the three plotlines of Bo's account of his friendship with Tommie and his work in Bangladesh, which he perceives as futile; Tommie's account, a success story which ends in suicide; and the reflections of Tommie's grandfather.

== Themes and interpretation ==
The novel relies heavily on the concept of tempo doeloe, a kind of nostalgia associated with the former Dutch colonies in the Far East and often expressed in the work of Dutch authors who have roots in Indonesia. Springer is one such writer. He was born in Batavia, the city founded in 1619 and the most important base of the Dutch colonial empire governed by the Dutch East India Company; this nostalgia is most clearly expressed by the grandfather of the narrator's childhood friend.

== Critical reception ==
Bougainville was well received by Dutch readers as well as reviewers, such as well-known Dutch critic Ton van Deel, who proclaimed himself a Springer fan on the occasion of the publication of his collected works. Van Deel sees in Bougainville the transition from Springer's earlier sensitive and witty work to a deeper, more serious engagement with his own writing. In 1982, the novel was awarded the Ferdinand Bordewijk Prijs.

== Editions and translations ==
By 2001, the novel had been reprinted fifteen times in the Netherlands. In 1985, it was published as a Salamander pocket, an affordable paperback version for the mass market, and newly printed (with new cover designs) in the same series in 1988 and 1993. In 1998, Bougainville, Springer's follow-up novel Quissama (1985), and Bandoeng-Bandung (1993) were published by Querido as Weemoed en verlangen (Nostalgia and Desire). In 2004, Bougainville and Quissama were published in one volume by Querido under the title Verre Paradijzen ("Remote Paradises"); Pieter Steinz, writing in NRC Handelsblad, ranked that book first on his list of summer books for 2004.

The novel was translated in French and German.
