= List of minor planets: 679001–680000 =

The following is a partial list of minor planets, running from minor-planet number 679001 through 680000, inclusive. The primary data for this and other partial lists is based on JPL's "Small-Body Orbital Elements" and data available from the Minor Planet Center. Critical list information is also provided by the MPC, unless otherwise specified from Lowell Observatory. A detailed description of the table's columns and additional sources are given on the main page including a complete list of every page in this series, and a statistical break-up on the dynamical classification of minor planets.

Also see the summary list of all named bodies in numerical and alphabetical order, and the corresponding naming citations for the number range of this particular list. New namings may only be added to this list after official publication, as the preannouncement of names is condemned by the Working Group for Small Bodies Nomenclature of the International Astronomical Union.

Near-Earth obj.	MBA (inner)	MBA (outer)	Centaur
Mars-crosser	MBA (middle)	Jupiter trojan	Trans-Neptunian obj.
Unclassified

== 679001–679100 ==
Designation			Discovery			Properties		Ref
Permanent	Provisional	Named after	Date	Site	Discoverer(s)	Category	Diam.	Ref
679001	2018 JG_{6}	—	January 30, 2011	Mount Lemmon	Mount Lemmon Survey	·	990 m	MPC · JPL
679002	2018 JE_{9}	—	May 12, 2018	Cerro Paranal	Altmann, M., Prusti, T.	·	550 m	MPC · JPL
679003	2018 JH_{9}	—	May 13, 2018	Mount Lemmon	Mount Lemmon Survey	EUN	710 m	MPC · JPL
679004	2018 KF_{2}	—	July 9, 2016	Mount Lemmon	Mount Lemmon Survey	·	340 m	MPC · JPL
679005	2018 KM_{3}	—	August 9, 2015	Haleakala	Pan-STARRS 1	(2076)	710 m	MPC · JPL
679006	2018 KK_{4}	—	May 21, 2018	Haleakala	Pan-STARRS 1	·	850 m	MPC · JPL
679007	2018 LD	—	September 19, 2014	Haleakala	Pan-STARRS 1	·	1.8 km	MPC · JPL
679008	2018 LX_{1}	—	June 11, 2015	Haleakala	Pan-STARRS 1	·	600 m	MPC · JPL
679009	2018 LG_{3}	—	October 7, 2016	Haleakala	Pan-STARRS 1	H	390 m	MPC · JPL
679010	2018 LP_{4}	—	November 1, 2015	Haleakala	Pan-STARRS 1	·	950 m	MPC · JPL
679011	2018 LN_{8}	—	September 21, 2008	Kitt Peak	Spacewatch	·	2.4 km	MPC · JPL
679012	2018 LR_{8}	—	September 6, 2010	Mount Lemmon	Mount Lemmon Survey	·	1.8 km	MPC · JPL
679013	2018 LW_{15}	—	June 14, 2018	Haleakala	Pan-STARRS 1	·	1.2 km	MPC · JPL
679014	2018 LH_{19}	—	February 27, 2012	Haleakala	Pan-STARRS 1	EUN	1.5 km	MPC · JPL
679015	2018 LR_{23}	—	June 15, 2018	Haleakala	Pan-STARRS 1	·	1.9 km	MPC · JPL
679016	2018 LQ_{24}	—	June 12, 2018	Haleakala	Pan-STARRS 1	L4	7.6 km	MPC · JPL
679017	2018 LP_{26}	—	June 6, 2018	Haleakala	Pan-STARRS 1	·	520 m	MPC · JPL
679018	2018 MD_{6}	—	January 24, 2010	Siding Spring	SSS	H	500 m	MPC · JPL
679019	2018 MJ_{6}	—	October 8, 2008	Kitt Peak	Spacewatch	·	3.6 km	MPC · JPL
679020	2018 MP_{6}	—	November 6, 2015	Haleakala	Pan-STARRS 1	·	650 m	MPC · JPL
679021	2018 MC_{8}	—	June 17, 2018	Haleakala	Pan-STARRS 2	·	970 m	MPC · JPL
679022	2018 MU_{11}	—	June 18, 2018	Haleakala	Pan-STARRS 1	·	1.0 km	MPC · JPL
679023	2018 MX_{15}	—	June 24, 2018	Haleakala	Pan-STARRS 1	·	1.4 km	MPC · JPL
679024	2018 MT_{20}	—	June 18, 2018	Haleakala	Pan-STARRS 1	L4	6.6 km	MPC · JPL
679025	2018 MD_{21}	—	June 23, 2018	Haleakala	Pan-STARRS 1	·	470 m	MPC · JPL
679026	2018 MT_{23}	—	June 18, 2018	Haleakala	Pan-STARRS 1	L4	7.4 km	MPC · JPL
679027	2018 ND_{3}	—	September 8, 2015	XuYi	PMO NEO Survey Program	·	910 m	MPC · JPL
679028	2018 NO_{13}	—	August 19, 2001	Socorro	LINEAR	·	2.9 km	MPC · JPL
679029	2018 NA_{14}	—	June 16, 2018	Haleakala	Pan-STARRS 1	PHO	830 m	MPC · JPL
679030	2018 NU_{15}	—	July 10, 2018	Haleakala	Pan-STARRS 1	L4	7.0 km	MPC · JPL
679031	2018 NZ_{16}	—	August 29, 2014	Mount Lemmon	Mount Lemmon Survey	·	1.0 km	MPC · JPL
679032	2018 NQ_{22}	—	June 15, 2018	Haleakala	Pan-STARRS 1	·	1.2 km	MPC · JPL
679033	2018 NX_{23}	—	July 10, 2018	Haleakala	Pan-STARRS 1	·	910 m	MPC · JPL
679034	2018 NG_{26}	—	November 3, 2007	Mount Lemmon	Mount Lemmon Survey	·	910 m	MPC · JPL
679035	2018 OP	—	July 27, 2014	Haleakala	Pan-STARRS 1	·	990 m	MPC · JPL
679036	2018 PX_{4}	—	April 9, 2014	Catalina	CSS	PHO	700 m	MPC · JPL
679037	2018 PH_{10}	—	September 29, 2008	Mount Lemmon	Mount Lemmon Survey	·	630 m	MPC · JPL
679038	2018 PC_{11}	—	February 9, 2014	Mount Lemmon	Mount Lemmon Survey	·	600 m	MPC · JPL
679039	2018 PH_{11}	—	June 4, 2011	Mount Lemmon	Mount Lemmon Survey	·	620 m	MPC · JPL
679040	2018 PR_{16}	—	August 27, 2011	Haleakala	Pan-STARRS 1	NYS	570 m	MPC · JPL
679041	2018 PM_{17}	—	September 4, 2011	Haleakala	Pan-STARRS 1	·	940 m	MPC · JPL
679042	2018 PS_{19}	—	March 12, 2014	Mount Lemmon	Mount Lemmon Survey	·	600 m	MPC · JPL
679043	2018 PZ_{31}	—	June 3, 2014	Haleakala	Pan-STARRS 1	·	1.4 km	MPC · JPL
679044	2018 PM_{32}	—	August 11, 2018	Haleakala	Pan-STARRS 1	·	1.2 km	MPC · JPL
679045	2018 PA_{45}	—	August 11, 2018	Haleakala	Pan-STARRS 1	·	1.2 km	MPC · JPL
679046	2018 PT_{50}	—	August 5, 2018	Haleakala	Pan-STARRS 1	PHO	680 m	MPC · JPL
679047	2018 PE_{67}	—	January 3, 2009	Mount Lemmon	Mount Lemmon Survey	·	960 m	MPC · JPL
679048	2018 PS_{68}	—	August 6, 2018	Haleakala	Pan-STARRS 1	·	800 m	MPC · JPL
679049	2018 PP_{73}	—	October 28, 2010	Mount Lemmon	Mount Lemmon Survey	·	1.2 km	MPC · JPL
679050	2018 PM_{75}	—	August 5, 2018	Haleakala	Pan-STARRS 1	L4	4.5 km	MPC · JPL
679051	2018 PR_{92}	—	September 12, 2009	Catalina	CSS	(1547)	1.1 km	MPC · JPL
679052	2018 QQ_{2}	—	September 23, 2000	Socorro	LINEAR	·	1.5 km	MPC · JPL
679053	2018 QF_{8}	—	October 27, 2011	Mount Lemmon	Mount Lemmon Survey	·	980 m	MPC · JPL
679054	2018 QQ_{15}	—	August 19, 2018	Haleakala	Pan-STARRS 1	·	930 m	MPC · JPL
679055	2018 QF_{19}	—	January 26, 2015	Haleakala	Pan-STARRS 1	·	1.5 km	MPC · JPL
679056	2018 RO_{3}	—	December 24, 2016	Haleakala	Pan-STARRS 1	·	350 m	MPC · JPL
679057	2018 RS_{8}	—	November 21, 2014	Haleakala	Pan-STARRS 1	·	1.6 km	MPC · JPL
679058	2018 RJ_{9}	—	November 7, 2010	Catalina	CSS	·	930 m	MPC · JPL
679059	2018 RZ_{10}	—	January 18, 2016	Haleakala	Pan-STARRS 1	·	1.0 km	MPC · JPL
679060	2018 RZ_{12}	—	March 10, 2016	Haleakala	Pan-STARRS 1	(1547)	1.2 km	MPC · JPL
679061	2018 RK_{15}	—	December 13, 2010	Catalina	CSS	·	1.5 km	MPC · JPL
679062	2018 RB_{17}	—	November 25, 2014	Mount Lemmon	Mount Lemmon Survey	ADE	1.8 km	MPC · JPL
679063	2018 RP_{17}	—	May 12, 2004	Siding Spring	SSS	·	760 m	MPC · JPL
679064	2018 RV_{17}	—	June 28, 2001	Kitt Peak	Spacewatch	HYG	3.0 km	MPC · JPL
679065	2018 RA_{20}	—	July 10, 2018	Haleakala	Pan-STARRS 1	V	440 m	MPC · JPL
679066	2018 RH_{20}	—	September 12, 2007	Anderson Mesa	LONEOS	·	3.3 km	MPC · JPL
679067	2018 RK_{21}	—	September 23, 2008	Mount Lemmon	Mount Lemmon Survey	·	600 m	MPC · JPL
679068	2018 RL_{23}	—	December 21, 2015	Mount Lemmon	Mount Lemmon Survey	·	1.3 km	MPC · JPL
679069	2018 RF_{24}	—	April 4, 2016	Mount Lemmon	Mount Lemmon Survey	·	1.5 km	MPC · JPL
679070	2018 RQ_{24}	—	March 25, 2014	Mount Lemmon	Mount Lemmon Survey	·	790 m	MPC · JPL
679071	2018 RE_{31}	—	July 29, 2014	Haleakala	Pan-STARRS 1	EUN	960 m	MPC · JPL
679072	2018 RX_{32}	—	September 2, 2000	Kitt Peak	Spacewatch	V	650 m	MPC · JPL
679073	2018 RC_{33}	—	March 5, 2008	Mount Lemmon	Mount Lemmon Survey	EUN	1.2 km	MPC · JPL
679074	2018 RE_{35}	—	September 3, 2014	Catalina	CSS	·	1.3 km	MPC · JPL
679075	2018 RG_{35}	—	August 4, 2011	Haleakala	Pan-STARRS 1	·	650 m	MPC · JPL
679076	2018 RH_{36}	—	October 1, 2014	Haleakala	Pan-STARRS 1	·	980 m	MPC · JPL
679077	2018 RV_{37}	—	March 28, 2016	Cerro Tololo-DECam	DECam	(1547)	1.2 km	MPC · JPL
679078	2018 RH_{38}	—	November 27, 2014	Mount Lemmon	Mount Lemmon Survey	·	850 m	MPC · JPL
679079	2018 RT_{38}	—	September 9, 2018	Mount Lemmon	Mount Lemmon Survey	·	990 m	MPC · JPL
679080	2018 RX_{38}	—	September 8, 2018	Mount Lemmon	Mount Lemmon Survey	·	1.3 km	MPC · JPL
679081	2018 RP_{39}	—	September 9, 2018	Mount Lemmon	Mount Lemmon Survey	·	1.0 km	MPC · JPL
679082	2018 RR_{39}	—	September 8, 2018	Mount Lemmon	Mount Lemmon Survey	·	1.5 km	MPC · JPL
679083	2018 RC_{44}	—	September 13, 2018	Mount Lemmon	Mount Lemmon Survey	·	970 m	MPC · JPL
679084	2018 RS_{46}	—	September 8, 2018	Mount Lemmon	Mount Lemmon Survey	·	940 m	MPC · JPL
679085	2018 RV_{46}	—	September 10, 2018	Mount Lemmon	Mount Lemmon Survey	(5)	840 m	MPC · JPL
679086	2018 RX_{48}	—	September 8, 2018	Mount Lemmon	Mount Lemmon Survey	·	1.2 km	MPC · JPL
679087	2018 RZ_{48}	—	September 13, 2018	Mount Lemmon	Mount Lemmon Survey	·	900 m	MPC · JPL
679088	2018 RS_{50}	—	September 9, 2018	Mount Lemmon	Mount Lemmon Survey	·	1.3 km	MPC · JPL
679089	2018 RR_{51}	—	September 11, 2018	Mount Lemmon	Mount Lemmon Survey	·	1.4 km	MPC · JPL
679090	2018 RN_{52}	—	January 14, 2011	Kitt Peak	Spacewatch	·	1.2 km	MPC · JPL
679091	2018 RO_{52}	—	March 28, 2016	Cerro Tololo-DECam	DECam	EUN	890 m	MPC · JPL
679092	2018 RM_{58}	—	September 13, 2018	Mount Lemmon	Mount Lemmon Survey	EUN	1.1 km	MPC · JPL
679093	2018 RO_{61}	—	May 3, 2008	Mount Lemmon	Mount Lemmon Survey	·	460 m	MPC · JPL
679094	2018 RJ_{63}	—	October 28, 2014	Haleakala	Pan-STARRS 1	·	1.0 km	MPC · JPL
679095	2018 SX_{3}	—	August 31, 2018	Palomar	Zwicky Transient Facility	·	1.4 km	MPC · JPL
679096	2018 SW_{5}	—	October 28, 2014	Catalina	CSS	·	1.3 km	MPC · JPL
679097	2018 SM_{6}	—	May 8, 2014	Haleakala	Pan-STARRS 1	·	960 m	MPC · JPL
679098	2018 SW_{6}	—	July 2, 2014	Haleakala	Pan-STARRS 1	PHO	810 m	MPC · JPL
679099	2018 SB_{8}	—	July 19, 2001	Palomar	NEAT	·	590 m	MPC · JPL
679100	2018 SF_{8}	—	November 26, 2006	7300	W. K. Y. Yeung	EUN	800 m	MPC · JPL

== 679101–679200 ==
back to top

Designation			Discovery			Properties		Ref
Permanent	Provisional	Named after	Date	Site	Discoverer(s)	Category	Diam.	Ref
679101	2018 SA_{11}	—	October 29, 2003	Kitt Peak	Spacewatch	PHO	940 m	MPC · JPL
679102	2018 SQ_{11}	—	August 30, 2014	Haleakala	Pan-STARRS 1	·	1.1 km	MPC · JPL
679103	2018 SW_{11}	—	September 13, 2007	Mount Lemmon	Mount Lemmon Survey	NYS	940 m	MPC · JPL
679104	2018 SM_{12}	—	October 8, 2014	Haleakala	Pan-STARRS 1	·	1.7 km	MPC · JPL
679105	2018 SO_{12}	—	December 8, 2010	Mount Lemmon	Mount Lemmon Survey	·	1.4 km	MPC · JPL
679106	2018 SE_{13}	—	October 19, 2007	Mount Lemmon	Mount Lemmon Survey	·	2.5 km	MPC · JPL
679107	2018 SR_{14}	—	February 3, 2006	Catalina	CSS	H	580 m	MPC · JPL
679108	2018 SY_{14}	—	December 14, 2010	Mount Lemmon	Mount Lemmon Survey	·	950 m	MPC · JPL
679109	2018 SD_{15}	—	January 23, 2006	Kitt Peak	Spacewatch	·	740 m	MPC · JPL
679110	2018 SU_{20}	—	March 30, 2016	Cerro Tololo-DECam	DECam	MAR	940 m	MPC · JPL
679111	2018 TL_{4}	—	January 3, 2017	Haleakala	Pan-STARRS 1	H	320 m	MPC · JPL
679112	2018 TE_{9}	—	January 26, 2011	Catalina	CSS	·	1.4 km	MPC · JPL
679113	2018 TB_{10}	—	October 2, 2014	Haleakala	Pan-STARRS 1	(5)	710 m	MPC · JPL
679114	2018 TU_{11}	—	August 19, 2014	Haleakala	Pan-STARRS 1	V	510 m	MPC · JPL
679115	2018 TX_{11}	—	January 12, 2011	Mount Lemmon	Mount Lemmon Survey	·	1.1 km	MPC · JPL
679116	2018 TA_{12}	—	October 22, 2006	Catalina	CSS	·	1.1 km	MPC · JPL
679117	2018 TD_{12}	—	February 5, 2016	Haleakala	Pan-STARRS 1	·	1.1 km	MPC · JPL
679118	2018 TH_{12}	—	October 25, 2014	Mount Lemmon	Mount Lemmon Survey	·	1.1 km	MPC · JPL
679119	2018 TL_{12}	—	September 2, 2008	La Sagra	OAM	·	670 m	MPC · JPL
679120	2018 TA_{14}	—	July 29, 2011	Siding Spring	SSS	·	560 m	MPC · JPL
679121	2018 TV_{14}	—	November 1, 2010	Zelenchukskaya Stn	T. V. Krjačko, Satovski, B.	EUN	1.1 km	MPC · JPL
679122	2018 TH_{15}	—	October 4, 2018	Haleakala	Pan-STARRS 2	·	1.1 km	MPC · JPL
679123	2018 TM_{15}	—	May 1, 2016	Cerro Tololo-DECam	DECam	·	1.1 km	MPC · JPL
679124	2018 TS_{15}	—	December 11, 2014	Mount Lemmon	Mount Lemmon Survey	·	790 m	MPC · JPL
679125	2018 TG_{18}	—	October 6, 2018	Kitt Peak	Spacewatch	ADE	1.4 km	MPC · JPL
679126	2018 TS_{26}	—	October 5, 2018	Mount Lemmon	Mount Lemmon Survey	·	790 m	MPC · JPL
679127	2018 TP_{44}	—	March 28, 2016	Cerro Tololo-DECam	DECam	ADE	1.7 km	MPC · JPL
679128	2018 UV_{3}	—	March 31, 2016	Haleakala	Pan-STARRS 1	·	1.1 km	MPC · JPL
679129	2018 UD_{4}	—	January 19, 2016	Haleakala	Pan-STARRS 1	·	1.2 km	MPC · JPL
679130	2018 UU_{4}	—	January 14, 2011	Kitt Peak	Spacewatch	·	990 m	MPC · JPL
679131	2018 UA_{5}	—	September 9, 2018	Mount Lemmon	Mount Lemmon Survey	·	740 m	MPC · JPL
679132	2018 UR_{5}	—	February 21, 2006	Mount Lemmon	Mount Lemmon Survey	V	750 m	MPC · JPL
679133	2018 UD_{6}	—	October 29, 2014	Catalina	CSS	·	1.1 km	MPC · JPL
679134	2018 UJ_{6}	—	October 20, 2003	Kitt Peak	Spacewatch	MAS	790 m	MPC · JPL
679135	2018 UF_{7}	—	August 31, 2014	Haleakala	Pan-STARRS 1	BRG	980 m	MPC · JPL
679136	2018 UH_{7}	—	September 20, 2011	Kitt Peak	Spacewatch	·	1.0 km	MPC · JPL
679137	2018 UA_{11}	—	December 3, 2010	Mount Lemmon	Mount Lemmon Survey	·	810 m	MPC · JPL
679138	2018 UH_{12}	—	November 30, 2014	Haleakala	Pan-STARRS 1	·	900 m	MPC · JPL
679139	2018 UN_{12}	—	November 10, 2005	Catalina	CSS	ADE	1.6 km	MPC · JPL
679140	2018 UW_{12}	—	November 29, 2014	Haleakala	Pan-STARRS 1	(116763)	1.6 km	MPC · JPL
679141	2018 UY_{12}	—	December 16, 2015	Mount Lemmon	Mount Lemmon Survey	·	470 m	MPC · JPL
679142	2018 UB_{13}	—	October 16, 2001	Palomar	NEAT	·	750 m	MPC · JPL
679143	2018 UC_{15}	—	October 14, 2009	Mount Lemmon	Mount Lemmon Survey	·	1.5 km	MPC · JPL
679144	2018 UQ_{16}	—	May 4, 2006	Kitt Peak	Spacewatch	·	1.2 km	MPC · JPL
679145	2018 UH_{17}	—	November 26, 2014	Haleakala	Pan-STARRS 1	EUN	1.0 km	MPC · JPL
679146	2018 UT_{17}	—	December 25, 2005	Kitt Peak	Spacewatch	JUN	860 m	MPC · JPL
679147	2018 UT_{18}	—	March 13, 2012	Mount Lemmon	Mount Lemmon Survey	EUN	1.0 km	MPC · JPL
679148	2018 UB_{19}	—	October 10, 2018	Mount Lemmon	Mount Lemmon Survey	·	1.3 km	MPC · JPL
679149	2018 UK_{19}	—	December 10, 2014	Mount Lemmon	Mount Lemmon Survey	·	1.2 km	MPC · JPL
679150	2018 UQ_{19}	—	October 22, 2018	Haleakala	Pan-STARRS 2	·	1.6 km	MPC · JPL
679151	2018 UA_{21}	—	August 16, 2009	Catalina	CSS	·	1.3 km	MPC · JPL
679152	2018 UB_{21}	—	October 20, 2018	Mount Lemmon	Mount Lemmon Survey	KRM	1.8 km	MPC · JPL
679153	2018 UK_{23}	—	October 17, 2018	Haleakala	Pan-STARRS 2	·	930 m	MPC · JPL
679154	2018 UU_{23}	—	October 10, 2018	Mount Lemmon	Mount Lemmon Survey	MAR	810 m	MPC · JPL
679155	2018 UL_{24}	—	October 18, 2018	Mount Lemmon	Mount Lemmon Survey	EUN	830 m	MPC · JPL
679156	2018 UX_{24}	—	March 28, 2016	Cerro Tololo-DECam	DECam	EUN	860 m	MPC · JPL
679157	2018 US_{26}	—	October 16, 2018	Haleakala	Pan-STARRS 2	·	1.8 km	MPC · JPL
679158	2018 UR_{27}	—	March 29, 2016	Cerro Tololo-DECam	DECam	HNS	670 m	MPC · JPL
679159	2018 UY_{28}	—	April 3, 2016	Haleakala	Pan-STARRS 1	MAR	780 m	MPC · JPL
679160	2018 UX_{33}	—	October 17, 2018	Haleakala	Pan-STARRS 2	·	1.8 km	MPC · JPL
679161	2018 UP_{38}	—	March 18, 2016	Mount Lemmon	Mount Lemmon Survey	EUN	850 m	MPC · JPL
679162	2018 UE_{39}	—	October 18, 2018	Haleakala	Pan-STARRS 2	·	1.3 km	MPC · JPL
679163	2018 VO_{4}	—	October 30, 2005	Catalina	CSS	BAR	1.0 km	MPC · JPL
679164	2018 VG_{8}	—	December 18, 2009	Kitt Peak	Spacewatch	AMO	560 m	MPC · JPL
679165	2018 VW_{13}	—	May 1, 2016	Cerro Tololo-DECam	DECam	·	840 m	MPC · JPL
679166	2018 VY_{13}	—	October 31, 2010	Mount Lemmon	Mount Lemmon Survey	(10369)	2.0 km	MPC · JPL
679167	2018 VU_{14}	—	November 24, 2014	Kitt Peak	Spacewatch	·	1.0 km	MPC · JPL
679168	2018 VE_{15}	—	May 26, 2011	Mount Lemmon	Mount Lemmon Survey	·	520 m	MPC · JPL
679169	2018 VR_{15}	—	July 27, 2011	Haleakala	Pan-STARRS 1	·	660 m	MPC · JPL
679170	2018 VH_{16}	—	October 28, 2014	Haleakala	Pan-STARRS 1	·	2.3 km	MPC · JPL
679171	2018 VQ_{17}	—	January 31, 2006	Kitt Peak	Spacewatch	·	930 m	MPC · JPL
679172	2018 VX_{18}	—	November 18, 2006	Mount Lemmon	Mount Lemmon Survey	·	1.5 km	MPC · JPL
679173	2018 VB_{19}	—	January 21, 2015	Kitt Peak	Spacewatch	·	1.2 km	MPC · JPL
679174	2018 VG_{19}	—	February 11, 2016	Haleakala	Pan-STARRS 1	·	1.1 km	MPC · JPL
679175	2018 VE_{23}	—	October 7, 2014	Haleakala	Pan-STARRS 1	·	1.3 km	MPC · JPL
679176	2018 VE_{25}	—	January 26, 2011	Mount Lemmon	Mount Lemmon Survey	ADE	1.3 km	MPC · JPL
679177	2018 VK_{26}	—	August 29, 2014	Haleakala	Pan-STARRS 1	MAR	1.1 km	MPC · JPL
679178	2018 VA_{27}	—	November 19, 2014	Haleakala	Pan-STARRS 1	·	1.4 km	MPC · JPL
679179	2018 VD_{27}	—	December 21, 2006	Kitt Peak	L. H. Wasserman, M. W. Buie	(5)	980 m	MPC · JPL
679180	2018 VE_{27}	—	August 29, 2009	Kitt Peak	Spacewatch	·	1.1 km	MPC · JPL
679181	2018 VF_{27}	—	November 18, 2006	Mount Lemmon	Mount Lemmon Survey	·	860 m	MPC · JPL
679182	2018 VO_{27}	—	March 13, 2016	Haleakala	Pan-STARRS 1	·	1.0 km	MPC · JPL
679183	2018 VZ_{27}	—	November 5, 2018	Mount Lemmon	Mount Lemmon Survey	MIS	1.9 km	MPC · JPL
679184	2018 VB_{28}	—	September 27, 2009	Mount Lemmon	Mount Lemmon Survey	·	1.4 km	MPC · JPL
679185	2018 VV_{29}	—	November 22, 2006	Kitt Peak	Spacewatch	·	1.3 km	MPC · JPL
679186	2018 VY_{30}	—	January 18, 2016	Haleakala	Pan-STARRS 1	·	950 m	MPC · JPL
679187	2018 VG_{31}	—	July 28, 2014	Haleakala	Pan-STARRS 1	·	1.2 km	MPC · JPL
679188	2018 VC_{33}	—	November 18, 2014	Haleakala	Pan-STARRS 1	·	1.4 km	MPC · JPL
679189	2018 VD_{33}	—	November 26, 2014	Mount Lemmon	Mount Lemmon Survey	·	1.4 km	MPC · JPL
679190	2018 VK_{33}	—	October 24, 2005	Palomar	NEAT	·	1.3 km	MPC · JPL
679191	2018 VL_{33}	—	January 23, 2011	Mount Lemmon	Mount Lemmon Survey	·	1.2 km	MPC · JPL
679192	2018 VO_{33}	—	November 20, 2014	Catalina	CSS	·	1.2 km	MPC · JPL
679193	2018 VU_{33}	—	December 1, 2010	Mount Lemmon	Mount Lemmon Survey	·	1.2 km	MPC · JPL
679194	2018 VT_{34}	—	December 20, 2009	Kitt Peak	Spacewatch	·	1.8 km	MPC · JPL
679195	2018 VQ_{43}	—	December 10, 2014	Mount Lemmon	Mount Lemmon Survey	·	1.1 km	MPC · JPL
679196	2018 VL_{44}	—	November 26, 2014	Mount Lemmon	Mount Lemmon Survey	·	950 m	MPC · JPL
679197	2018 VK_{47}	—	September 25, 2008	Kitt Peak	Spacewatch	·	570 m	MPC · JPL
679198	2018 VE_{48}	—	September 19, 2009	Kitt Peak	Spacewatch	·	1.2 km	MPC · JPL
679199	2018 VY_{48}	—	July 11, 2002	Campo Imperatore	CINEOS	·	1.5 km	MPC · JPL
679200	2018 VZ_{50}	—	November 17, 2014	Haleakala	Pan-STARRS 1	·	1.0 km	MPC · JPL

== 679201–679300 ==
back to top

Designation			Discovery			Properties		Ref
Permanent	Provisional	Named after	Date	Site	Discoverer(s)	Category	Diam.	Ref
679201	2018 VT_{51}	—	November 1, 2018	Mount Lemmon	Mount Lemmon Survey	·	1.1 km	MPC · JPL
679202	2018 VT_{52}	—	January 17, 2007	Kitt Peak	Spacewatch	(5)	860 m	MPC · JPL
679203	2018 VO_{54}	—	December 15, 2006	Kitt Peak	Spacewatch	·	1.3 km	MPC · JPL
679204	2018 VU_{54}	—	October 25, 2011	Haleakala	Pan-STARRS 1	·	870 m	MPC · JPL
679205	2018 VC_{55}	—	September 29, 2005	Catalina	CSS	·	1.5 km	MPC · JPL
679206	2018 VO_{57}	—	March 30, 2016	Cerro Tololo-DECam	DECam	·	1.1 km	MPC · JPL
679207	2018 VG_{58}	—	April 1, 2016	Haleakala	Pan-STARRS 1	GEF	1.1 km	MPC · JPL
679208	2018 VW_{59}	—	September 17, 2009	Kitt Peak	Spacewatch	·	1.2 km	MPC · JPL
679209	2018 VB_{61}	—	November 26, 2014	Haleakala	Pan-STARRS 1	·	1.2 km	MPC · JPL
679210	2018 VD_{61}	—	November 2, 2018	Mount Lemmon	Mount Lemmon Survey	·	920 m	MPC · JPL
679211 Gheorghe	2018 VL_{61}	Gheorghe	September 2, 2014	La Palma	EURONEAR	·	970 m	MPC · JPL
679212	2018 VS_{62}	—	January 23, 2011	Mount Lemmon	Mount Lemmon Survey	(5)	1.0 km	MPC · JPL
679213	2018 VW_{62}	—	April 23, 2014	Cerro Tololo	DECam	·	540 m	MPC · JPL
679214	2018 VM_{63}	—	January 2, 2011	Catalina	CSS	·	1.5 km	MPC · JPL
679215	2018 VD_{64}	—	January 28, 2011	Mount Lemmon	Mount Lemmon Survey	·	1.2 km	MPC · JPL
679216	2018 VF_{65}	—	January 29, 2011	Mount Lemmon	Mount Lemmon Survey	·	980 m	MPC · JPL
679217	2018 VQ_{65}	—	January 10, 2007	Kitt Peak	Spacewatch	(5)	920 m	MPC · JPL
679218	2018 VO_{67}	—	January 28, 2011	Mount Lemmon	Mount Lemmon Survey	·	1.1 km	MPC · JPL
679219	2018 VP_{67}	—	November 26, 2014	Haleakala	Pan-STARRS 1	·	1.2 km	MPC · JPL
679220	2018 VM_{68}	—	September 23, 2009	Mount Lemmon	Mount Lemmon Survey	·	1.5 km	MPC · JPL
679221	2018 VP_{68}	—	September 10, 2018	Mount Lemmon	Mount Lemmon Survey	·	1.0 km	MPC · JPL
679222	2018 VV_{68}	—	October 16, 2018	Haleakala	Pan-STARRS 2	·	1.9 km	MPC · JPL
679223	2018 VB_{69}	—	April 5, 2016	Haleakala	Pan-STARRS 1	(194)	1.0 km	MPC · JPL
679224	2018 VT_{69}	—	October 15, 2014	Mount Lemmon	Mount Lemmon Survey	·	1.2 km	MPC · JPL
679225	2018 VJ_{70}	—	September 14, 1994	Kitt Peak	Spacewatch	·	630 m	MPC · JPL
679226	2018 VD_{72}	—	December 23, 2012	Haleakala	Pan-STARRS 1	·	740 m	MPC · JPL
679227	2018 VV_{72}	—	December 13, 2006	Mount Lemmon	Mount Lemmon Survey	·	950 m	MPC · JPL
679228	2018 VY_{72}	—	July 5, 2005	Kitt Peak	Spacewatch	·	1.4 km	MPC · JPL
679229	2018 VL_{73}	—	February 7, 2011	Catalina	CSS	ADE	1.6 km	MPC · JPL
679230	2018 VG_{75}	—	October 21, 2009	Mount Lemmon	Mount Lemmon Survey	·	1.2 km	MPC · JPL
679231	2018 VU_{75}	—	January 27, 2011	Mount Lemmon	Mount Lemmon Survey	·	1.2 km	MPC · JPL
679232	2018 VE_{76}	—	September 20, 2009	Kitt Peak	Spacewatch	HNS	1.1 km	MPC · JPL
679233	2018 VX_{77}	—	November 8, 2009	Mount Lemmon	Mount Lemmon Survey	PAD	1.2 km	MPC · JPL
679234	2018 VP_{79}	—	January 17, 2007	Kitt Peak	Spacewatch	·	1.0 km	MPC · JPL
679235	2018 VP_{81}	—	September 30, 2005	Mount Lemmon	Mount Lemmon Survey	·	1.1 km	MPC · JPL
679236	2018 VR_{81}	—	July 12, 2005	Mount Lemmon	Mount Lemmon Survey	(5)	1.1 km	MPC · JPL
679237	2018 VH_{82}	—	May 19, 2017	Haleakala	Pan-STARRS 1	·	1.2 km	MPC · JPL
679238	2018 VJ_{82}	—	December 13, 2006	Kitt Peak	Spacewatch	·	1.2 km	MPC · JPL
679239	2018 VP_{84}	—	November 18, 2009	Mount Lemmon	Mount Lemmon Survey	·	1.9 km	MPC · JPL
679240	2018 VG_{86}	—	July 1, 2013	Haleakala	Pan-STARRS 1	·	1.4 km	MPC · JPL
679241	2018 VH_{86}	—	November 26, 2014	Haleakala	Pan-STARRS 1	ADE	1.6 km	MPC · JPL
679242	2018 VJ_{86}	—	March 10, 2008	Kitt Peak	Spacewatch	·	1.0 km	MPC · JPL
679243	2018 VQ_{86}	—	August 27, 2011	Haleakala	Pan-STARRS 1	·	610 m	MPC · JPL
679244	2018 VA_{93}	—	November 19, 2006	Kitt Peak	Spacewatch	·	740 m	MPC · JPL
679245	2018 VW_{93}	—	September 13, 2013	Mount Lemmon	Mount Lemmon Survey	GEF	1.1 km	MPC · JPL
679246	2018 VY_{97}	—	April 28, 2011	Mount Lemmon	Mount Lemmon Survey	·	490 m	MPC · JPL
679247	2018 VK_{100}	—	December 14, 2010	Mount Lemmon	Mount Lemmon Survey	KON	1.7 km	MPC · JPL
679248	2018 VF_{103}	—	October 20, 2018	Mount Lemmon	Mount Lemmon Survey	·	1.1 km	MPC · JPL
679249	2018 VO_{103}	—	October 25, 2014	Haleakala	Pan-STARRS 1	·	1.0 km	MPC · JPL
679250	2018 VM_{106}	—	October 1, 2005	Kitt Peak	Spacewatch	·	1.1 km	MPC · JPL
679251	2018 VR_{107}	—	March 31, 2016	Cerro Tololo	DECam	·	1.2 km	MPC · JPL
679252	2018 VY_{108}	—	November 8, 2018	Haleakala	Pan-STARRS 2	·	880 m	MPC · JPL
679253	2018 VD_{109}	—	June 18, 2013	Haleakala	Pan-STARRS 1	·	970 m	MPC · JPL
679254	2018 VL_{111}	—	November 17, 2014	Haleakala	Pan-STARRS 1	·	1.3 km	MPC · JPL
679255	2018 VS_{112}	—	November 8, 2018	Mount Lemmon	Mount Lemmon Survey	·	1.3 km	MPC · JPL
679256	2018 VV_{112}	—	April 19, 2015	Cerro Tololo-DECam	DECam	·	1.6 km	MPC · JPL
679257	2018 VS_{113}	—	November 7, 2018	Mount Lemmon	Mount Lemmon Survey	EUN	850 m	MPC · JPL
679258	2018 VE_{114}	—	November 2, 2018	Mount Lemmon	Mount Lemmon Survey	·	1.6 km	MPC · JPL
679259	2018 VS_{114}	—	May 3, 2016	Cerro Tololo-DECam	DECam	·	1.0 km	MPC · JPL
679260	2018 VX_{115}	—	September 19, 2001	Anderson Mesa	LONEOS	·	1.1 km	MPC · JPL
679261	2018 VF_{116}	—	November 9, 2018	Mount Lemmon	Mount Lemmon Survey	·	1.7 km	MPC · JPL
679262	2018 VK_{117}	—	November 8, 2018	Mount Lemmon	Mount Lemmon Survey	·	1.2 km	MPC · JPL
679263	2018 VV_{117}	—	December 18, 2014	Haleakala	Pan-STARRS 1	·	1.1 km	MPC · JPL
679264	2018 VA_{118}	—	November 25, 2005	Kitt Peak	Spacewatch	·	1.0 km	MPC · JPL
679265	2018 VB_{120}	—	May 1, 2016	Cerro Tololo-DECam	DECam	EUN	830 m	MPC · JPL
679266	2018 VF_{120}	—	November 26, 2014	Haleakala	Pan-STARRS 1	(5)	880 m	MPC · JPL
679267	2018 VT_{121}	—	April 18, 2015	Cerro Tololo-DECam	DECam	·	2.5 km	MPC · JPL
679268	2018 VR_{122}	—	November 8, 2018	Mount Lemmon	Mount Lemmon Survey	·	1.1 km	MPC · JPL
679269	2018 VV_{124}	—	November 7, 2018	Mount Lemmon	Mount Lemmon Survey	EUN	820 m	MPC · JPL
679270	2018 VD_{125}	—	November 5, 2018	Mount Lemmon	Mount Lemmon Survey	·	970 m	MPC · JPL
679271	2018 VJ_{126}	—	November 5, 2018	Haleakala	Pan-STARRS 2	·	1.3 km	MPC · JPL
679272	2018 VT_{126}	—	November 6, 2018	Haleakala	Pan-STARRS 2	·	1.7 km	MPC · JPL
679273	2018 VG_{127}	—	November 5, 2018	Mount Lemmon	Mount Lemmon Survey	·	790 m	MPC · JPL
679274	2018 VG_{128}	—	November 6, 2018	Mount Lemmon	Mount Lemmon Survey	(194)	1.2 km	MPC · JPL
679275	2018 VL_{130}	—	November 2, 2018	Mount Lemmon	Mount Lemmon Survey	·	760 m	MPC · JPL
679276	2018 VW_{133}	—	March 28, 2016	Cerro Tololo-DECam	DECam	·	1.1 km	MPC · JPL
679277	2018 VU_{138}	—	November 7, 2018	Haleakala	Pan-STARRS 2	·	1.1 km	MPC · JPL
679278	2018 VN_{140}	—	November 4, 2018	Mount Lemmon	Mount Lemmon Survey	·	910 m	MPC · JPL
679279	2018 VN_{141}	—	November 9, 2018	Haleakala	Pan-STARRS 2	·	1.1 km	MPC · JPL
679280	2018 VG_{143}	—	November 4, 2018	Mount Lemmon	Mount Lemmon Survey	MAR	750 m	MPC · JPL
679281	2018 VA_{146}	—	February 17, 2007	Mount Lemmon	Mount Lemmon Survey	ADE	1.4 km	MPC · JPL
679282	2018 WW_{4}	—	March 28, 2016	Cerro Tololo-DECam	DECam	·	1.1 km	MPC · JPL
679283	2018 WS_{5}	—	November 17, 2018	Mount Lemmon	Mount Lemmon Survey	(5)	790 m	MPC · JPL
679284	2018 WJ_{6}	—	November 18, 2018	Mount Lemmon	Mount Lemmon Survey	·	1.4 km	MPC · JPL
679285	2018 WQ_{6}	—	March 12, 2016	Haleakala	Pan-STARRS 1	·	950 m	MPC · JPL
679286	2018 WZ_{8}	—	September 30, 2005	Catalina	CSS	·	1.1 km	MPC · JPL
679287	2018 WP_{10}	—	November 17, 2018	Mount Lemmon	Mount Lemmon Survey	·	1.0 km	MPC · JPL
679288	2018 WF_{12}	—	November 28, 2018	Mount Lemmon	Mount Lemmon Survey	·	1.4 km	MPC · JPL
679289	2018 XK	—	December 26, 2014	Haleakala	Pan-STARRS 1	·	1.4 km	MPC · JPL
679290	2018 XZ_{6}	—	November 2, 2018	Mount Lemmon	Mount Lemmon Survey	·	1.2 km	MPC · JPL
679291	2018 XA_{7}	—	November 19, 2014	Haleakala	Pan-STARRS 1	·	1.2 km	MPC · JPL
679292	2018 XC_{7}	—	November 19, 2014	Mount Lemmon	Mount Lemmon Survey	·	1.3 km	MPC · JPL
679293	2018 XD_{7}	—	January 14, 2011	Mount Lemmon	Mount Lemmon Survey	·	1.4 km	MPC · JPL
679294	2018 XE_{8}	—	November 20, 2001	Socorro	LINEAR	EUN	1.0 km	MPC · JPL
679295	2018 XO_{8}	—	December 12, 2014	Haleakala	Pan-STARRS 1	·	1.3 km	MPC · JPL
679296	2018 XT_{8}	—	December 4, 2005	Mount Lemmon	Mount Lemmon Survey	·	740 m	MPC · JPL
679297	2018 XX_{8}	—	April 12, 2016	Haleakala	Pan-STARRS 1	·	1.2 km	MPC · JPL
679298	2018 XF_{9}	—	November 17, 2014	Haleakala	Pan-STARRS 1	(10369)	1.6 km	MPC · JPL
679299	2018 XZ_{9}	—	November 8, 2009	Kitt Peak	Spacewatch	·	1.6 km	MPC · JPL
679300	2018 XD_{10}	—	November 9, 2018	Haleakala	Pan-STARRS 2	(5)	990 m	MPC · JPL

== 679301–679400 ==
back to top

Designation			Discovery			Properties		Ref
Permanent	Provisional	Named after	Date	Site	Discoverer(s)	Category	Diam.	Ref
679301	2018 XK_{10}	—	May 23, 2012	Mount Lemmon	Mount Lemmon Survey	·	1.2 km	MPC · JPL
679302	2018 XZ_{10}	—	December 5, 2005	Kitt Peak	Spacewatch	·	1.2 km	MPC · JPL
679303	2018 XO_{12}	—	March 2, 2011	Catalina	CSS	(5)	1.1 km	MPC · JPL
679304	2018 XH_{14}	—	November 27, 2006	Mount Lemmon	Mount Lemmon Survey	·	1.3 km	MPC · JPL
679305	2018 XC_{15}	—	March 29, 2016	Cerro Tololo-DECam	DECam	·	1.1 km	MPC · JPL
679306	2018 XU_{15}	—	October 15, 2009	Mount Lemmon	Mount Lemmon Survey	·	1.4 km	MPC · JPL
679307	2018 XV_{15}	—	November 24, 2009	Kitt Peak	Spacewatch	·	1.7 km	MPC · JPL
679308	2018 XE_{16}	—	February 25, 2007	Mount Lemmon	Mount Lemmon Survey	·	1.1 km	MPC · JPL
679309	2018 XU_{16}	—	December 14, 2018	Haleakala	Pan-STARRS 1	·	1.7 km	MPC · JPL
679310	2018 XS_{17}	—	December 5, 2010	Mount Lemmon	Mount Lemmon Survey	(194)	1.4 km	MPC · JPL
679311	2018 XD_{18}	—	December 8, 2010	Mount Lemmon	Mount Lemmon Survey	·	1.1 km	MPC · JPL
679312	2018 XS_{18}	—	December 26, 2006	Kitt Peak	Spacewatch	(5)	900 m	MPC · JPL
679313	2018 XX_{18}	—	December 3, 2018	Palomar	Zwicky Transient Facility	·	1.3 km	MPC · JPL
679314	2018 XB_{19}	—	October 4, 2014	Haleakala	Pan-STARRS 1	·	1.2 km	MPC · JPL
679315	2018 XU_{21}	—	December 12, 2018	Haleakala	Pan-STARRS 1	·	1.4 km	MPC · JPL
679316	2018 XD_{23}	—	December 12, 2018	Haleakala	Pan-STARRS 1	HNS	970 m	MPC · JPL
679317	2018 XN_{24}	—	April 23, 2015	Haleakala	Pan-STARRS 2	·	1.5 km	MPC · JPL
679318	2018 XO_{24}	—	December 14, 2018	Mount Lemmon	Mount Lemmon Survey	·	1.1 km	MPC · JPL
679319	2018 XY_{24}	—	December 14, 2018	Haleakala	Pan-STARRS 1	·	1.5 km	MPC · JPL
679320	2018 XC_{25}	—	May 11, 2015	Mount Lemmon	Mount Lemmon Survey	DOR	1.7 km	MPC · JPL
679321	2018 XJ_{25}	—	December 13, 2018	Haleakala	Pan-STARRS 1	H	440 m	MPC · JPL
679322	2018 XV_{25}	—	April 18, 2015	Cerro Tololo	DECam	·	1.5 km	MPC · JPL
679323	2018 XG_{29}	—	December 13, 2018	Haleakala	Pan-STARRS 1	·	1.6 km	MPC · JPL
679324	2018 XP_{32}	—	December 4, 2018	Mount Lemmon	Mount Lemmon Survey	H	380 m	MPC · JPL
679325	2018 XB_{34}	—	August 28, 2014	Haleakala	Pan-STARRS 1	·	690 m	MPC · JPL
679326	2018 YF_{1}	—	October 27, 2009	Catalina	CSS	·	1.5 km	MPC · JPL
679327	2018 YH_{1}	—	December 8, 2013	Nogales	M. Schwartz, P. R. Holvorcem	·	2.2 km	MPC · JPL
679328	2018 YK_{5}	—	October 24, 2005	Mauna Kea	A. Boattini	·	1.3 km	MPC · JPL
679329	2018 YA_{6}	—	April 18, 2015	Cerro Tololo-DECam	DECam	·	1.3 km	MPC · JPL
679330	2018 YM_{8}	—	December 17, 2018	Haleakala	Pan-STARRS 1	·	2.0 km	MPC · JPL
679331	2018 YV_{8}	—	December 16, 2018	Haleakala	Pan-STARRS 1	BRA	1.0 km	MPC · JPL
679332	2018 YJ_{10}	—	December 17, 2018	Haleakala	Pan-STARRS 1	·	1.6 km	MPC · JPL
679333	2018 YR_{12}	—	December 17, 2018	Haleakala	Pan-STARRS 1	·	2.7 km	MPC · JPL
679334	2018 YM_{13}	—	April 3, 2016	Haleakala	Pan-STARRS 1	PHO	800 m	MPC · JPL
679335	2019 AA	—	April 3, 2017	Mount Lemmon	Mount Lemmon Survey	H	550 m	MPC · JPL
679336	2019 AP_{4}	—	April 2, 2011	Catalina	CSS	·	1.8 km	MPC · JPL
679337	2019 AQ_{4}	—	January 3, 2019	Haleakala	Pan-STARRS 1	APO	520 m	MPC · JPL
679338	2019 AB_{7}	—	January 8, 2019	Haleakala	Pan-STARRS 1	centaur	70 km	MPC · JPL
679339	2019 AG_{9}	—	July 5, 2003	Kitt Peak	Spacewatch	·	980 m	MPC · JPL
679340	2019 AA_{13}	—	May 15, 2012	Haleakala	Pan-STARRS 1	H	350 m	MPC · JPL
679341	2019 AQ_{15}	—	January 13, 2002	Socorro	LINEAR	EUN	1 km	MPC · JPL
679342	2019 AY_{17}	—	September 6, 2008	Catalina	CSS	·	1.6 km	MPC · JPL
679343	2019 AT_{19}	—	October 24, 2013	Mount Lemmon	Mount Lemmon Survey	(18466)	1.7 km	MPC · JPL
679344	2019 AV_{19}	—	November 27, 2014	Mount Lemmon	Mount Lemmon Survey	·	1.6 km	MPC · JPL
679345	2019 AV_{20}	—	October 24, 2013	Mount Lemmon	Mount Lemmon Survey	·	1.0 km	MPC · JPL
679346	2019 AM_{22}	—	September 6, 2008	Mount Lemmon	Mount Lemmon Survey	·	1.5 km	MPC · JPL
679347	2019 AU_{24}	—	December 6, 2005	Kitt Peak	Spacewatch	JUN	960 m	MPC · JPL
679348	2019 AB_{25}	—	January 1, 2014	Haleakala	Pan-STARRS 1	·	2.2 km	MPC · JPL
679349	2019 AT_{25}	—	October 8, 2012	Mount Lemmon	Mount Lemmon Survey	·	1.9 km	MPC · JPL
679350	2019 AE_{26}	—	January 3, 2019	Palomar	Zwicky Transient Facility	H	480 m	MPC · JPL
679351	2019 AV_{27}	—	October 8, 2013	Kitt Peak	Spacewatch	·	1.8 km	MPC · JPL
679352	2019 AT_{28}	—	December 22, 2012	Haleakala	Pan-STARRS 1	(895)	2.8 km	MPC · JPL
679353	2019 AJ_{29}	—	February 27, 2015	Haleakala	Pan-STARRS 1	·	1.8 km	MPC · JPL
679354	2019 AR_{29}	—	January 2, 2019	Haleakala	Pan-STARRS 1	·	1.6 km	MPC · JPL
679355	2019 AO_{31}	—	November 4, 2013	Haleakala	Pan-STARRS 1	HNS	910 m	MPC · JPL
679356	2019 AM_{32}	—	December 16, 2018	Haleakala	Pan-STARRS 1	·	1.8 km	MPC · JPL
679357	2019 AT_{33}	—	August 28, 2009	La Sagra	OAM	·	1.3 km	MPC · JPL
679358	2019 AL_{36}	—	October 25, 2013	Mount Lemmon	Mount Lemmon Survey	·	930 m	MPC · JPL
679359	2019 AH_{37}	—	November 6, 2013	Haleakala	Pan-STARRS 1	·	1.3 km	MPC · JPL
679360	2019 AD_{39}	—	November 27, 2013	Haleakala	Pan-STARRS 1	DOR	1.8 km	MPC · JPL
679361	2019 AT_{42}	—	December 25, 2011	Mount Lemmon	Mount Lemmon Survey	·	600 m	MPC · JPL
679362	2019 AT_{44}	—	February 9, 2005	Mount Lemmon	Mount Lemmon Survey	·	830 m	MPC · JPL
679363	2019 AU_{44}	—	January 8, 2019	Haleakala	Pan-STARRS 1	·	1.4 km	MPC · JPL
679364	2019 AR_{45}	—	October 4, 1994	Kitt Peak	Spacewatch	·	1.2 km	MPC · JPL
679365	2019 AE_{46}	—	November 27, 2013	Haleakala	Pan-STARRS 1	·	1.2 km	MPC · JPL
679366	2019 AW_{46}	—	January 7, 2019	Haleakala	Pan-STARRS 1	·	1.9 km	MPC · JPL
679367	2019 AX_{46}	—	January 6, 2010	Kitt Peak	Spacewatch	·	1.3 km	MPC · JPL
679368	2019 AO_{47}	—	October 10, 2012	Haleakala	Pan-STARRS 1	·	1.4 km	MPC · JPL
679369	2019 AU_{47}	—	January 10, 2006	Mount Lemmon	Mount Lemmon Survey	·	1.1 km	MPC · JPL
679370	2019 AV_{53}	—	April 18, 2015	Mount Lemmon	Mount Lemmon Survey	·	1.6 km	MPC · JPL
679371	2019 AB_{58}	—	January 13, 2019	Haleakala	Pan-STARRS 1	·	550 m	MPC · JPL
679372	2019 AK_{61}	—	January 11, 2019	Haleakala	Pan-STARRS 1	·	2.3 km	MPC · JPL
679373	2019 AQ_{62}	—	January 7, 2019	Haleakala	Pan-STARRS 1	·	1.4 km	MPC · JPL
679374	2019 AF_{64}	—	January 8, 2019	Haleakala	Pan-STARRS 1	H	490 m	MPC · JPL
679375	2019 AC_{67}	—	April 10, 2015	Mount Lemmon	Mount Lemmon Survey	HOF	1.8 km	MPC · JPL
679376	2019 AL_{77}	—	January 4, 2019	Mount Lemmon	Mount Lemmon Survey	H	450 m	MPC · JPL
679377	2019 AU_{80}	—	May 20, 2015	Cerro Tololo-DECam	DECam	KOR	1.0 km	MPC · JPL
679378	2019 AE_{84}	—	January 14, 2019	Haleakala	Pan-STARRS 1	·	1.5 km	MPC · JPL
679379	2019 AL_{84}	—	November 1, 2013	Catalina	CSS	·	1.2 km	MPC · JPL
679380	2019 AN_{86}	—	September 18, 2012	Mount Lemmon	Mount Lemmon Survey	·	1.5 km	MPC · JPL
679381	2019 AC_{92}	—	January 14, 2019	Haleakala	Pan-STARRS 1	·	1.1 km	MPC · JPL
679382	2019 AL_{98}	—	December 10, 2017	Haleakala	Pan-STARRS 1	·	2.3 km	MPC · JPL
679383	2019 BE	—	November 15, 2006	Mount Lemmon	Mount Lemmon Survey	BAR	1.1 km	MPC · JPL
679384	2019 BP	—	February 18, 2008	Catalina	CSS	·	2.3 km	MPC · JPL
679385	2019 BS	—	April 10, 2014	Haleakala	Pan-STARRS 1	H	460 m	MPC · JPL
679386	2019 BY	—	January 15, 2016	Mount Lemmon	Mount Lemmon Survey	H	490 m	MPC · JPL
679387	2019 BP_{3}	—	April 28, 2014	Haleakala	Pan-STARRS 1	H	530 m	MPC · JPL
679388	2019 BS_{5}	—	December 29, 2014	Haleakala	Pan-STARRS 1	·	1.7 km	MPC · JPL
679389	2019 BT_{5}	—	January 28, 2015	Haleakala	Pan-STARRS 1	·	1.3 km	MPC · JPL
679390	2019 BM_{6}	—	September 9, 2008	Kitt Peak	Spacewatch	·	390 m	MPC · JPL
679391	2019 BO_{6}	—	January 3, 2019	Haleakala	Pan-STARRS 1	·	1.6 km	MPC · JPL
679392	2019 BA_{7}	—	December 22, 2012	Haleakala	Pan-STARRS 1	·	3.5 km	MPC · JPL
679393	2019 BE_{7}	—	December 7, 2005	Kitt Peak	Spacewatch	HNS	1.2 km	MPC · JPL
679394	2019 BX_{7}	—	March 1, 2009	Kitt Peak	Spacewatch	·	1.8 km	MPC · JPL
679395	2019 BH_{8}	—	November 17, 2009	Mount Lemmon	Mount Lemmon Survey	ADE	1.7 km	MPC · JPL
679396	2019 BK_{8}	—	March 22, 2015	Haleakala	Pan-STARRS 1	BRA	1.1 km	MPC · JPL
679397	2019 CD	—	September 27, 2002	Palomar	NEAT	H	340 m	MPC · JPL
679398	2019 CE_{2}	—	June 1, 2017	Haleakala	Pan-STARRS 1	H	410 m	MPC · JPL
679399	2019 CJ_{3}	—	February 8, 2019	Palomar	Zwicky Transient Facility	centaur	100 km	MPC · JPL
679400	2019 CQ_{3}	—	November 2, 2013	Kitt Peak	Spacewatch	·	310 m	MPC · JPL

== 679401–679500 ==
back to top

Designation			Discovery			Properties		Ref
Permanent	Provisional	Named after	Date	Site	Discoverer(s)	Category	Diam.	Ref
679401	2019 CV_{3}	—	September 16, 2003	Kitt Peak	Spacewatch	H	360 m	MPC · JPL
679402	2019 CZ_{6}	—	January 25, 2006	Kitt Peak	Spacewatch	H	510 m	MPC · JPL
679403	2019 CC_{7}	—	July 21, 2012	Siding Spring	SSS	H	500 m	MPC · JPL
679404	2019 CQ_{7}	—	March 2, 2006	Kitt Peak	Spacewatch	·	510 m	MPC · JPL
679405	2019 CB_{8}	—	November 28, 2013	Mount Lemmon	Mount Lemmon Survey	·	1.2 km	MPC · JPL
679406	2019 CL_{9}	—	February 16, 2010	Mount Lemmon	Mount Lemmon Survey	·	1.4 km	MPC · JPL
679407	2019 CU_{10}	—	September 28, 2013	Catalina	CSS	·	1.3 km	MPC · JPL
679408	2019 CB_{11}	—	February 8, 2019	Haleakala	Pan-STARRS 1	·	2.6 km	MPC · JPL
679409	2019 CM_{11}	—	February 26, 2008	Mount Lemmon	Mount Lemmon Survey	·	1.6 km	MPC · JPL
679410	2019 CM_{13}	—	April 28, 2014	Cerro Tololo-DECam	DECam	·	1.7 km	MPC · JPL
679411	2019 CF_{14}	—	February 4, 2019	Haleakala	Pan-STARRS 1	·	1.9 km	MPC · JPL
679412	2019 CK_{14}	—	February 8, 2019	Mount Lemmon	Mount Lemmon Survey	·	2.3 km	MPC · JPL
679413	2019 CT_{14}	—	February 9, 2019	Mount Lemmon	Mount Lemmon Survey	EUP	2.5 km	MPC · JPL
679414	2019 CO_{15}	—	February 4, 2019	Haleakala	Pan-STARRS 2	H	350 m	MPC · JPL
679415	2019 CR_{15}	—	February 8, 2019	Mount Lemmon	Mount Lemmon Survey	H	300 m	MPC · JPL
679416	2019 CA_{19}	—	September 12, 2016	Mount Lemmon	Mount Lemmon Survey	·	2.6 km	MPC · JPL
679417	2019 CS_{21}	—	November 3, 2011	Mount Lemmon	Mount Lemmon Survey	·	2.4 km	MPC · JPL
679418	2019 DF_{3}	—	February 28, 2019	Mount Lemmon	Mount Lemmon Survey	H	380 m	MPC · JPL
679419	2019 EC	—	December 8, 2012	Nogales	M. Schwartz, P. R. Holvorcem	T_{j} (2.93)	2.4 km	MPC · JPL
679420	2019 EV_{2}	—	March 15, 2019	Mount Lemmon	Mount Lemmon Survey	APO	430 m	MPC · JPL
679421	2019 EO_{3}	—	January 18, 2013	Haleakala	Pan-STARRS 1	·	2.4 km	MPC · JPL
679422	2019 EQ_{3}	—	March 15, 2019	Mount Lemmon	Mount Lemmon Survey	LIX	2.6 km	MPC · JPL
679423	2019 EU_{3}	—	March 15, 2019	Mount Lemmon	Mount Lemmon Survey	·	2.7 km	MPC · JPL
679424	2019 ER_{4}	—	March 5, 2019	Mount Lemmon	Mount Lemmon Survey	H	460 m	MPC · JPL
679425	2019 EY_{5}	—	March 12, 2019	Cerro Paranal	Altmann, M., Prusti, T.	EOS	1.4 km	MPC · JPL
679426	2019 FL_{3}	—	September 15, 2010	Mount Lemmon	Mount Lemmon Survey	·	820 m	MPC · JPL
679427	2019 FM_{3}	—	February 5, 2009	Mount Lemmon	Mount Lemmon Survey	·	900 m	MPC · JPL
679428	2019 FL_{4}	—	October 17, 2012	Mount Lemmon	Mount Lemmon Survey	·	1.6 km	MPC · JPL
679429	2019 FT_{4}	—	April 3, 2008	Catalina	CSS	PHO	900 m	MPC · JPL
679430	2019 FN_{6}	—	April 28, 2014	Cerro Tololo-DECam	DECam	·	2.2 km	MPC · JPL
679431	2019 FN_{7}	—	March 31, 2019	Mount Lemmon	Mount Lemmon Survey	·	1.7 km	MPC · JPL
679432	2019 FF_{8}	—	March 29, 2019	Mount Lemmon	Mount Lemmon Survey	·	1.8 km	MPC · JPL
679433	2019 FX_{10}	—	September 12, 2015	Haleakala	Pan-STARRS 1	·	2.2 km	MPC · JPL
679434	2019 FC_{20}	—	March 24, 2014	Haleakala	Pan-STARRS 1	EOS	1.3 km	MPC · JPL
679435	2019 FP_{21}	—	March 17, 2019	Mount Lemmon	Mount Lemmon Survey	H	520 m	MPC · JPL
679436	2019 FN_{27}	—	April 18, 2015	Cerro Tololo-DECam	DECam	·	1.3 km	MPC · JPL
679437	2019 GH	—	March 31, 2014	Kitt Peak	Spacewatch	H	420 m	MPC · JPL
679438	2019 GY_{1}	—	March 4, 2011	Catalina	CSS	H	580 m	MPC · JPL
679439	2019 GH_{2}	—	April 5, 2019	Haleakala	Pan-STARRS 1	H	350 m	MPC · JPL
679440	2019 GT_{2}	—	April 3, 2019	Haleakala	Pan-STARRS 1	APO · PHA	540 m	MPC · JPL
679441	2019 GW_{6}	—	October 6, 2008	Mount Lemmon	Mount Lemmon Survey	·	1.6 km	MPC · JPL
679442	2019 GD_{12}	—	May 21, 2012	Mount Lemmon	Mount Lemmon Survey	·	1.2 km	MPC · JPL
679443	2019 GG_{12}	—	March 13, 2005	Catalina	CSS	·	2.1 km	MPC · JPL
679444	2019 GK_{14}	—	September 8, 2015	Haleakala	Pan-STARRS 1	·	2.9 km	MPC · JPL
679445	2019 GM_{16}	—	August 29, 2006	Kitt Peak	Spacewatch	·	2.0 km	MPC · JPL
679446	2019 GQ_{16}	—	May 3, 2014	Mount Lemmon	Mount Lemmon Survey	·	2.3 km	MPC · JPL
679447	2019 GF_{17}	—	February 3, 2013	Haleakala	Pan-STARRS 1	·	2.1 km	MPC · JPL
679448	2019 GQ_{18}	—	April 5, 2019	Haleakala	Pan-STARRS 1	H	310 m	MPC · JPL
679449	2019 GS_{18}	—	October 11, 2007	Catalina	CSS	H	380 m	MPC · JPL
679450	2019 GJ_{22}	—	November 10, 2010	Mount Lemmon	Mount Lemmon Survey	TIR	2.4 km	MPC · JPL
679451	2019 GL_{22}	—	October 23, 2011	Haleakala	Pan-STARRS 1	·	2.2 km	MPC · JPL
679452	2019 GE_{23}	—	April 1, 2005	Catalina	CSS	·	2.2 km	MPC · JPL
679453	2019 GS_{24}	—	April 3, 2019	Haleakala	Pan-STARRS 1	H	340 m	MPC · JPL
679454	2019 GG_{27}	—	April 4, 2019	Haleakala	Pan-STARRS 1	TIR	1.8 km	MPC · JPL
679455	2019 GC_{28}	—	April 7, 2019	Haleakala	Pan-STARRS 1	·	2.1 km	MPC · JPL
679456	2019 GO_{29}	—	April 4, 2019	Haleakala	Pan-STARRS 1	·	2.6 km	MPC · JPL
679457	2019 GW_{30}	—	April 4, 2019	Haleakala	Pan-STARRS 1	·	2.0 km	MPC · JPL
679458	2019 GK_{32}	—	January 23, 2018	Mount Lemmon	Mount Lemmon Survey	·	2.4 km	MPC · JPL
679459	2019 GG_{35}	—	April 7, 2019	Mount Lemmon	Mount Lemmon Survey	·	2.0 km	MPC · JPL
679460	2019 GQ_{37}	—	April 14, 2019	Mount Lemmon	Mount Lemmon Survey	H	300 m	MPC · JPL
679461	2019 GK_{38}	—	October 28, 2005	Kitt Peak	Spacewatch	·	1.9 km	MPC · JPL
679462	2019 GW_{49}	—	April 3, 2019	Haleakala	Pan-STARRS 1	·	1.7 km	MPC · JPL
679463	2019 GP_{50}	—	May 2, 2014	Mount Lemmon	Mount Lemmon Survey	·	1.3 km	MPC · JPL
679464	2019 GV_{50}	—	April 4, 2019	Haleakala	Pan-STARRS 1	·	2.9 km	MPC · JPL
679465	2019 GA_{51}	—	April 3, 2019	Haleakala	Pan-STARRS 1	·	2.1 km	MPC · JPL
679466	2019 GN_{52}	—	April 6, 2019	Haleakala	Pan-STARRS 1	H	380 m	MPC · JPL
679467	2019 GY_{54}	—	April 4, 2019	Haleakala	Pan-STARRS 1	EUP	2.6 km	MPC · JPL
679468	2019 GL_{58}	—	April 14, 2019	Mount Lemmon	Mount Lemmon Survey	EUP	2.5 km	MPC · JPL
679469	2019 GW_{58}	—	May 5, 2014	Cerro Tololo	DECam	·	2.3 km	MPC · JPL
679470	2019 GT_{59}	—	February 21, 2007	Mount Lemmon	Mount Lemmon Survey	·	2.1 km	MPC · JPL
679471	2019 GX_{59}	—	April 3, 2019	Haleakala	Pan-STARRS 1	·	2.5 km	MPC · JPL
679472	2019 GA_{67}	—	April 4, 2019	Haleakala	Pan-STARRS 1	·	640 m	MPC · JPL
679473	2019 GL_{90}	—	April 3, 2019	Mount Lemmon	Mount Lemmon Survey	·	2.5 km	MPC · JPL
679474	2019 GQ_{98}	—	April 3, 2019	Haleakala	Pan-STARRS 1	·	2.0 km	MPC · JPL
679475	2019 GC_{100}	—	September 16, 2009	Kitt Peak	Spacewatch	·	2.8 km	MPC · JPL
679476	2019 GX_{110}	—	April 3, 2019	Haleakala	Pan-STARRS 1	L5	6.4 km	MPC · JPL
679477	2019 GY_{113}	—	June 2, 2014	Haleakala	Pan-STARRS 1	·	1.8 km	MPC · JPL
679478	2019 GS_{117}	—	April 5, 2019	Haleakala	Pan-STARRS 1	·	1.7 km	MPC · JPL
679479	2019 GY_{117}	—	July 19, 2015	Haleakala	Pan-STARRS 1	·	2.9 km	MPC · JPL
679480	2019 GS_{122}	—	April 24, 2014	Cerro Tololo	DECam	·	1.3 km	MPC · JPL
679481	2019 GB_{124}	—	April 7, 2019	Haleakala	Pan-STARRS 1	EUN	960 m	MPC · JPL
679482	2019 GX_{124}	—	May 20, 2015	Cerro Tololo	DECam	AGN	1.0 km	MPC · JPL
679483	2019 GJ_{129}	—	May 9, 2014	Haleakala	Pan-STARRS 1	EOS	1.1 km	MPC · JPL
679484	2019 GQ_{131}	—	October 26, 2016	Haleakala	Pan-STARRS 1	·	1.4 km	MPC · JPL
679485	2019 GZ_{151}	—	April 6, 2019	Haleakala	Pan-STARRS 1	·	1.7 km	MPC · JPL
679486	2019 HO_{1}	—	May 10, 2014	Haleakala	Pan-STARRS 1	·	1.7 km	MPC · JPL
679487	2019 HU_{4}	—	October 31, 2010	Mount Lemmon	Mount Lemmon Survey	·	2.7 km	MPC · JPL
679488	2019 HX_{5}	—	February 29, 2008	Kitt Peak	Spacewatch	·	1.9 km	MPC · JPL
679489	2019 HG_{8}	—	April 26, 2019	Mount Lemmon	Mount Lemmon Survey	HYG	2.2 km	MPC · JPL
679490	2019 HG_{13}	—	April 24, 2019	Haleakala	Pan-STARRS 1	H	510 m	MPC · JPL
679491	2019 JV	—	November 30, 2015	Haleakala	Pan-STARRS 1	H	550 m	MPC · JPL
679492	2019 JV_{6}	—	April 1, 2019	Mount Lemmon	Mount Lemmon Survey	H	430 m	MPC · JPL
679493	2019 JW_{10}	—	March 29, 2019	Mount Lemmon	Mount Lemmon Survey	·	2.1 km	MPC · JPL
679494	2019 JO_{11}	—	June 2, 2008	Mount Lemmon	Mount Lemmon Survey	·	3.0 km	MPC · JPL
679495	2019 JK_{14}	—	February 17, 2007	Kitt Peak	Spacewatch	MAS	700 m	MPC · JPL
679496	2019 JR_{21}	—	October 9, 2007	Kitt Peak	Spacewatch	HOF	2.4 km	MPC · JPL
679497	2019 JJ_{27}	—	October 8, 2015	Haleakala	Pan-STARRS 1	·	2.7 km	MPC · JPL
679498	2019 JX_{27}	—	September 20, 2009	Kitt Peak	Spacewatch	(260)	2.6 km	MPC · JPL
679499	2019 JU_{29}	—	November 19, 2015	Mount Lemmon	Mount Lemmon Survey	·	3.0 km	MPC · JPL
679500	2019 JO_{31}	—	October 8, 2008	Catalina	CSS	·	1.3 km	MPC · JPL

== 679501–679600 ==
back to top

Designation			Discovery			Properties		Ref
Permanent	Provisional	Named after	Date	Site	Discoverer(s)	Category	Diam.	Ref
679501	2019 JP_{31}	—	October 14, 2010	Mount Lemmon	Mount Lemmon Survey	·	3.0 km	MPC · JPL
679502	2019 JR_{31}	—	March 13, 2013	Mount Lemmon	Mount Lemmon Survey	·	1.9 km	MPC · JPL
679503	2019 JB_{34}	—	October 3, 2015	Mount Lemmon	Mount Lemmon Survey	·	2.5 km	MPC · JPL
679504	2019 JL_{35}	—	February 10, 2018	Haleakala	Pan-STARRS 1	·	2.8 km	MPC · JPL
679505	2019 JQ_{35}	—	February 10, 2018	Mount Lemmon	Mount Lemmon Survey	·	2.7 km	MPC · JPL
679506	2019 JA_{42}	—	September 23, 2015	Haleakala	Pan-STARRS 1	·	2.6 km	MPC · JPL
679507	2019 JK_{42}	—	October 23, 2011	Haleakala	Pan-STARRS 1	EOS	1.7 km	MPC · JPL
679508	2019 JJ_{43}	—	December 26, 2005	Mount Lemmon	Mount Lemmon Survey	·	2.9 km	MPC · JPL
679509	2019 JD_{45}	—	January 28, 2014	Mount Lemmon	Mount Lemmon Survey	MAR	1.0 km	MPC · JPL
679510	2019 JV_{46}	—	November 10, 2010	Mount Lemmon	Mount Lemmon Survey	EOS	1.6 km	MPC · JPL
679511	2019 JQ_{48}	—	May 11, 2008	Catalina	CSS	·	1.1 km	MPC · JPL
679512	2019 JF_{53}	—	May 1, 2019	Haleakala	Pan-STARRS 1	·	3.0 km	MPC · JPL
679513	2019 JO_{58}	—	September 9, 2015	Haleakala	Pan-STARRS 1	·	2.1 km	MPC · JPL
679514	2019 JK_{60}	—	May 1, 2019	Haleakala	Pan-STARRS 1	·	2.4 km	MPC · JPL
679515	2019 JT_{62}	—	May 1, 2019	Haleakala	Pan-STARRS 1	·	2.5 km	MPC · JPL
679516	2019 JT_{66}	—	May 1, 2019	Mount Lemmon	Mount Lemmon Survey	·	2.7 km	MPC · JPL
679517	2019 JU_{66}	—	May 1, 2019	Mount Lemmon	Mount Lemmon Survey	·	2.6 km	MPC · JPL
679518	2019 JG_{68}	—	May 2, 2019	Haleakala	Pan-STARRS 1	·	2.8 km	MPC · JPL
679519	2019 JM_{68}	—	October 29, 2017	Haleakala	Pan-STARRS 1	H	370 m	MPC · JPL
679520	2019 JZ_{79}	—	May 2, 2019	Haleakala	Pan-STARRS 1	·	1.2 km	MPC · JPL
679521	2019 JV_{101}	—	May 9, 2019	Haleakala	Pan-STARRS 1	T_{j} (2.97) · EUP	3.1 km	MPC · JPL
679522	2019 JB_{136}	—	May 4, 2019	Haleakala	Pan-STARRS 1	·	1.8 km	MPC · JPL
679523	2019 KN_{1}	—	August 23, 2017	Haleakala	Pan-STARRS 1	H	430 m	MPC · JPL
679524	2019 KW_{2}	—	June 2, 2014	Mount Lemmon	Mount Lemmon Survey	H	460 m	MPC · JPL
679525	2019 KO_{4}	—	May 29, 2019	Haleakala	Pan-STARRS 1	L4	10 km	MPC · JPL
679526	2019 KE_{10}	—	April 4, 2008	Kitt Peak	Spacewatch	·	1.0 km	MPC · JPL
679527	2019 KO_{23}	—	May 25, 2019	Haleakala	Pan-STARRS 1	URS	3.2 km	MPC · JPL
679528	2019 KR_{24}	—	May 30, 2019	Haleakala	Pan-STARRS 1	·	2.2 km	MPC · JPL
679529	2019 KT_{24}	—	May 25, 2019	Haleakala	Pan-STARRS 1	·	2.6 km	MPC · JPL
679530	2019 KV_{31}	—	October 2, 2015	Mount Lemmon	Mount Lemmon Survey	VER	2.1 km	MPC · JPL
679531	2019 KF_{54}	—	October 10, 2016	Haleakala	Pan-STARRS 1	·	3.0 km	MPC · JPL
679532	2019 LC_{2}	—	June 4, 2005	Kitt Peak	Spacewatch	L4	9.4 km	MPC · JPL
679533	2019 LW_{9}	—	November 25, 2011	Haleakala	Pan-STARRS 1	·	1.2 km	MPC · JPL
679534	2019 LY_{9}	—	June 1, 2019	Haleakala	Pan-STARRS 2	PHO	790 m	MPC · JPL
679535	2019 LB_{15}	—	June 2, 2019	Haleakala	Pan-STARRS 1	VER	2.4 km	MPC · JPL
679536	2019 LN_{16}	—	June 2, 2019	Haleakala	Pan-STARRS 1	·	2.9 km	MPC · JPL
679537	2019 LR_{17}	—	June 1, 2019	Haleakala	Pan-STARRS 2	VER	2.0 km	MPC · JPL
679538	2019 MC_{1}	—	July 25, 2003	Palomar	NEAT	T_{j} (2.96)	4.1 km	MPC · JPL
679539	2019 MN_{4}	—	June 30, 2019	Haleakala	Pan-STARRS 1	·	1.3 km	MPC · JPL
679540	2019 MA_{7}	—	June 24, 2019	Palomar	Zwicky Transient Facility	BAR	1.0 km	MPC · JPL
679541	2019 MQ_{15}	—	April 18, 2015	Cerro Tololo-DECam	DECam	L4	6.2 km	MPC · JPL
679542	2019 NT_{3}	—	April 18, 2010	WISE	WISE	L5	9.0 km	MPC · JPL
679543	2019 NM_{9}	—	July 1, 2019	Haleakala	Pan-STARRS 1	L4	5.6 km	MPC · JPL
679544	2019 NY_{25}	—	July 10, 2019	Mount Lemmon	Mount Lemmon Survey	EUN	900 m	MPC · JPL
679545	2019 NQ_{41}	—	July 1, 2019	Haleakala	Pan-STARRS 1	·	2.7 km	MPC · JPL
679546	2019 NQ_{47}	—	July 1, 2019	Haleakala	Pan-STARRS 1	L4	5.7 km	MPC · JPL
679547	2019 NA_{48}	—	July 1, 2019	Haleakala	Pan-STARRS 1	L4	6.1 km	MPC · JPL
679548	2019 NK_{48}	—	July 1, 2019	Haleakala	Pan-STARRS 1	L4	7.5 km	MPC · JPL
679549	2019 NM_{58}	—	April 18, 2015	Cerro Tololo-DECam	DECam	L4	7.3 km	MPC · JPL
679550	2019 NZ_{59}	—	July 6, 2019	Haleakala	Pan-STARRS 1	L4	7.3 km	MPC · JPL
679551	2019 OS_{5}	—	August 11, 2015	Haleakala	Pan-STARRS 1	·	1.2 km	MPC · JPL
679552 Efspringer	2019 OV_{5}	Efspringer	October 31, 2013	Piszkéstető	M. Langbroek, K. Sárneczky	·	610 m	MPC · JPL
679553	2019 OE_{6}	—	September 19, 2003	Kitt Peak	Spacewatch	·	2.9 km	MPC · JPL
679554	2019 OK_{11}	—	December 26, 2013	Haleakala	Pan-STARRS 1	·	940 m	MPC · JPL
679555	2019 OE_{16}	—	July 30, 2019	Palomar	Zwicky Transient Facility	·	2.5 km	MPC · JPL
679556	2019 OC_{23}	—	January 29, 2017	Haleakala	Pan-STARRS 1	·	3.0 km	MPC · JPL
679557	2019 OZ_{25}	—	September 21, 2009	Mount Lemmon	Mount Lemmon Survey	L4	6.3 km	MPC · JPL
679558	2019 OM_{26}	—	July 25, 2019	Haleakala	Pan-STARRS 1	L4	6.6 km	MPC · JPL
679559	2019 OP_{26}	—	April 17, 2015	Cerro Tololo-DECam	DECam	L4	6.8 km	MPC · JPL
679560	2019 ON_{27}	—	July 28, 2019	Haleakala	Pan-STARRS 2	L4	6.5 km	MPC · JPL
679561	2019 OZ_{27}	—	April 18, 2015	Cerro Tololo-DECam	DECam	L4	8.0 km	MPC · JPL
679562	2019 OC_{32}	—	July 26, 2019	Haleakala	Pan-STARRS 1	L4	5.5 km	MPC · JPL
679563	2019 PH_{6}	—	January 26, 2012	Haleakala	Pan-STARRS 1	·	1.9 km	MPC · JPL
679564	2019 PQ_{6}	—	October 23, 2006	Kitt Peak	Spacewatch	HOF	2.0 km	MPC · JPL
679565	2019 PR_{7}	—	January 2, 2017	Haleakala	Pan-STARRS 1	WAT	1.2 km	MPC · JPL
679566	2019 PF_{11}	—	January 28, 2011	Mount Lemmon	Mount Lemmon Survey	EOS	1.8 km	MPC · JPL
679567	2019 PN_{11}	—	September 22, 2008	Mount Lemmon	Mount Lemmon Survey	VER	2.7 km	MPC · JPL
679568	2019 PV_{44}	—	August 8, 2019	Haleakala	Pan-STARRS 2	L4	6.8 km	MPC · JPL
679569	2019 PK_{51}	—	August 8, 2019	Haleakala	Pan-STARRS 1	L4	6.4 km	MPC · JPL
679570	2019 PL_{51}	—	October 13, 2010	Mount Lemmon	Mount Lemmon Survey	L4	5.1 km	MPC · JPL
679571	2019 QG_{3}	—	April 9, 2013	XuYi	PMO NEO Survey Program	·	4.0 km	MPC · JPL
679572	2019 QM_{8}	—	March 31, 2015	Haleakala	Pan-STARRS 1	L4	8.4 km	MPC · JPL
679573	2019 QZ_{10}	—	January 19, 2013	Mount Lemmon	Mount Lemmon Survey	·	1.7 km	MPC · JPL
679574	2019 QV_{11}	—	January 10, 2008	Mount Lemmon	Mount Lemmon Survey	·	1.5 km	MPC · JPL
679575	2019 QC_{13}	—	August 24, 2019	Haleakala	Pan-STARRS 1	T_{j} (2.94) · 3:2	3.9 km	MPC · JPL
679576	2019 QN_{13}	—	August 27, 2019	Mount Lemmon	Mount Lemmon Survey	EUN	900 m	MPC · JPL
679577	2019 QY_{13}	—	October 10, 2015	Haleakala	Pan-STARRS 1	·	1.1 km	MPC · JPL
679578	2019 QZ_{36}	—	March 20, 2017	Haleakala	Pan-STARRS 1	(5)	810 m	MPC · JPL
679579	2019 QT_{40}	—	August 27, 2019	Mount Lemmon	Mount Lemmon Survey	L4	8.3 km	MPC · JPL
679580	2019 QU_{40}	—	October 1, 2005	Mount Lemmon	Mount Lemmon Survey	·	560 m	MPC · JPL
679581	2019 QJ_{54}	—	April 18, 2015	Cerro Tololo	DECam	·	820 m	MPC · JPL
679582	2019 QP_{57}	—	August 28, 2019	Haleakala	Pan-STARRS 1	L4	5.0 km	MPC · JPL
679583	2019 QS_{74}	—	August 29, 2019	Haleakala	Pan-STARRS 1	L4	4.8 km	MPC · JPL
679584	2019 QG_{77}	—	February 1, 2017	Mount Lemmon	Mount Lemmon Survey	·	1.8 km	MPC · JPL
679585	2019 RF_{3}	—	October 20, 2011	Haleakala	Pan-STARRS 1	·	1.3 km	MPC · JPL
679586	2019 RU_{5}	—	August 29, 2002	Palomar	NEAT	·	480 m	MPC · JPL
679587	2019 RL_{11}	—	December 3, 2005	Mauna Kea	A. Boattini	(31811)	2.8 km	MPC · JPL
679588	2019 RG_{14}	—	May 10, 2013	Kitt Peak	Spacewatch	HNS	1.1 km	MPC · JPL
679589	2019 RT_{28}	—	May 20, 2015	Cerro Tololo-DECam	DECam	L4	5.9 km	MPC · JPL
679590	2019 RX_{29}	—	June 11, 2015	Haleakala	Pan-STARRS 1	·	460 m	MPC · JPL
679591	2019 RD_{30}	—	September 4, 2019	Mount Lemmon	Mount Lemmon Survey	PHO	840 m	MPC · JPL
679592	2019 RJ_{32}	—	September 6, 2019	Haleakala	Pan-STARRS 1	·	1.0 km	MPC · JPL
679593	2019 RQ_{32}	—	August 27, 2019	Palomar	Zwicky Transient Facility	EUN	810 m	MPC · JPL
679594	2019 RR_{67}	—	September 6, 2019	Haleakala	Pan-STARRS 1	L4	4.8 km	MPC · JPL
679595	2019 SJ_{14}	—	March 5, 2017	Haleakala	Pan-STARRS 1	·	890 m	MPC · JPL
679596	2019 SP_{15}	—	September 28, 2019	Mount Lemmon	Mount Lemmon Survey	·	850 m	MPC · JPL
679597	2019 ST_{25}	—	September 22, 2019	Mount Lemmon	Mount Lemmon Survey	·	610 m	MPC · JPL
679598	2019 SZ_{27}	—	September 30, 2019	Mount Lemmon	Mount Lemmon Survey	·	510 m	MPC · JPL
679599	2019 SD_{40}	—	October 21, 2008	Kitt Peak	Spacewatch	·	2.4 km	MPC · JPL
679600	2019 SK_{49}	—	October 6, 2008	Catalina	CSS	·	2.5 km	MPC · JPL

== 679601–679700 ==
back to top

Designation			Discovery			Properties		Ref
Permanent	Provisional	Named after	Date	Site	Discoverer(s)	Category	Diam.	Ref
679601	2019 SO_{51}	—	September 28, 2019	Mount Lemmon	Mount Lemmon Survey	·	1.1 km	MPC · JPL
679602	2019 SH_{74}	—	January 1, 2017	Oukaïmeden	C. Rinner	·	480 m	MPC · JPL
679603	2019 SU_{83}	—	September 22, 2019	Mount Lemmon	Mount Lemmon Survey	·	680 m	MPC · JPL
679604	2019 SM_{84}	—	September 29, 2019	Haleakala	Pan-STARRS 1	·	630 m	MPC · JPL
679605	2019 SN_{84}	—	September 25, 2019	Haleakala	Pan-STARRS 1	·	590 m	MPC · JPL
679606	2019 SV_{84}	—	September 26, 2019	Haleakala	Pan-STARRS 1	·	530 m	MPC · JPL
679607	2019 SJ_{85}	—	September 22, 2019	Mount Lemmon	Mount Lemmon Survey	·	510 m	MPC · JPL
679608	2019 SH_{87}	—	September 29, 2019	Haleakala	Pan-STARRS 1	·	580 m	MPC · JPL
679609	2019 SY_{87}	—	September 30, 2019	Haleakala	Pan-STARRS 1	TRE	1.8 km	MPC · JPL
679610	2019 SE_{110}	—	September 28, 2019	Mount Lemmon	Mount Lemmon Survey	·	760 m	MPC · JPL
679611	2019 SR_{116}	—	September 30, 2019	Mount Lemmon	Mount Lemmon Survey	·	720 m	MPC · JPL
679612	2019 SY_{140}	—	September 29, 2019	Haleakala	Pan-STARRS 1	·	640 m	MPC · JPL
679613	2019 SN_{173}	—	April 17, 2015	Cerro Tololo-DECam	DECam	·	550 m	MPC · JPL
679614	2019 TW_{4}	—	April 2, 2013	Mount Lemmon	Mount Lemmon Survey	H	400 m	MPC · JPL
679615	2019 TB_{11}	—	June 15, 2015	Mount Lemmon	Mount Lemmon Survey	PHO	710 m	MPC · JPL
679616	2019 TL_{15}	—	December 15, 2007	Kitt Peak	Spacewatch	·	1.2 km	MPC · JPL
679617	2019 TK_{24}	—	September 24, 2019	Haleakala	Pan-STARRS 1	·	980 m	MPC · JPL
679618	2019 TW_{33}	—	October 1, 2019	Palomar	Zwicky Transient Facility	·	630 m	MPC · JPL
679619	2019 TF_{40}	—	April 18, 2015	Cerro Tololo-DECam	DECam	·	440 m	MPC · JPL
679620	2019 TJ_{45}	—	October 7, 2019	Mount Lemmon	Mount Lemmon Survey	·	1.1 km	MPC · JPL
679621	2019 TO_{75}	—	October 8, 2019	Haleakala	Pan-STARRS 1	V	370 m	MPC · JPL
679622	2019 TU_{87}	—	October 9, 2019	Haleakala	Pan-STARRS 1	·	1.0 km	MPC · JPL
679623	2019 UD_{9}	—	October 5, 2014	Haleakala	Pan-STARRS 1	H	480 m	MPC · JPL
679624	2019 UO_{12}	—	August 28, 2014	Haleakala	Pan-STARRS 1	BAR	1.0 km	MPC · JPL
679625	2019 UO_{15}	—	May 30, 2011	Haleakala	Pan-STARRS 1	·	1.2 km	MPC · JPL
679626	2019 UO_{20}	—	October 21, 2006	Mount Lemmon	Mount Lemmon Survey	·	1.2 km	MPC · JPL
679627	2019 UD_{25}	—	November 12, 2015	Mount Lemmon	Mount Lemmon Survey	·	930 m	MPC · JPL
679628	2019 UB_{27}	—	May 24, 2014	Haleakala	Pan-STARRS 1	·	850 m	MPC · JPL
679629	2019 UT_{32}	—	October 23, 2019	Haleakala	Pan-STARRS 1	·	540 m	MPC · JPL
679630	2019 UH_{36}	—	October 24, 2019	Mount Lemmon	Mount Lemmon Survey	·	580 m	MPC · JPL
679631	2019 UY_{37}	—	October 24, 2019	Mount Lemmon	Mount Lemmon Survey	·	1.2 km	MPC · JPL
679632	2019 UQ_{38}	—	October 25, 2019	Mount Lemmon	Mount Lemmon Survey	·	1.5 km	MPC · JPL
679633	2019 UZ_{42}	—	September 6, 2015	Kitt Peak	Spacewatch	V	410 m	MPC · JPL
679634	2019 UA_{65}	—	October 23, 2019	Haleakala	Pan-STARRS 1	·	660 m	MPC · JPL
679635	2019 UD_{105}	—	October 24, 2019	Mount Lemmon	Mount Lemmon Survey	·	560 m	MPC · JPL
679636	2019 UT_{169}	—	October 31, 2019	Haleakala	Pan-STARRS 2	NYS	680 m	MPC · JPL
679637	2019 VX_{6}	—	October 23, 2019	Haleakala	Pan-STARRS 1	·	860 m	MPC · JPL
679638	2019 VG_{8}	—	April 3, 2016	Haleakala	Pan-STARRS 1	·	1.1 km	MPC · JPL
679639	2019 VX_{9}	—	November 9, 2019	Haleakala	Pan-STARRS 2	·	1.0 km	MPC · JPL
679640	2019 VR_{29}	—	November 2, 2019	Haleakala	Pan-STARRS 1	·	720 m	MPC · JPL
679641	2019 VS_{34}	—	April 23, 2014	Cerro Tololo-DECam	DECam	·	360 m	MPC · JPL
679642	2019 VR_{39}	—	November 2, 2019	Mount Lemmon	Mount Lemmon Survey	·	1.1 km	MPC · JPL
679643	2019 WY_{2}	—	January 19, 2017	Mount Lemmon	Mount Lemmon Survey	PHO	690 m	MPC · JPL
679644	2019 WA_{7}	—	June 19, 2015	Mount Lemmon	Mount Lemmon Survey	·	630 m	MPC · JPL
679645	2019 WY_{7}	—	November 24, 2019	Mount Lemmon	Mount Lemmon Survey	·	840 m	MPC · JPL
679646	2019 WA_{15}	—	April 23, 2014	Cerro Tololo	DECam	·	590 m	MPC · JPL
679647	2019 WD_{16}	—	November 19, 2019	Mount Lemmon	Mount Lemmon Survey	·	1.1 km	MPC · JPL
679648	2019 XS	—	December 2, 2019	Mount Lemmon	Mount Lemmon Survey	APO	60 m	MPC · JPL
679649	2019 XZ_{7}	—	December 21, 2014	Haleakala	Pan-STARRS 1	·	2.1 km	MPC · JPL
679650	2019 YZ_{12}	—	November 17, 2014	Haleakala	Pan-STARRS 1	·	1.5 km	MPC · JPL
679651	2020 AJ_{4}	—	March 15, 2016	Haleakala	Pan-STARRS 1	·	1.4 km	MPC · JPL
679652	2020 AQ_{6}	—	January 4, 2020	Mount Lemmon	Mount Lemmon Survey	·	1.1 km	MPC · JPL
679653	2020 BN_{4}	—	August 12, 2019	Haleakala	Pan-STARRS 1	PHO	720 m	MPC · JPL
679654	2020 BV_{11}	—	October 29, 2010	Kitt Peak	Spacewatch	·	1.4 km	MPC · JPL
679655	2020 BS_{12}	—	January 23, 2020	Haleakala	Pan-STARRS 1	APO · PHA	340 m	MPC · JPL
679656	2020 BP_{13}	—	January 28, 2020	Mount Lemmon	Mount Lemmon Survey	AMO · APO · PHA	220 m	MPC · JPL
679657	2020 BE_{15}	—	January 29, 2020	Mount Lemmon	Mount Lemmon Survey	APO	350 m	MPC · JPL
679658	2020 BX_{21}	—	November 19, 2009	Kitt Peak	Spacewatch	·	1.8 km	MPC · JPL
679659	2020 BT_{25}	—	December 24, 2016	Haleakala	Pan-STARRS 1	H	450 m	MPC · JPL
679660	2020 BY_{43}	—	January 20, 2020	Haleakala	Pan-STARRS 1	·	1.2 km	MPC · JPL
679661	2020 BX_{60}	—	April 2, 2016	Haleakala	Pan-STARRS 1	EUN	750 m	MPC · JPL
679662	2020 BT_{63}	—	January 21, 2020	Haleakala	Pan-STARRS 1	·	990 m	MPC · JPL
679663	2020 BW_{75}	—	January 20, 2020	Haleakala	Pan-STARRS 1	·	1.3 km	MPC · JPL
679664	2020 BR_{90}	—	May 27, 2012	Siding Spring	SSS	BAR	1.1 km	MPC · JPL
679665	2020 BA_{92}	—	January 24, 2020	Mount Lemmon	Mount Lemmon Survey	·	820 m	MPC · JPL
679666	2020 CA_{4}	—	February 5, 2020	Haleakala	Pan-STARRS 1	BAR	950 m	MPC · JPL
679667	2020 CW_{4}	—	February 5, 2020	Haleakala	Pan-STARRS 2	JUN	850 m	MPC · JPL
679668	2020 CX_{5}	—	March 12, 2016	Haleakala	Pan-STARRS 1	HNS	700 m	MPC · JPL
679669	2020 DX_{6}	—	May 7, 2016	Haleakala	Pan-STARRS 1	·	1.6 km	MPC · JPL
679670	2020 DC_{13}	—	March 29, 2016	Cerro Tololo-DECam	DECam	·	930 m	MPC · JPL
679671	2020 DD_{17}	—	February 1, 2011	Piszkés-tető	K. Sárneczky, Z. Kuli	HNS	730 m	MPC · JPL
679672	2020 DJ_{17}	—	February 21, 2020	Cerro Tololo-DECam	DECam	·	1.7 km	MPC · JPL
679673	2020 FU_{8}	—	April 12, 2016	Haleakala	Pan-STARRS 1	·	860 m	MPC · JPL
679674	2020 FW_{10}	—	March 22, 2020	Haleakala	Pan-STARRS 2	·	1.2 km	MPC · JPL
679675	2020 FW_{11}	—	March 19, 2020	XuYi	PMO NEO Survey Program	JUN	740 m	MPC · JPL
679676	2020 FL_{12}	—	March 21, 2020	Haleakala	Pan-STARRS 1	·	1 km	MPC · JPL
679677	2020 FS_{12}	—	January 30, 2011	Haleakala	Pan-STARRS 1	(5)	740 m	MPC · JPL
679678	2020 FY_{13}	—	November 3, 2008	Catalina	CSS	·	1.6 km	MPC · JPL
679679	2020 FH_{14}	—	March 29, 2020	Haleakala	Pan-STARRS 1	·	1.1 km	MPC · JPL
679680	2020 FO_{14}	—	August 8, 2012	Haleakala	Pan-STARRS 1	·	1.1 km	MPC · JPL
679681	2020 FV_{14}	—	March 17, 2016	Haleakala	Pan-STARRS 1	EUN	910 m	MPC · JPL
679682	2020 FP_{19}	—	January 28, 2015	Haleakala	Pan-STARRS 1	EUN	830 m	MPC · JPL
679683	2020 FQ_{19}	—	February 9, 2015	Mount Lemmon	Mount Lemmon Survey	·	1.6 km	MPC · JPL
679684	2020 FO_{25}	—	February 18, 2017	Haleakala	Pan-STARRS 1	H	420 m	MPC · JPL
679685	2020 FB_{38}	—	March 24, 2020	Mount Lemmon	Mount Lemmon Survey	H	360 m	MPC · JPL
679686	2020 GB_{4}	—	April 2, 2020	Haleakala	Pan-STARRS 2	·	1.5 km	MPC · JPL
679687	2020 GS_{4}	—	April 2, 2020	Mount Lemmon	Mount Lemmon Survey	·	1.1 km	MPC · JPL
679688	2020 GC_{5}	—	February 20, 2015	Mount Lemmon	Mount Lemmon Survey	·	1.4 km	MPC · JPL
679689	2020 GS_{5}	—	November 21, 2017	Haleakala	Pan-STARRS 1	·	1.2 km	MPC · JPL
679690	2020 GX_{5}	—	April 22, 2007	Mount Lemmon	Mount Lemmon Survey	·	1.5 km	MPC · JPL
679691	2020 GJ_{6}	—	September 26, 2017	Haleakala	Pan-STARRS 1	EUN	900 m	MPC · JPL
679692	2020 GL_{7}	—	April 2, 2011	Mount Lemmon	Mount Lemmon Survey	·	1.2 km	MPC · JPL
679693	2020 GC_{8}	—	August 3, 2008	Siding Spring	SSS	·	1.3 km	MPC · JPL
679694	2020 GD_{8}	—	April 2, 2020	Haleakala	Pan-STARRS 1	·	1.4 km	MPC · JPL
679695	2020 GM_{13}	—	February 16, 2015	Haleakala	Pan-STARRS 1	HOF	2.0 km	MPC · JPL
679696	2020 GF_{21}	—	April 15, 2020	Haleakala	Pan-STARRS 1	·	1.5 km	MPC · JPL
679697	2020 GY_{23}	—	April 2, 2020	Mount Lemmon	Mount Lemmon Survey	·	1.4 km	MPC · JPL
679698	2020 GA_{27}	—	April 15, 2020	Mount Lemmon	Mount Lemmon Survey	·	1.4 km	MPC · JPL
679699	2020 HF_{11}	—	April 16, 2020	Haleakala	Pan-STARRS 2	·	1.4 km	MPC · JPL
679700	2020 HO_{11}	—	April 20, 2020	Haleakala	Pan-STARRS 1	·	1.3 km	MPC · JPL

== 679701–679800 ==
back to top

Designation			Discovery			Properties		Ref
Permanent	Provisional	Named after	Date	Site	Discoverer(s)	Category	Diam.	Ref
679701	2020 HT_{11}	—	March 29, 2015	Haleakala	Pan-STARRS 1	(16286)	1.5 km	MPC · JPL
679702	2020 HV_{11}	—	April 16, 2020	Mount Lemmon	Mount Lemmon Survey	·	1.4 km	MPC · JPL
679703	2020 HA_{12}	—	April 17, 2020	Haleakala	Pan-STARRS 2	·	1.0 km	MPC · JPL
679704	2020 HD_{13}	—	January 27, 2020	Haleakala	Pan-STARRS 1	JUN	900 m	MPC · JPL
679705	2020 HA_{14}	—	March 14, 2011	Mount Lemmon	Mount Lemmon Survey	·	1.2 km	MPC · JPL
679706	2020 HZ_{17}	—	March 22, 2014	Mount Lemmon	Mount Lemmon Survey	·	1.6 km	MPC · JPL
679707	2020 HL_{18}	—	April 28, 2020	Haleakala	Pan-STARRS 1	·	860 m	MPC · JPL
679708	2020 HP_{18}	—	November 18, 2008	Kitt Peak	Spacewatch	·	1.3 km	MPC · JPL
679709	2020 HU_{18}	—	December 14, 2017	Mount Lemmon	Mount Lemmon Survey	·	1.0 km	MPC · JPL
679710	2020 HX_{18}	—	January 9, 2019	Haleakala	Pan-STARRS 1	·	1.2 km	MPC · JPL
679711	2020 HM_{20}	—	October 31, 2011	Charleston	R. Holmes	·	2.1 km	MPC · JPL
679712	2020 HW_{21}	—	August 5, 2012	Haleakala	Pan-STARRS 1	·	1.2 km	MPC · JPL
679713	2020 HQ_{22}	—	May 14, 2009	Mount Lemmon	Mount Lemmon Survey	·	2.3 km	MPC · JPL
679714	2020 HH_{23}	—	October 29, 2016	Mount Lemmon	Mount Lemmon Survey	·	2.4 km	MPC · JPL
679715	2020 HO_{23}	—	September 25, 2016	Haleakala	Pan-STARRS 1	·	2.3 km	MPC · JPL
679716	2020 HY_{23}	—	October 23, 2011	Haleakala	Pan-STARRS 1	·	1.9 km	MPC · JPL
679717	2020 HF_{24}	—	April 20, 2020	Haleakala	Pan-STARRS 1	·	970 m	MPC · JPL
679718	2020 HK_{26}	—	August 29, 2005	Kitt Peak	Spacewatch	·	1.8 km	MPC · JPL
679719	2020 HQ_{26}	—	May 15, 2012	Haleakala	Pan-STARRS 1	·	990 m	MPC · JPL
679720	2020 HY_{26}	—	September 5, 2016	Mount Lemmon	Mount Lemmon Survey	·	2.0 km	MPC · JPL
679721	2020 HY_{27}	—	February 16, 2015	Haleakala	Pan-STARRS 1	·	1.3 km	MPC · JPL
679722	2020 HL_{30}	—	April 6, 2011	Kitt Peak	Spacewatch	·	1.4 km	MPC · JPL
679723	2020 HY_{30}	—	April 28, 2020	Haleakala	Pan-STARRS 1	·	1.6 km	MPC · JPL
679724	2020 HT_{32}	—	March 23, 2003	Kitt Peak	Spacewatch	·	1.1 km	MPC · JPL
679725	2020 HN_{33}	—	November 6, 2008	Mount Lemmon	Mount Lemmon Survey	·	2.0 km	MPC · JPL
679726	2020 HY_{35}	—	June 29, 2016	Haleakala	Pan-STARRS 1	·	1.2 km	MPC · JPL
679727	2020 HG_{36}	—	October 25, 2012	Mount Lemmon	Mount Lemmon Survey	GEF	1.1 km	MPC · JPL
679728	2020 HJ_{40}	—	April 16, 2020	Mount Lemmon	Mount Lemmon Survey	·	1.4 km	MPC · JPL
679729	2020 HE_{44}	—	January 14, 2015	Haleakala	Pan-STARRS 1	MIS	1.6 km	MPC · JPL
679730	2020 HW_{46}	—	April 16, 2020	Haleakala	Pan-STARRS 2	·	1.3 km	MPC · JPL
679731	2020 HZ_{47}	—	April 18, 2020	Haleakala	Pan-STARRS 1	·	1.4 km	MPC · JPL
679732	2020 HO_{50}	—	July 26, 2016	Kitt Peak	Spacewatch	·	1.5 km	MPC · JPL
679733	2020 HN_{52}	—	May 13, 2015	Haleakala	Pan-STARRS 1	·	1.5 km	MPC · JPL
679734	2020 HF_{54}	—	October 22, 2008	Kitt Peak	Spacewatch	·	1.3 km	MPC · JPL
679735	2020 HK_{57}	—	February 2, 2008	Mount Lemmon	Mount Lemmon Survey	·	2.0 km	MPC · JPL
679736	2020 HQ_{65}	—	April 19, 2020	Mount Lemmon	Mount Lemmon Survey	·	2.4 km	MPC · JPL
679737	2020 HW_{69}	—	April 19, 2020	Haleakala	Pan-STARRS 1	AST	1.2 km	MPC · JPL
679738	2020 HN_{82}	—	October 25, 2013	Mount Lemmon	Mount Lemmon Survey	(5)	1.2 km	MPC · JPL
679739	2020 HD_{94}	—	April 21, 2020	Haleakala	Pan-STARRS 1	·	1.8 km	MPC · JPL
679740	2020 HO_{99}	—	April 20, 2015	Haleakala	Pan-STARRS 1	KOR	1.2 km	MPC · JPL
679741	2020 HV_{115}	—	September 29, 2009	Mount Lemmon	Mount Lemmon Survey	·	1.0 km	MPC · JPL
679742	2020 HZ_{117}	—	April 20, 2020	Haleakala	Pan-STARRS 1	·	1.1 km	MPC · JPL
679743	2020 HU_{118}	—	April 16, 2020	Mount Lemmon	Mount Lemmon Survey	·	1.3 km	MPC · JPL
679744	2020 HS_{119}	—	April 21, 2020	Haleakala	Pan-STARRS 1	·	830 m	MPC · JPL
679745	2020 JQ	—	January 6, 2006	Mount Lemmon	Mount Lemmon Survey	T_{j} (2.94)	4.4 km	MPC · JPL
679746	2020 JL_{4}	—	September 22, 2008	Kitt Peak	Spacewatch	·	1.1 km	MPC · JPL
679747	2020 JG_{8}	—	September 13, 2004	Palomar	NEAT	·	2.4 km	MPC · JPL
679748	2020 JL_{9}	—	May 14, 2020	Mount Lemmon	Mount Lemmon Survey	EUN	980 m	MPC · JPL
679749	2020 JK_{12}	—	January 11, 2019	Haleakala	Pan-STARRS 1	·	2.4 km	MPC · JPL
679750	2020 JJ_{15}	—	March 5, 2014	ESA OGS	ESA OGS	·	2.6 km	MPC · JPL
679751	2020 JT_{15}	—	May 14, 2020	Mount Lemmon	Mount Lemmon Survey	·	2.7 km	MPC · JPL
679752	2020 JT_{16}	—	October 29, 2010	Catalina	CSS	TIR	2.2 km	MPC · JPL
679753	2020 JH_{27}	—	April 23, 2014	Cerro Tololo	DECam	·	2.4 km	MPC · JPL
679754	2020 JT_{28}	—	May 15, 2020	Haleakala	Pan-STARRS 1	EUN	960 m	MPC · JPL
679755	2020 JQ_{30}	—	November 28, 2013	Mount Lemmon	Mount Lemmon Survey	·	930 m	MPC · JPL
679756	2020 KP_{1}	—	May 19, 2020	Haleakala	Pan-STARRS 2	AMO	80 m	MPC · JPL
679757	2020 KW_{7}	—	May 30, 2020	Haleakala	Pan-STARRS 1	APO	360 m	MPC · JPL
679758	2020 KO_{8}	—	October 20, 2016	Mount Lemmon	Mount Lemmon Survey	·	2.3 km	MPC · JPL
679759	2020 KZ_{10}	—	May 24, 2020	Haleakala	Pan-STARRS 2	·	2.4 km	MPC · JPL
679760	2020 KL_{14}	—	May 20, 2020	Haleakala	Pan-STARRS 2	·	1.9 km	MPC · JPL
679761	2020 KO_{15}	—	December 23, 2012	Haleakala	Pan-STARRS 1	·	1.6 km	MPC · JPL
679762	2020 KO_{16}	—	June 24, 2015	Haleakala	Pan-STARRS 1	·	2.5 km	MPC · JPL
679763	2020 KZ_{17}	—	May 28, 2020	Haleakala	Pan-STARRS 1	·	2.4 km	MPC · JPL
679764	2020 KU_{24}	—	May 16, 2010	WISE	WISE	EOS	1.6 km	MPC · JPL
679765	2020 KT_{27}	—	October 24, 2011	Haleakala	Pan-STARRS 1	·	2.0 km	MPC · JPL
679766	2020 KN_{51}	—	April 23, 2014	Cerro Tololo-DECam	DECam	EOS	1.3 km	MPC · JPL
679767	2020 LE_{10}	—	June 14, 2020	Haleakala	Pan-STARRS 1	·	1.6 km	MPC · JPL
679768	2020 LK_{12}	—	June 15, 2020	Haleakala	Pan-STARRS 1	LIX	2.8 km	MPC · JPL
679769	2020 MN_{6}	—	January 2, 2019	Haleakala	Pan-STARRS 1	EUP	2.6 km	MPC · JPL
679770	2020 ME_{40}	—	June 17, 2020	Haleakala	Pan-STARRS 1	·	3.3 km	MPC · JPL
679771	2020 MY_{40}	—	June 20, 2020	Pleasant Groves	Holbrook, M.	·	1.9 km	MPC · JPL
679772	2020 OA_{10}	—	January 2, 2016	Haleakala	Pan-STARRS 1	H	450 m	MPC · JPL
679773	2020 OL_{10}	—	November 4, 2015	MARGO, Nauchnyi	G. Borisov	H	370 m	MPC · JPL
679774	2020 OA_{12}	—	August 24, 2011	Haleakala	Pan-STARRS 1	EUN	1.2 km	MPC · JPL
679775	2020 OO_{21}	—	May 1, 2016	Cerro Tololo-DECam	DECam	·	470 m	MPC · JPL
679776	2020 OZ_{29}	—	July 25, 2020	Haleakala	Pan-STARRS 2	·	2.6 km	MPC · JPL
679777	2020 OH_{30}	—	July 31, 2020	Mount Lemmon	Mount Lemmon Survey	·	1.4 km	MPC · JPL
679778	2020 OJ_{37}	—	July 29, 2020	Haleakala	Pan-STARRS 1	H	280 m	MPC · JPL
679779	2020 OL_{38}	—	April 23, 2014	Cerro Tololo	DECam	AEO	860 m	MPC · JPL
679780	2020 OS_{46}	—	July 26, 2020	Mount Lemmon	Mount Lemmon Survey	·	2.2 km	MPC · JPL
679781	2020 OU_{61}	—	July 30, 2020	Mount Lemmon	Mount Lemmon Survey	·	380 m	MPC · JPL
679782	2020 OT_{81}	—	October 17, 2010	Mount Lemmon	Mount Lemmon Survey	L4	7.5 km	MPC · JPL
679783	2020 OS_{102}	—	October 8, 2015	Haleakala	Pan-STARRS 1	·	2.3 km	MPC · JPL
679784	2020 PU_{7}	—	October 6, 2012	Haleakala	Pan-STARRS 1	H	450 m	MPC · JPL
679785	2020 PK_{8}	—	November 18, 2016	Mount Lemmon	Mount Lemmon Survey	·	1.6 km	MPC · JPL
679786	2020 QG_{3}	—	August 18, 2020	Haleakala	Pan-STARRS 1	APO · PHA	200 m	MPC · JPL
679787	2020 QR_{9}	—	August 21, 2012	Haleakala	Pan-STARRS 1	·	1.1 km	MPC · JPL
679788	2020 QM_{10}	—	December 25, 2005	Kitt Peak	Spacewatch	EOS	2.0 km	MPC · JPL
679789	2020 QA_{11}	—	August 17, 2020	Haleakala	Pan-STARRS 2	BAR	970 m	MPC · JPL
679790	2020 QW_{13}	—	August 22, 2020	Haleakala	Pan-STARRS 1	·	1.7 km	MPC · JPL
679791	2020 QM_{27}	—	August 22, 2020	Haleakala	Pan-STARRS 1	·	730 m	MPC · JPL
679792	2020 QH_{40}	—	November 8, 2010	Kitt Peak	Spacewatch	L4	6.9 km	MPC · JPL
679793	2020 QL_{42}	—	September 6, 2008	Mount Lemmon	Mount Lemmon Survey	L4	5.3 km	MPC · JPL
679794	2020 QE_{65}	—	September 28, 2009	Mount Lemmon	Mount Lemmon Survey	L4	6.6 km	MPC · JPL
679795	2020 QK_{65}	—	May 14, 2015	Haleakala	Pan-STARRS 2	·	950 m	MPC · JPL
679796	2020 QR_{71}	—	November 11, 2010	Mount Lemmon	Mount Lemmon Survey	L4	6.2 km	MPC · JPL
679797	2020 QA_{84}	—	October 9, 2010	Mount Lemmon	Mount Lemmon Survey	L4	5.3 km	MPC · JPL
679798	2020 RC_{11}	—	September 9, 2020	Haleakala	Pan-STARRS 2	H	410 m	MPC · JPL
679799	2020 RS_{28}	—	November 3, 2010	Mount Lemmon	Mount Lemmon Survey	L4	6.8 km	MPC · JPL
679800	2020 RL_{48}	—	September 15, 2020	Haleakala	Pan-STARRS 1	H	390 m	MPC · JPL

== 679801–679900 ==
back to top

Designation			Discovery			Properties		Ref
Permanent	Provisional	Named after	Date	Site	Discoverer(s)	Category	Diam.	Ref
679801	2020 RS_{88}	—	September 15, 2009	Kitt Peak	Spacewatch	L4	5.7 km	MPC · JPL
679802	2020 RU_{99}	—	June 5, 2016	Haleakala	Pan-STARRS 1	L4	6.8 km	MPC · JPL
679803	2020 RW_{103}	—	September 15, 2009	Kitt Peak	Spacewatch	L4	5.1 km	MPC · JPL
679804	2020 RF_{117}	—	April 18, 2015	Cerro Tololo-DECam	DECam	L4	5.1 km	MPC · JPL
679805	2020 RA_{130}	—	April 18, 2015	Cerro Tololo-DECam	DECam	L4	5.4 km	MPC · JPL
679806	2020 SA_{28}	—	September 17, 2019	Haleakala	Pan-STARRS 1	L4	7.2 km	MPC · JPL
679807	2020 SA_{31}	—	July 26, 2014	Haleakala	Pan-STARRS 1	·	1.7 km	MPC · JPL
679808	2020 SM_{34}	—	June 20, 2014	Haleakala	Pan-STARRS 1	·	1.8 km	MPC · JPL
679809	2020 ST_{34}	—	September 19, 2020	Haleakala	Pan-STARRS 1	EOS	1.2 km	MPC · JPL
679810	2020 SS_{69}	—	March 23, 2015	Kitt Peak	Wasserman, L. H., M. W. Buie	L4	7.6 km	MPC · JPL
679811	2020 SH_{72}	—	September 29, 2020	Haleakala	Pan-STARRS 1	H	420 m	MPC · JPL
679812	2020 SE_{84}	—	April 19, 2015	Cerro Tololo-DECam	DECam	L4	5.9 km	MPC · JPL
679813	2020 SK_{84}	—	February 26, 2014	Haleakala	Pan-STARRS 1	L4	6.2 km	MPC · JPL
679814	2020 TH_{5}	—	October 13, 2020	Haleakala	Pan-STARRS 2	APO · PHA	220 m	MPC · JPL
679815	2020 TN_{12}	—	November 19, 2009	Kitt Peak	Spacewatch	·	2.7 km	MPC · JPL
679816	2020 TJ_{19}	—	September 19, 2017	Haleakala	Pan-STARRS 1	H	440 m	MPC · JPL
679817	2020 TV_{69}	—	October 10, 2020	Haleakala	Pan-STARRS 1	L4	5.9 km	MPC · JPL
679818	2020 TT_{77}	—	April 29, 2015	Cerro Paranal	Altmann, M., Prusti, T.	L4	6.0 km	MPC · JPL
679819	2020 WT_{6}	—	January 25, 2012	Haleakala	Pan-STARRS 1	·	1.9 km	MPC · JPL
679820	2020 YC_{2}	—	July 27, 2011	Haleakala	Pan-STARRS 1	H	400 m	MPC · JPL
679821	2020 YX_{6}	—	December 23, 2020	Haleakala	Pan-STARRS 1	H	420 m	MPC · JPL
679822	2021 AG_{5}	—	December 18, 2020	Mount Lemmon	Mount Lemmon Survey	·	1.1 km	MPC · JPL
679823	2021 AN_{27}	—	January 4, 2021	Haleakala	Pan-STARRS 1	H	400 m	MPC · JPL
679824	2021 CF_{20}	—	February 8, 2021	Haleakala	Pan-STARRS 1	H	310 m	MPC · JPL
679825	2021 CY_{21}	—	September 20, 2014	Haleakala	Pan-STARRS 1	·	1.3 km	MPC · JPL
679826	2021 CD_{23}	—	August 6, 2012	Haleakala	Pan-STARRS 1	EOS	1.9 km	MPC · JPL
679827	2021 DD_{3}	—	March 17, 2004	Kitt Peak	Spacewatch	·	610 m	MPC · JPL
679828	2021 DB_{17}	—	February 16, 2021	Haleakala	Pan-STARRS 1	centaur	30 km	MPC · JPL
679829 Sucellos	2021 EC_{5}	Sucellos	March 14, 2021	MAP, San Pedro de	A. Maury, Attard, G.	AMO	760 m	MPC · JPL
679830	2021 EZ_{5}	—	March 29, 2011	Mount Lemmon	Mount Lemmon Survey	·	530 m	MPC · JPL
679831	2021 EM_{11}	—	March 5, 2006	Kitt Peak	Spacewatch	·	780 m	MPC · JPL
679832	2021 EG_{15}	—	July 31, 2011	Haleakala	Pan-STARRS 1	·	890 m	MPC · JPL
679833	2021 ET_{17}	—	September 9, 2015	Haleakala	Pan-STARRS 1	V	410 m	MPC · JPL
679834	2021 ED_{19}	—	September 30, 2016	Haleakala	Pan-STARRS 1	·	520 m	MPC · JPL
679835	2021 FS_{15}	—	March 23, 2021	Kitt Peak	Bok NEO Survey	·	480 m	MPC · JPL
679836	2021 FB_{29}	—	May 22, 2011	Mount Lemmon	Mount Lemmon Survey	·	560 m	MPC · JPL
679837	2021 GD_{9}	—	April 7, 2021	Haleakala	Pan-STARRS 1	centaur	50 km	MPC · JPL
679838	2021 GQ_{14}	—	March 13, 2016	Haleakala	Pan-STARRS 1	·	1.9 km	MPC · JPL
679839	2021 GQ_{15}	—	April 4, 2021	Mount Lemmon	Mount Lemmon Survey	·	710 m	MPC · JPL
679840	2021 GN_{23}	—	August 30, 2011	Haleakala	Pan-STARRS 1	·	910 m	MPC · JPL
679841	2021 GK_{25}	—	August 12, 2018	Haleakala	Pan-STARRS 1	·	510 m	MPC · JPL
679842	2021 GP_{29}	—	June 14, 2018	Mount Lemmon	Mount Lemmon Survey	PHO	670 m	MPC · JPL
679843	2021 GO_{35}	—	August 26, 2014	Haleakala	Pan-STARRS 1	PHO	790 m	MPC · JPL
679844	2021 GL_{45}	—	April 13, 2021	Haleakala	Pan-STARRS 1	·	980 m	MPC · JPL
679845	2021 GB_{46}	—	October 22, 2003	Kitt Peak	Spacewatch	·	580 m	MPC · JPL
679846	2021 GF_{46}	—	May 23, 2011	Mount Lemmon	Mount Lemmon Survey	·	550 m	MPC · JPL
679847	2021 GX_{49}	—	October 17, 2009	Mount Lemmon	Mount Lemmon Survey	·	1.3 km	MPC · JPL
679848	2021 GD_{50}	—	July 29, 2005	Palomar	NEAT	·	680 m	MPC · JPL
679849	2021 GC_{55}	—	March 12, 2010	Kitt Peak	Spacewatch	·	1.8 km	MPC · JPL
679850	2021 GL_{56}	—	April 10, 2021	Mount Lemmon	Mount Lemmon Survey	·	480 m	MPC · JPL
679851	2021 GY_{65}	—	April 10, 2021	Haleakala	Pan-STARRS 1	(194)	1.2 km	MPC · JPL
679852	2021 GS_{69}	—	April 1, 2017	Haleakala	Pan-STARRS 1	·	810 m	MPC · JPL
679853	2021 GS_{72}	—	August 26, 2012	Haleakala	Pan-STARRS 1	·	530 m	MPC · JPL
679854	2021 GZ_{73}	—	April 8, 2021	Haleakala	Pan-STARRS 1	·	2.1 km	MPC · JPL
679855	2021 GA_{111}	—	April 15, 2021	Haleakala	Pan-STARRS 1	·	1.5 km	MPC · JPL
679856	2021 GN_{132}	—	September 20, 2011	Kitt Peak	Spacewatch	·	910 m	MPC · JPL
679857	2021 HF_{4}	—	November 26, 2014	Haleakala	Pan-STARRS 1	L5	6.5 km	MPC · JPL
679858	2021 HQ_{6}	—	May 19, 2018	Haleakala	Pan-STARRS 1	·	490 m	MPC · JPL
679859	2021 HT_{7}	—	December 4, 2015	Mount Lemmon	Mount Lemmon Survey	·	860 m	MPC · JPL
679860	2021 HG_{9}	—	December 13, 2015	Haleakala	Pan-STARRS 1	·	1.1 km	MPC · JPL
679861	2021 HH_{18}	—	July 11, 2018	Haleakala	Pan-STARRS 1	·	720 m	MPC · JPL
679862	2021 HD_{23}	—	February 10, 2011	Mount Lemmon	Mount Lemmon Survey	·	490 m	MPC · JPL
679863	2021 HP_{29}	—	April 17, 2021	Haleakala	Pan-STARRS 1	·	1.1 km	MPC · JPL
679864	2021 JD_{7}	—	August 19, 2018	Haleakala	Pan-STARRS 1	·	780 m	MPC · JPL
679865	2021 JX_{7}	—	February 18, 2015	Haleakala	Pan-STARRS 1	·	2.1 km	MPC · JPL
679866	2021 JA_{8}	—	April 21, 2012	Mount Lemmon	Mount Lemmon Survey	·	1.4 km	MPC · JPL
679867	2021 JS_{20}	—	February 5, 2016	Haleakala	Pan-STARRS 1	RAF	760 m	MPC · JPL
679868	2021 JQ_{30}	—	November 26, 2014	Haleakala	Pan-STARRS 1	·	1.1 km	MPC · JPL
679869	2021 JU_{34}	—	May 21, 2014	Haleakala	Pan-STARRS 1	·	720 m	MPC · JPL
679870	2021 JJ_{46}	—	November 7, 2012	Haleakala	Pan-STARRS 1	·	460 m	MPC · JPL
679871	2021 JA_{50}	—	July 9, 2011	Haleakala	Pan-STARRS 1	·	650 m	MPC · JPL
679872	2021 JE_{50}	—	April 1, 2014	Mount Lemmon	Mount Lemmon Survey	·	420 m	MPC · JPL
679873	2021 JE_{64}	—	September 17, 2017	Haleakala	Pan-STARRS 1	EOS	1.3 km	MPC · JPL
679874	2021 KY_{15}	—	June 23, 2014	Mount Lemmon	Mount Lemmon Survey	NYS	530 m	MPC · JPL
679875	2021 LL_{11}	—	March 29, 2016	Cerro Tololo-DECam	DECam	·	1.1 km	MPC · JPL
679876	2021 LY_{15}	—	June 4, 2005	Kitt Peak	Spacewatch	·	1.3 km	MPC · JPL
679877	2021 LO_{27}	—	June 14, 2021	Haleakala	Pan-STARRS 1	·	590 m	MPC · JPL
679878	2021 MS_{8}	—	April 28, 2014	Cerro Tololo	DECam	·	2.5 km	MPC · JPL
679879	2021 ML_{10}	—	June 26, 2015	Haleakala	Pan-STARRS 1	·	2.0 km	MPC · JPL
679880	2021 MX_{10}	—	May 26, 2007	Mount Lemmon	Mount Lemmon Survey	·	490 m	MPC · JPL
679881	2021 MK_{15}	—	April 28, 2014	Cerro Tololo-DECam	DECam	·	2.0 km	MPC · JPL
679882	2021 MB_{16}	—	July 14, 2016	Haleakala	Pan-STARRS 1	KOR	1.3 km	MPC · JPL
679883	2021 MR_{17}	—	November 19, 2008	Kitt Peak	Spacewatch	·	1.3 km	MPC · JPL
679884	2021 NL_{3}	—	September 13, 2005	Kitt Peak	Spacewatch	·	2.1 km	MPC · JPL
679885	2021 NQ_{5}	—	July 9, 2021	Haleakala	Pan-STARRS 1	APO · PHA	210 m	MPC · JPL
679886	2021 NK_{9}	—	October 2, 2016	Haleakala	Pan-STARRS 1	EOS	1.6 km	MPC · JPL
679887	2021 NW_{17}	—	September 26, 2016	Haleakala	Pan-STARRS 1	·	2.2 km	MPC · JPL
679888	2021 NW_{28}	—	February 4, 2019	Haleakala	Pan-STARRS 1	EOS	1.4 km	MPC · JPL
679889	2021 NY_{28}	—	November 26, 2014	Mount Lemmon	Mount Lemmon Survey	·	1.2 km	MPC · JPL
679890	2021 NX_{42}	—	November 25, 2016	Mount Lemmon	Mount Lemmon Survey	·	2.6 km	MPC · JPL
679891	2021 NE_{65}	—	February 5, 2018	Mount Lemmon	Mount Lemmon Survey	TIR	2.0 km	MPC · JPL
679892	2021 NV_{66}	—	July 9, 2021	Haleakala	Pan-STARRS 1	·	2.0 km	MPC · JPL
679893	2021 OZ_{1}	—	August 23, 2004	Kitt Peak	Spacewatch	·	560 m	MPC · JPL
679894	2021 OL_{2}	—	July 20, 2021	Haleakala	Pan-STARRS 1	·	1.6 km	MPC · JPL
679895	2021 OM_{6}	—	October 1, 2011	Mount Lemmon	Mount Lemmon Survey	·	1.4 km	MPC · JPL
679896	2021 OA_{8}	—	July 19, 2015	Haleakala	Pan-STARRS 1	·	2.1 km	MPC · JPL
679897	2021 OM_{19}	—	July 29, 2008	Kitt Peak	Spacewatch	EUN	930 m	MPC · JPL
679898	2021 OE_{26}	—	February 13, 2013	La Silla	A. Galád, K. Hornoch	·	2.4 km	MPC · JPL
679899	2021 PO_{4}	—	August 4, 2021	Haleakala	Pan-STARRS 1	EUN	990 m	MPC · JPL
679900	2021 PV_{5}	—	August 30, 2011	Haleakala	Pan-STARRS 1	·	1.3 km	MPC · JPL

== 679901–680000 ==
back to top

Designation			Discovery			Properties		Ref
Permanent	Provisional	Named after	Date	Site	Discoverer(s)	Category	Diam.	Ref
679901	2021 PL_{7}	—	November 28, 2013	Mount Lemmon	Mount Lemmon Survey	·	1.5 km	MPC · JPL
679902	2021 PV_{23}	—	April 28, 2014	Cerro Tololo	DECam	·	2.2 km	MPC · JPL
679903	2021 PD_{34}	—	October 13, 2016	Haleakala	Pan-STARRS 1	·	1.8 km	MPC · JPL
679904	2021 PK_{34}	—	August 28, 2016	Mount Lemmon	Mount Lemmon Survey	·	1.5 km	MPC · JPL
679905	2021 PB_{40}	—	July 19, 2006	Mauna Kea	P. A. Wiegert, D. Subasinghe	·	1.3 km	MPC · JPL
679906	2021 PU_{44}	—	July 13, 2021	Haleakala	Pan-STARRS 1	THB	2.2 km	MPC · JPL
679907	2021 PF_{51}	—	October 13, 2006	Kitt Peak	Spacewatch	NYS	960 m	MPC · JPL
679908	2021 PG_{52}	—	August 11, 2021	Haleakala	Pan-STARRS 1	·	1.5 km	MPC · JPL
679909	2021 PA_{55}	—	August 3, 2021	Haleakala	Pan-STARRS 1	·	560 m	MPC · JPL
679910	2021 PK_{64}	—	April 18, 2015	Cerro Tololo-DECam	DECam	·	1.3 km	MPC · JPL
679911	2021 PS_{76}	—	August 30, 2016	Mount Lemmon	Mount Lemmon Survey	·	1.6 km	MPC · JPL
679912	2021 PA_{96}	—	May 25, 2015	Mount Lemmon	Mount Lemmon Survey	KOR	950 m	MPC · JPL
679913	2021 PK_{121}	—	March 21, 2009	Mount Lemmon	Mount Lemmon Survey	KOR	1.3 km	MPC · JPL
679914	2021 PF_{133}	—	August 12, 2021	Haleakala	Pan-STARRS 1	·	1.1 km	MPC · JPL
679915	2021 PD_{154}	—	May 23, 2014	Haleakala	Pan-STARRS 1	·	1.8 km	MPC · JPL
679916	2021 PE_{154}	—	March 10, 2014	Mount Lemmon	Mount Lemmon Survey	·	1.4 km	MPC · JPL
679917	2021 PW_{174}	—	February 4, 2019	Haleakala	Pan-STARRS 1	·	1.1 km	MPC · JPL
679918	2021 PX_{175}	—	August 3, 2021	Haleakala	Pan-STARRS 1	EOS	1.2 km	MPC · JPL
679919	2021 QD_{9}	—	August 31, 2021	Haleakala	Pan-STARRS 2	·	2.8 km	MPC · JPL
679920	2021 QE_{9}	—	September 7, 2008	Mount Lemmon	Mount Lemmon Survey	·	1.4 km	MPC · JPL
679921	2021 QS_{9}	—	November 17, 2018	Mount Lemmon	Mount Lemmon Survey	·	500 m	MPC · JPL
679922	2021 QZ_{10}	—	May 20, 2015	Cerro Tololo-DECam	DECam	KOR	910 m	MPC · JPL
679923	2021 QX_{39}	—	July 13, 2013	Haleakala	Pan-STARRS 1	NYS	680 m	MPC · JPL
679924	2021 QP_{60}	—	January 16, 2008	Kitt Peak	Spacewatch	·	1.7 km	MPC · JPL
679925	2021 RY_{12}	—	December 15, 2017	Mount Lemmon	Mount Lemmon Survey	(5)	880 m	MPC · JPL
679926	2021 RA_{13}	—	December 31, 2013	Haleakala	Pan-STARRS 1	·	1.0 km	MPC · JPL
679927	2021 RS_{13}	—	November 8, 2013	Mount Lemmon	Mount Lemmon Survey	(5)	1.4 km	MPC · JPL
679928	2021 RH_{16}	—	January 21, 2012	Mayhill-ISON	L. Elenin	·	2.5 km	MPC · JPL
679929	2021 RZ_{19}	—	September 4, 2021	Haleakala	Pan-STARRS 2	(194)	1.1 km	MPC · JPL
679930	2021 RK_{22}	—	November 25, 2016	Mount Lemmon	Mount Lemmon Survey	·	1.7 km	MPC · JPL
679931	2021 RW_{22}	—	December 6, 2013	Haleakala	Pan-STARRS 1	·	940 m	MPC · JPL
679932	2021 RY_{22}	—	September 11, 2010	Siding Spring	SSS	·	2.1 km	MPC · JPL
679933	2021 RH_{23}	—	September 4, 2021	Haleakala	Pan-STARRS 2	T_{j} (2.99)	2.6 km	MPC · JPL
679934	2021 RR_{26}	—	May 21, 2015	Haleakala	Pan-STARRS 1	·	1.6 km	MPC · JPL
679935	2021 RR_{46}	—	September 4, 2021	Haleakala	Pan-STARRS 1	L4	7.2 km	MPC · JPL
679936	2021 RA_{63}	—	May 13, 2016	Haleakala	Pan-STARRS 1	·	1.1 km	MPC · JPL
679937	2021 RE_{63}	—	September 25, 2011	Haleakala	Pan-STARRS 1	·	1.8 km	MPC · JPL
679938	2021 RL_{63}	—	February 14, 2013	Haleakala	Pan-STARRS 1	EOS	1.6 km	MPC · JPL
679939	2021 RK_{64}	—	October 30, 2010	Kitt Peak	Spacewatch	L4	6.4 km	MPC · JPL
679940	2021 RG_{91}	—	October 12, 2010	Mount Lemmon	Mount Lemmon Survey	LIX	2.4 km	MPC · JPL
679941	2021 RX_{98}	—	December 1, 2016	Mount Lemmon	Mount Lemmon Survey	TIR	2.2 km	MPC · JPL
679942	2021 RY_{99}	—	September 10, 2021	Mount Lemmon	Mount Lemmon Survey	·	1.1 km	MPC · JPL
679943	2021 RW_{106}	—	December 31, 2013	Kitt Peak	Spacewatch	·	1.3 km	MPC · JPL
679944	2021 RY_{106}	—	December 28, 2017	Mount Lemmon	Mount Lemmon Survey	·	1.3 km	MPC · JPL
679945	2021 RA_{111}	—	April 18, 2015	Cerro Tololo-DECam	DECam	MIS	1.7 km	MPC · JPL
679946	2021 RV_{111}	—	September 6, 2016	Mount Lemmon	Mount Lemmon Survey	·	1.2 km	MPC · JPL
679947	2021 RF_{114}	—	September 9, 2021	Mount Lemmon	Mount Lemmon Survey	·	1.0 km	MPC · JPL
679948	2021 RK_{114}	—	September 4, 2021	Haleakala	Pan-STARRS 2	·	1.0 km	MPC · JPL
679949	2021 RC_{121}	—	November 26, 2014	Haleakala	Pan-STARRS 1	·	690 m	MPC · JPL
679950	2021 RF_{121}	—	September 30, 2003	Apache Point	SDSS Collaboration	·	1.4 km	MPC · JPL
679951	2021 RO_{124}	—	April 18, 2015	Cerro Tololo-DECam	DECam	·	990 m	MPC · JPL
679952	2021 RT_{205}	—	September 4, 2021	Cerro Tololo-DECam	DECam	·	1.6 km	MPC · JPL
679953	2021 RJ_{206}	—	September 4, 2021	Cerro Tololo-DECam	DECam	·	1.1 km	MPC · JPL
679954	2021 SA_{3}	—	September 23, 2011	Haleakala	Pan-STARRS 1	·	620 m	MPC · JPL
679955	2021 SM_{13}	—	January 1, 2014	Kitt Peak	Spacewatch	·	1.2 km	MPC · JPL
679956	2021 TY_{13}	—	May 20, 2015	Cerro Tololo-DECam	DECam	·	900 m	MPC · JPL
679957	2021 TL_{36}	—	September 10, 2020	Mount Lemmon	Mount Lemmon Survey	L4	5.2 km	MPC · JPL
679958	2021 TT_{42}	—	November 6, 2010	Mount Lemmon	Mount Lemmon Survey	L4	6.0 km	MPC · JPL
679959	2021 TR_{45}	—	January 17, 2013	Mount Lemmon	Mount Lemmon Survey	L4	6.0 km	MPC · JPL
679960	2021 UL_{20}	—	August 28, 2019	Haleakala	Pan-STARRS 1	L4	5.4 km	MPC · JPL
679961	2022 JN	—	April 18, 2013	Siding Spring	SSS	·	1.6 km	MPC · JPL
679962	2022 KY_{25}	—	May 25, 2022	Haleakala	Pan-STARRS 2	T_{j} (2.98)	2.2 km	MPC · JPL
679963	2022 KF_{26}	—	May 26, 2022	Mount Lemmon	Mount Lemmon Survey	·	1.1 km	MPC · JPL
679964	2022 LV_{2}	—	June 1, 2022	Haleakala	Pan-STARRS 2	centaur	100 km	MPC · JPL
679965	2022 LT_{4}	—	January 24, 2014	Haleakala	Pan-STARRS 1	·	2.9 km	MPC · JPL
679966	2022 OP_{18}	—	June 24, 2017	Haleakala	Pan-STARRS 1	·	1.5 km	MPC · JPL
679967	2022 OM_{32}	—	July 28, 2022	Haleakala	Pan-STARRS 2	·	1.7 km	MPC · JPL
679968	2022 OE_{47}	—	January 6, 2015	Haleakala	Pan-STARRS 1	·	1.3 km	MPC · JPL
679969	2022 PQ	—	August 1, 2022	Haleakala	Pan-STARRS 2	AMO	240 m	MPC · JPL
679970	2022 QL_{3}	—	October 26, 2011	Haleakala	Pan-STARRS 1	TIR	2.3 km	MPC · JPL
679971	2022 QM_{16}	—	November 30, 2014	Haleakala	Pan-STARRS 1	·	1.1 km	MPC · JPL
679972	2022 QC_{26}	—	October 3, 2014	Mount Lemmon	Mount Lemmon Survey	EUN	700 m	MPC · JPL
679973	2022 QT_{73}	—	July 8, 2016	Haleakala	Pan-STARRS 1	·	2.6 km	MPC · JPL
679974	2022 QW_{75}	—	September 26, 2011	Mount Lemmon	Mount Lemmon Survey	·	2.3 km	MPC · JPL
679975	2022 QJ_{133}	—	January 26, 2017	Haleakala	Pan-STARRS 1	·	470 m	MPC · JPL
679976	2022 QU_{142}	—	October 31, 2011	Mount Lemmon	Mount Lemmon Survey	·	2.1 km	MPC · JPL
679977	2022 QO_{193}	—	July 25, 2015	Haleakala	Pan-STARRS 1	·	520 m	MPC · JPL
679978	2022 QS_{199}	—	August 31, 2022	Haleakala	Pan-STARRS 1	·	1.1 km	MPC · JPL
679979	2022 RR_{3}	—	December 25, 2010	Mount Lemmon	Mount Lemmon Survey	T_{j} (2.97)	3.0 km	MPC · JPL
679980	2022 RR_{34}	—	October 3, 2013	Haleakala	Pan-STARRS 1	·	980 m	MPC · JPL
679981	2022 SC_{22}	—	November 19, 2018	Haleakala	Pan-STARRS 2	·	1.6 km	MPC · JPL
679982	2022 SG_{27}	—	December 14, 2018	Haleakala	Pan-STARRS 1	·	1.7 km	MPC · JPL
679983	2022 SX_{49}	—	February 17, 2020	Mount Lemmon	Mount Lemmon Survey	·	1.4 km	MPC · JPL
679984	2022 SE_{55}	—	September 20, 2006	Kitt Peak	Spacewatch	·	1.7 km	MPC · JPL
679985	2022 SJ_{55}	—	September 23, 2011	Haleakala	Pan-STARRS 1	·	1.9 km	MPC · JPL
679986	2022 SY_{89}	—	July 15, 2013	Haleakala	Pan-STARRS 1	·	1.2 km	MPC · JPL
679987	2022 SL_{90}	—	September 30, 2011	Kitt Peak	Spacewatch	·	1.9 km	MPC · JPL
679988	2022 SX_{105}	—	April 23, 2014	Cerro Tololo	DECam	·	2.0 km	MPC · JPL
679989	2022 SQ_{124}	—	January 26, 2020	Haleakala	Pan-STARRS 1	·	840 m	MPC · JPL
679990	2022 ST_{152}	—	October 3, 2013	Kitt Peak	Spacewatch	·	1.4 km	MPC · JPL
679991	2022 UZ_{6}	—	August 30, 2013	Haleakala	Pan-STARRS 1	·	1.1 km	MPC · JPL
679992	2022 UO_{62}	—	November 14, 2007	Mount Lemmon	Mount Lemmon Survey	·	1.7 km	MPC · JPL
679993	2022 UQ_{64}	—	March 29, 2012	Kitt Peak	Spacewatch	·	1.1 km	MPC · JPL
679994	2022 UL_{99}	—	October 27, 2022	Kitt Peak	Bok NEO Survey	·	1.6 km	MPC · JPL
679995	2022 YM_{7}	—	December 22, 2022	Kitt Peak	Bok NEO Survey	centaur	40 km	MPC · JPL
679996 Mariyafilippovna	2023 PS_{3}	Mariyafilippovna	August 9, 2023	La Palma-Liverpool	Romanov, F. D.	H	150 m	MPC · JPL
679997	2023 RB	—	September 4, 2023	Haleakala	Pan-STARRS 1	centaur	50 km	MPC · JPL
679998	2023 RX_{33}	—	April 16, 2021	Haleakala	Pan-STARRS 1	·	2.5 km	MPC · JPL
679999 Mariyavarkina	2023 SJ_{76}	Mariyavarkina	September 16, 2023	Beryl Junction	Romanov, F. D.	NYS	350 m	MPC · JPL
680000	2023 WX_{43}	—	April 2, 2019	Haleakala	Pan-STARRS 1	·	1.7 km	MPC · JPL

back to top

== Meaning of names ==
As minor planet discoveries are confirmed, they are given a permanent number by the IAU's Minor Planet Center (MPC), and the discoverers can then submit names for them, following the IAU's naming conventions. The list below concerns those minor planets in the specified number-range that have received names, and explains the meanings of those names.

Official naming citations of newly named small Solar System bodies are approved and published in a bulletin by IAU's Working Group for Small Bodies Nomenclature (WGSBN). Before May 2021, citations were published in MPC's Minor Planet Circulars for many decades. Recent citations can also be found on the JPL Small-Body Database (SBDB). Until his death in 2016, German astronomer Lutz D. Schmadel compiled these citations into the Dictionary of Minor Planet Names (DMP) and regularly updated the collection.

Based on Paul Herget's The Names of the Minor Planets, Schmadel also researched the unclear origin of numerous asteroids, most of which had been named prior to World War II. This article incorporates text from this source, which is in the public domain: SBDB New namings may only be added to this list below after official publication as the preannouncement of names is condemned. The WGSBN publishes a comprehensive guideline for the naming rules of non-cometary small Solar System bodies.

Named minor planet	Provisional	This minor planet was named for...	Ref · Catalog
679211 Gheorghe	2018 VL_{61}	Andrei Dorian Gheorghe, cultural advisor of the Romanian Society for Meteors and Astronomy.	IAU · 679211
679552 Efspringer	2019 OV_{5}	F. Springer was the pseudonym of Dutch novelist and diplomat Carel Jan Schneider (1932–2011).	IAU · 679552
679829 Sucellos	2021 EC_{5}	Sucellos, a Gaulish god, usually represented with a long hammer in one hand and a keg in the other.	IAU · 679829
679996 Mariyafilippovna	2023 PS_{3}	Mariya Filippovna Romanova (1919–1979), a Russian great-grandmother of the discoverer.	IAU · 679996
679999 Mariyavarkina	2023 SJ_{76}	Mariya Maksimovna Varkina (née Kabaeva, 1922–1962), a great-grandmother of the discoverer.	IAU · 679999
