= Teheran, een zwanezang =

1991 novel by F. Springer

- Dutch edition cover
- Author: F. Springer
- Language: Dutch
- Genre: Novel; fictionalized eyewitness account
- Publisher: Querido
- Publication date: 1991
- Publication place: Netherlands
- Media type: Print
- Pages: 285
- Preceded by: Nuchtere nostalgie (1991)
- Followed by: Bandoeng-Bandung (1993)

Teheran, een zwanezang ("Tehran, a Swan Song") is a novel by the Dutch author F. Springer, published in 1991. It is a love story set against the background of the Iranian Revolution.

== Summary ==
Toby Harrison, a Dutch writer of English pulp biographies, accepts an invitation by the Iranian government to write about Reza Shah, the father of the reigning king of Iran, Mohammad. His hosts make sure that he will want for nothing: a nice hotel, a good office, and a capable secretary. Although Harrison hears stories about violence, he is able to work and swiftly finishes his first chapter ("Gustav Mahler in Tabriz"). He meets several people, including a young Iranian who informs him that he can easily arrange a meeting with one of the stewardesses in his hotel (Harrison declines), and several businessmen and journalists, who generally have a low opinion of the Iranians.

Slowly, Harrison starts to believe he understands the country, where rogues and pranksters appear to be successful. This image is based on his own experiences - who could have imagined that a pulp author would be treated like a king? - and the book he is reading, Morier's funny The Adventures of Hajji Baba of Esfahan.

However, he slowly awakens from his delusions, partly because he falls in love with his secretary, Miss Jahanbari, and partly because the Dutch consul, Bill Turfjager, asks him to become his personal assistant. Writing becomes more difficult, although the Shah is personally interested in this project, which must glorify the Pahlavi dynasty.

The situation slowly worsens, although Harrison is capable of ignoring what is going on, even after he's hit by a stone, even after the people at his office no longer turn up, even after he meets the father of Miss Jahanbari, who has had some awful experiences. He starts to live with Turfjager, who has already sent his wife back to the Netherlands and is by now preparing for the evacuation of the Dutch community. There are several accounts of turncoats and other opportunists, confirming Harrison's idea that being a scoundrel is a road to success in Iran.

When the revolution finally gets momentum, Harrison is for the second time invited to the palace, where he meets the king - who is alone, abandoned by all his attendants. Realizing he has to leave Iran, Harrison arranges a ticket for Miss Jahanbari, and arrives at a very chaotic Mehrabad Airport. Just at the moment when he decides that it is impossible to return home, the young Iranian who has offered him the sexual services of the stewardesses turns up. He is now a revolutionary, and praises Mister Harrison, who has shown him the road to better moral conduct. He arranges Harrison's flight to Europe.

Here, Harrison learns that Jahanbari will be in the next plane. With a bunch of roses, he is ready to receive her, but the passenger named Jahanbari turns out to be the father of the woman he loves, who had not known of the affair and is shocked to see the flowers. The book about Reza Shah is never finished, and Toby Harrison is unable to write another book. Tehran had been the pulp writer's swan song.

== Style ==
Springer tells a light-hearted, mildly ironical story with entertaining dialogues. Until the last pages, the novel reads as a picaresque tale, which leaves the reader unprepared for the final scenes, a grim "Postscript" in which it becomes very clear that revolution has little to do with rogues and pranksters. A very brief account of the killing of former prime minister Hoveyda stands out as one of the most shocking scenes.

== Critical reception ==
Springer had received several literary prizes in the years before he published Teheran, een zwanezang, and although the novel received much praise and was quickly reprinted, it received no awards. Still, it is considered to be one of Springer's best novels. After the first edition, the novel has been reprinted six times (as of 2006); the eighth edition is part of Springer's collected works.

Because Springer was one of the Dutch diplomats in Tehran during the Iranian Revolution, it has been interpreted as a fictionalized eyewitness account.

== Literature ==
- Arjen Fortuin, "In de ban van de revolutie. Fictie bij de feiten", in NRC Handelsblad, June 20, 2009.
