= F. Springer =

Dutch novelist, writer and diplomat (1932–2011)

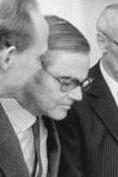
Carel Schneider (Berlin, 1989)

F. Springer (15 January 1932 – 7 November 2011) was the pseudonym of Carel Jan Schneider, a Dutch foreign service diplomat and writer.

Schneider was born in Batavia, Dutch East Indies. He spent World War II in a Japanese internment camp, and subsequently lived and worked in New Guinea, New York, Bangkok, Brussels, Dhaka, Luanda, East Berlin (where he served as the penultimate ambassador), and Tehran all of which have served as locations for the novels and stories which he has published.

His laconic style has been compared to that of F. Scott Fitzgerald or Graham Greene, and he often adopts an ironic perspective on his often tragic subject matter, such as in Teheran, een zwanezang ("Tehran, a swansong"), a love story set against the background of the Iranian Revolution. Especially important in his work are the Dutch East Indies and the concept of (Indonesian: tempo dulu) "Times Gone By", a nostalgia for life in the former Dutch colonies in the East.

For Bougainville he received the Ferdinand Bordewijk award in 1982 and was awarded the Constantijn Huygens Prize for his entire work in 1995. He died in The Hague.

== Partial bibliography ==
- 1962 – Bericht uit Hollandia (stories)
- 1969 – De gladde paal van macht. Een politieke legende (novel)
- 1974 – Tabee, New York (novel)
- 1977 – Zaken overzee (stories)
- 1981 – Bougainville. Een gedenkschrift (novel)
- 1985 – Quissama. Een relaas (novel)
- 1990 – Sterremeer. Een romance (novella)
- 1991 – Teheran, een zwanezang (novel)
- 1993 – Bandoeng-Bandung. Een novelle (novella)
- 1998 – Kandy. Een terugtocht (novel)
- 2001 – Verzameld werk (collected works)
- 2005 – Bangkok, een elegie (novel)
- 2010 – Quadriga (novel)
