= Querido =

Querido can be a masculine given name or a surname. Notable people with the name include:

== Given name ==
- Querido Moheno, former Secretary of Foreign Affairs of Mexico

== Surname ==
- Emanuel Querido, Dutch publisher
- Israël Querido, Dutch novelist
- Jacob Querido, religious leader
