= Vondel Prize =

Literary translation prize

- Sponsored by: Dutch Foundation for Literature (original establishing body)
- Country: Netherlands / United Kingdom
- Presented by: Society of Authors
- Status: Active
- First award: 1996

The Vondel Prize is a literary translation prize for full-length works from the Dutch into English. The prize was established in 1996 by the Foundation for the Production and Translation of Dutch literature, and is named after the 17th-century Dutch writer Joost van den Vondel.

The award is currently presented biennially (every two years). It is administered by The Society of Authors in the UK, in collaboration with the Dutch Foundation for Literature (which was formerly the establishing body). The prize recognizes the best book-length translation from Dutch or Flemish (the variety of Dutch spoken in Belgium) into English, and generally carries a value of £5,000 (GBP). The prize is considered one of the most prestigious translation awards dedicated to Dutch literature in the English-speaking world.

== Winners ==
=== 2024 ===
- Winner: Kristen Gehrman for a translation of The History of My Sexuality by Tobi Lakmaker (Granta Books)
- Runner-up: David McKay for a translation of We Slaves of Suriname by Anton de Kom (Polity Press)

Shortlisted:

- Emma Rault for a translation of We Had to Remove This Post by Hanna Bervoets (Picador)
- Michele Hutchison for a translation of My Heavenly Favourite by Lucas Rijneveld (Faber)
- Sam Garrett for a translation of Falling is like Flying by Manon Uphoff (Pushkin Press)

=== 2021 ===
- Winner: David Doherty for a translation of Summer Brother by Jaap Robben (World Editions)
- Runner-up: David McKay for a translation of Adrift in the Middle Kingdom by J. Slauerhoff (Handheld Press)

Shortlisted:

- David Colmer for a translation of Will by Jeroen Olyslaegers (Pushkin Press)
- Jane Hedley-Prole for a translation of The Republic by Joost de Vries (Other Press)
- Laura Watkinson for a translation of Lampie by Annet Schaap (Pushkin Children’s)

=== 2019 ===
- Winner: Michele Hutchison for a translation of Stage Four by Sander Kollaard (Amazon Crossing)
- Runner-up: David Doherty for a translation of Monte Carlo by Peter Terrin (Macehose Press)

Shortlisted:

- Antoinette Fawcett for a translation of Bird Cottage by Eva Meijer (Pushkin Press)
- Nancy Forest-Flier for a translation of The Story of Shit by Midas Dekkers (Text Publishing)

=== 2017 ===
- Winner: David McKay for his translation of War and Turpentine by Stefan Hertmans (Harvill Secker)
- Commended: David Doherty for his translations of The Dutch Maiden by Marente de Moor and You Have Me To Love by Jaap Robben (World Editions)

=== 2015 ===
- Winners: Donald Gardner for his translation of In Those Days by Remco Campert (Shoestring Press) and Laura Watkinson for her translation of The Letter for the King by Tonke Dragt (Pushkin Press)
- Commended: Sam Garrett for his translation of Tirza by Arnon Grunberg (Open Letter)

=== 2013 ===
- Winner: David Colmer for The Misfortunates by Dimitri Verhulst (Portobello)
- Commended: Ina Rilke for The Black Lake by Hella S. Haasse (Portobello)
- Commended: Johanna W. Prins and Johanna H. Prins for Mother Number Zero by Marjolijn Hof (House of Anansi)

=== 2011 ===
- Winner: Paul Vincent for My Little War by Louis Paul Boon (Dalkey Archive Press)
- Runner-up: David Colmer for The Portrait by Willem Jan Otten (Scribe Publications)

=== 2009 ===
- Winner: Sam Garrett for Ararat: In Search of the Mythical Mountain by Frank Westerman (Harvill Secker)
- Runner Up: Francis Jones for What It Is: Selected Poems by Esther Jansma (Bloodaxe Books)

=== 2007 ===
- Winner: Susan Massotty for My Father’s Notebook by Kader Abdolah (Canongate)
- Runner-up: Sherry Marx-Macdonald for Daalder’s Chocolates by Philibert Schogt (Thunder's Mouth Press)

=== 2005 ===
- Winner: Diane Webb for Colors Demonic & Divine: Shades of Meaning in the Middle Ages & After by Herman Pleij (Columbia University Press)

=== 2003 ===
- Winner: Sam Garrett for The Rider by Tim Krabbe (Bloomsbury)
- Runner up: Susan Massotty for All Souls’ Day by Cees Nooteboom (Picador)

=== 2001 ===
- Winner: Hester Velmans for A Heart of Stone by Renate Dorrestein (Doubleday)
- Highly commended: Paul Vincent for Metaphors of Memory by Douwe Draaisma (Cambridge University Press)
- Highly commended: Stacey Knecht for Desire by Hugo Claus (Viking)
- Highly commended: Sherry Marx-Macdonald for Darwin’s Dreampond by Tijs Goldschmidt (MIT Press)

=== 1999 ===
- Winner: Ina Rilke for Roads to Santiago by Cees Noteboom (Harvill/Harcourt Brace) and The Virtuoso by Margriet de Moor (Picador)
- Highly commended: Sam Garrett for The Gates of Damascus by Lieve Joris (Lonely Planet) and Mali Blues by Lieve Joris (Lonely Planet)

=== 1996 ===
- Winner: Stacey Knecht for The Great Longing by Marcel Möring (Flamingo)
- Highly commended: Noel Clark for Lucifer by Joost van den Vondel (Absolute Press)
