= Meijsing =

Meijsing is a surname. Notable people with the surname include:

- Doeschka Meijsing (1947–2012), Dutch novelist
- Geerten Meijsing (born 1950), Dutch writer, translator, and novelist

== See also ==
- Lucas Meijs (born 1963), Dutch organizational theorist
