= Geerten =

Geerten is a given name. Notable people with this name include:

- Geerten Ten Bosch (born 1959), Dutch graphic designer and illustrator
- Geerten Meijsing (born 1950), Dutch writer, translator and novelist

== See also ==
- Gerda Geertens (born 1955), Dutch composer
