= De Bekoring =

2006 novel by Hans Münstermann

De bekoring ("The temptation") is a 2006 novel by Dutch author Hans Münstermann, which won him the AKO Literatuurprijs. It is the fifth in a series all featuring Andreas Klein as a central character, who is coming to terms with his and his family's past and present.

== Summary ==
Andreas Klein, an alter ego of Münstermann's, was born the fourth of seven children to Marianne Petersen, a Dutch woman, who married the German Joachim Klein on 10 May 1940, the day World War II breaks out for the Netherlands. Andreas and his siblings grow up during the 1950s, a time of strict morality. Andreas is his mother's favorite and becomes a writer who documents his own family, and typically spoils or disrupts important family occasions by digging up the past: in De bekoring this takes place the day his mother dies.
