= Stacey Knecht =

American translator (born 1957)

- Born: 1957 (age 68–69); Brooklyn, NY
- Occupation: Literary translator

Stacey Knecht (born 1957 in Brooklyn, NY) is an American translator. She primarily translates literary works from the Czech, Hungarian, Spanish, Dutch and Flemish languages into English.

She won the James S. Holmes Translation Award (1993) for her translation of Back to the Congo by Lieve Joris, and the inaugural Vondel Prize (1996) for her translation of The Great Longing by Marcel Möring. She was also a runner-up for the 2015 Best Translated Book Award for her translation of Harlequin’s Millions by Bohumil Hrabal.

She lives in The Hague in the Netherlands, and is a teacher of Dutch as a second language.

Knecht is founder and director of the Books Away From Home Foundation, which provides refugee children with books in their native language, to help ease their transition to an unfamiliar place.
