= Susan Massotty =

Translator

Susan Massotty is a translator, known for her translations of Dutch literary works into English. She translated The Diary of Anne Frank for the Everyman's Library. She has also translated works by Kader Abdolah, Cees Nooteboom, Abdelkader Benali and Margriet de Moor, among others. She won the Vondel Prize for Abdolah's 2000 novel My Father’s Notebook.
