= Veronica Hazelhoff =

Dutch author of children's literature (1947–2009)

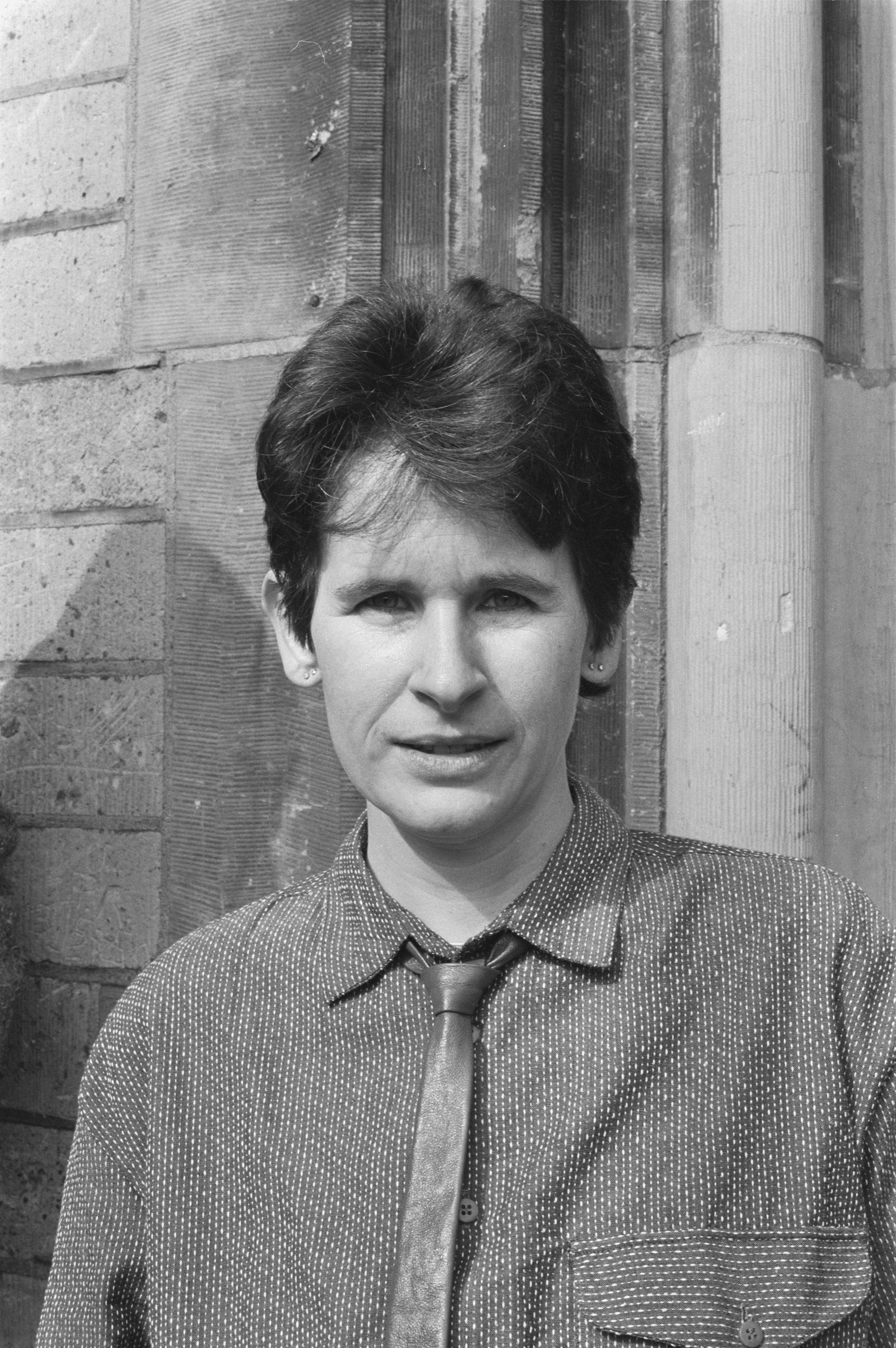
- Veronica Hazelhoff (1984)
- Born: Veronica Paula Maria (Veronica) Hazelhoff-Franken; 22 February 1947; Groenekan, Netherlands
- Died: 1 July 2009 (aged 62)
- Notable awards: Zilveren Griffel 1983 1995 2007; Gouden Griffel 1984; Nienke van Hichtum-prijs 1995

Veronica Hazelhoff (22 February 1947 – 1 July 2009) was a Dutch author of children's literature.

== Career ==
Hazelhoff made her debut in 1981 with the book Nou moe! She won the Gouden Ezelsoor award as well as the Zilveren Griffel award for this book. Hazelhoff's first three books, Nou moe! (1981), Hierzo! (1982) and Auww! (1983), feature the same character, a young girl called Maartje. Hazelhoff received an award for two out of these three books as Hazelhoff won the Gouden Griffel award in 1984 for the book Auww! Many of Hazelhoff's later books would also feature female protagonists.

She went on to win the Zilveren Griffel award two more times: in 1995 for the book Veren en in 2007 for her book Bezoek van Mister P. Hazelhoff based her book Bezoek van Mister P. on her own experience with rheumatism from which she suffered herself for most her life.

Hazelhoff also won the Nienke van Hichtum-prijs in 1995 for her book Veren (1994).

Her books have been illustrated by various illustrators, including Joep Bertrams, Sandra Klaassen and Sylvia Weve.

== Publications ==
- 1981: Nou moe!
- 1982: Hierzo!
- 1983: Auww!
- 1983: Oma, waar blijft de taart?
- 1985: Kinderkamp Utopia
- 1986: Fenna
- 1987: Ster!
- 1988: Heibel
- 1989: In Sara's huis
- 1990: Mooie dagen
- 1990: Het zondagsgevoel
- 1990: Boze ogen
- 1991: Naar Nebraska
- 1992: Een klein kreng
- 1992: De bijenkoningin
- 1993: Elmo
- 1994: Veren
- 1995: De sneeuwstorm
- 1995: Lieve Liza
- 1996: De Duivenjongen
- 1997: Niks gehoord, niks gezien
- 1999: Verloren paradijs
- 2001: Kat en Jong
- 2006: Bezoek van Mister P.

== Awards ==
- 1983: Gouden Ezelsoor, Nou moe!
- 1983: Zilveren Griffel, Nou moe!
- 1984: Gouden Griffel, Auww!
- 1995: Nienke van Hichtum-prijs, Veren
- 1995: Zilveren Griffel, Veren
- 2007: Zilveren Griffel, Bezoek van Mister P.
