= Shijie Zhishi =

Chinese bimonthly foreign affairs magazine

- Categories: Foreign affairs magazine; Political magazine
- Frequency: Bimonthly
- Founded: 1934; 92 years ago
- Country: China
- Based in: Beijing
- Language: Chinese
- ISSN: 0583-0176
- OCLC: 1765505

Shijie Zhishi (simplified Chinese: 世界知识; traditional Chinese: 世界知識; pinyin: Shìjiè zhīshì; lit. 'World Affairs') is a bimonthly semi-official foreign affairs magazine which has been in circulation since 1934 based in Beijing, China. From time to time the magazine was used as a propaganda publication by the state particularly during the Cold War. It is one of the long-running periodicals in China. It is published by World Affairs Press.

== History and profile ==
Shijie Zhishi was established in 1934. The Ministry of Foreign Affairs is in charge of the magazine. One of its early editors-in-chief was Jin Zhonghua. From 2014 Chinese novelist Lulu Wang contributed to the magazine which is published on a bimonthly basis and has 100,000 copies per each issue.

== Content ==
During the editorship of Jin Zhonghua Shijie Zhishi published several cartoons by Jack Chen. The magazine primarily features articles concerning foreign relations of China and provides discussions about the foreign policies of China to be implemented.

It also features in-depth analyses about the political tendencies and political leaders in other countries. Shijie Zhishi published lengthy comments about the Soviet leaders, including Vladimir Lenin, Joseph Stalin and Nikita Khrushchev. It also published an analysis on the neocons in the United States based on interviews with five Chinese political scientists which appeared in 2003.
