= Lulu Wang (novelist) =

Chinese-born writer (born 1960)

- 王露露 (Wáng Lùlù)
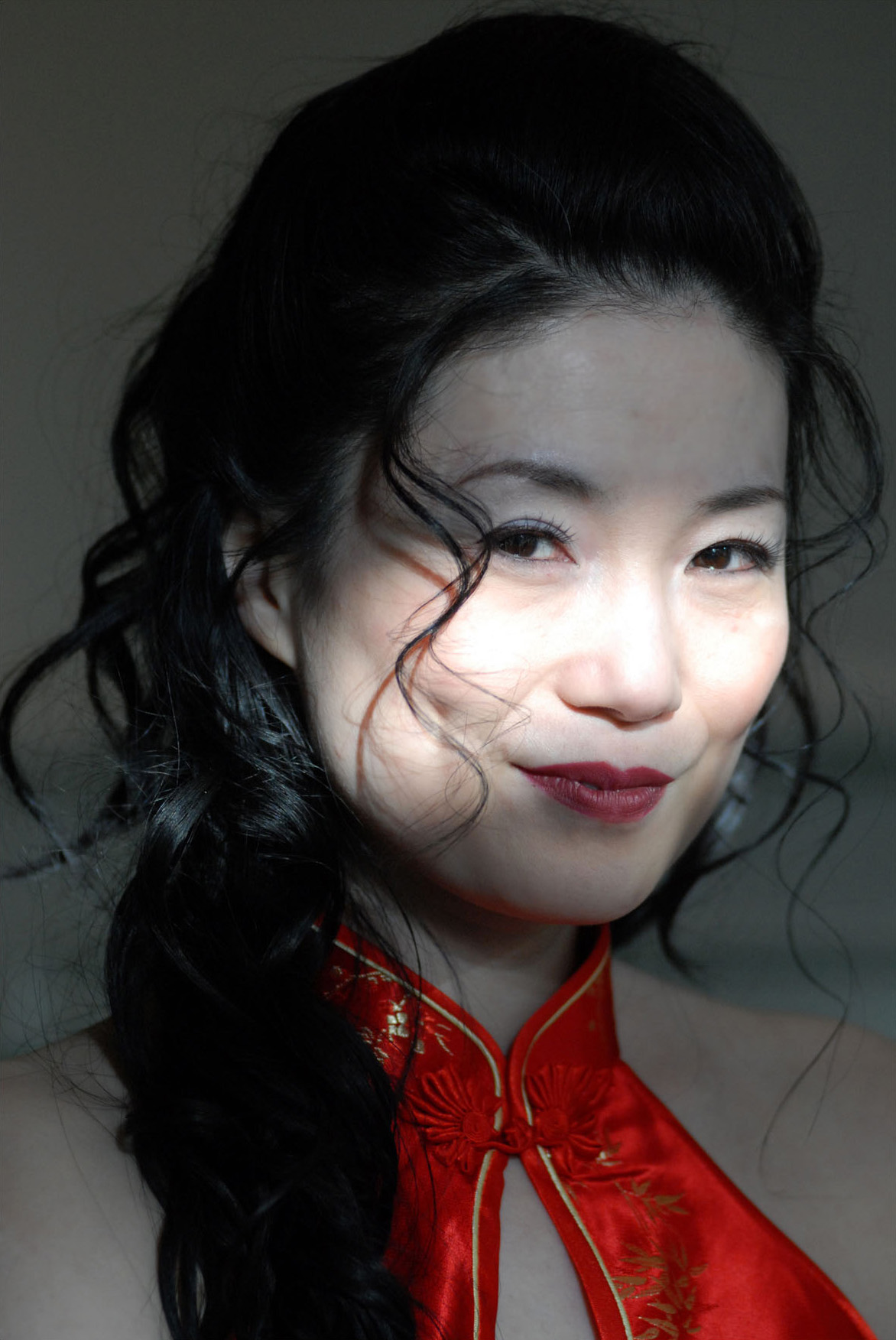
- Lulu Wang in 2007
- Born: 22 December 1960 (age 65); Beijing, China
- Education: Peking University
- Occupations: Writer, teacher
- Writing career
- Years active: 1997–present
- Website: www.luluwang.nl

Lulu Wang (Chinese: 王露露; pinyin: Wáng Lùlù; born 22 December 1960) is a Chinese-born writer who has lived in the Netherlands since 1986. She is a best-selling novelist and also a columnist for Shijie Bolan (World Vision).

== Early life ==
Lulu Wang was born on 22 December 1960 in Beijing, China. Her mother was a teacher of literature. At Peking University, Wang studied subjects including English language and literature. After graduation, she taught at the university before moving to the Netherlands in 1986, at the age of 26; there she taught Chinese at the Zuyd University of Applied Sciences in Maastricht.

== Writing career ==
In 1997, she published her semi-autobiographical debut novel, Het Lelietheater ("The Lily Theatre"), which is strewn with Chinese-language proverbs and rhymes translated into Dutch. The novel sold over 800,000 copies in the Netherlands and earned her the Gouden Ezelsoor in 1998 for the bestselling literary debut work; the following year, it won an International Nonino Prize at the Salzburg Easter Festival. In 1997, she was noted to be the best-selling Dutch-language author. The novel has been translated from Dutch into several languages, including English.

"For a while, her name was virtually the only one an average Dutch reader could produce when asked to name a Chinese writer."

Her 2010 novel, Wilde rozen is, like her debut, a book based on her life in China; this time, the main character is twelve-year-old Qiangwei, who grows up during the Cultural Revolution. Wang called it her most personal book yet. In 2012, she published Nederland, wo ai ni, a book app containing animations, music, and a discussion forum, also available as an e-book; it was later published in a printed version as well. A second book app was published in 2013, Zomervolliefde, a bilingual Dutch and Chinese publication including poems, illustrations, a song, and a short movie.

In addition to being a best-selling author, Wang works as a columnist for the international Chinese-language magazines World Vision (Chinese: 世界博览, pinyin: Shìjiè Bólǎn) and World Affairs (Chinese: 世界知识, pinyin: Shìjiè Zhīshì).

== Awards ==
- Gouden Ezelsoor (1998)
- International Nonino Prize (1999) at the Salzburg Easter Festival

== Selected works ==
- (1997) Het lelietheater (The Lily Theater)
- (1998) Brief aan mijn lezers (Letter To My Readers)
- (1999) Het tedere kind (The Tender Child)
- (2001) Het Witte Feest (The White Party)
- (2001) Seringendroom (Lilac Dream)
- (2002) Het Rode Feest (The Red Party)
- (2004) Bedwelmd (Intoxicated)
- (2007) Heldere Maan (Bright Moon)
- (2010) Wilde rozen (Wild Roses)
- (2010) Lotusvingers (Lotus Fingers)
- (2012) Nederland, wo ai ni (Netherlands, Wo Ai Ni)
- (2013) Zomervolliefde (Summer Full Love)
- (2014) Adam en Eva in China (Adam and Eva in China)
- (2015) Levenlangverliefd (Life Long in Love /情燃毕生)

== Bibliography ==
- Howell, Robert B.; Taylor, Jolanda Vanderwal (1 January 2003). History in Dutch Studies. University Press of America. ISBN 978-0-7618-2567-8.
- Idema, Wilt L. (11 December 2013). Chinese Studies in the Netherlands: Past, Present and Future. BRILL. ISBN 978-90-04-26312-3.
- Louwerse, Henriette (2007). Homeless Entertainment: On Hafid Bouazza's Literary Writing. Peter Lang. ISBN 978-3-03911-333-0.
- T'Sjoen, Yves (2004). De zwaartekracht overwonnen : dossier over 'allochtone' literatuur. Academia Press. ISBN 978-90-382-0692-9.
- Weststeijn, Willem G. (1 January 1999). Dutch Contributions 1998, Literature. Rodopi. ISBN 90-420-0715-X.
