= Eugène Peters =

Dutch painter, printmaker and sculptor (born 1946)

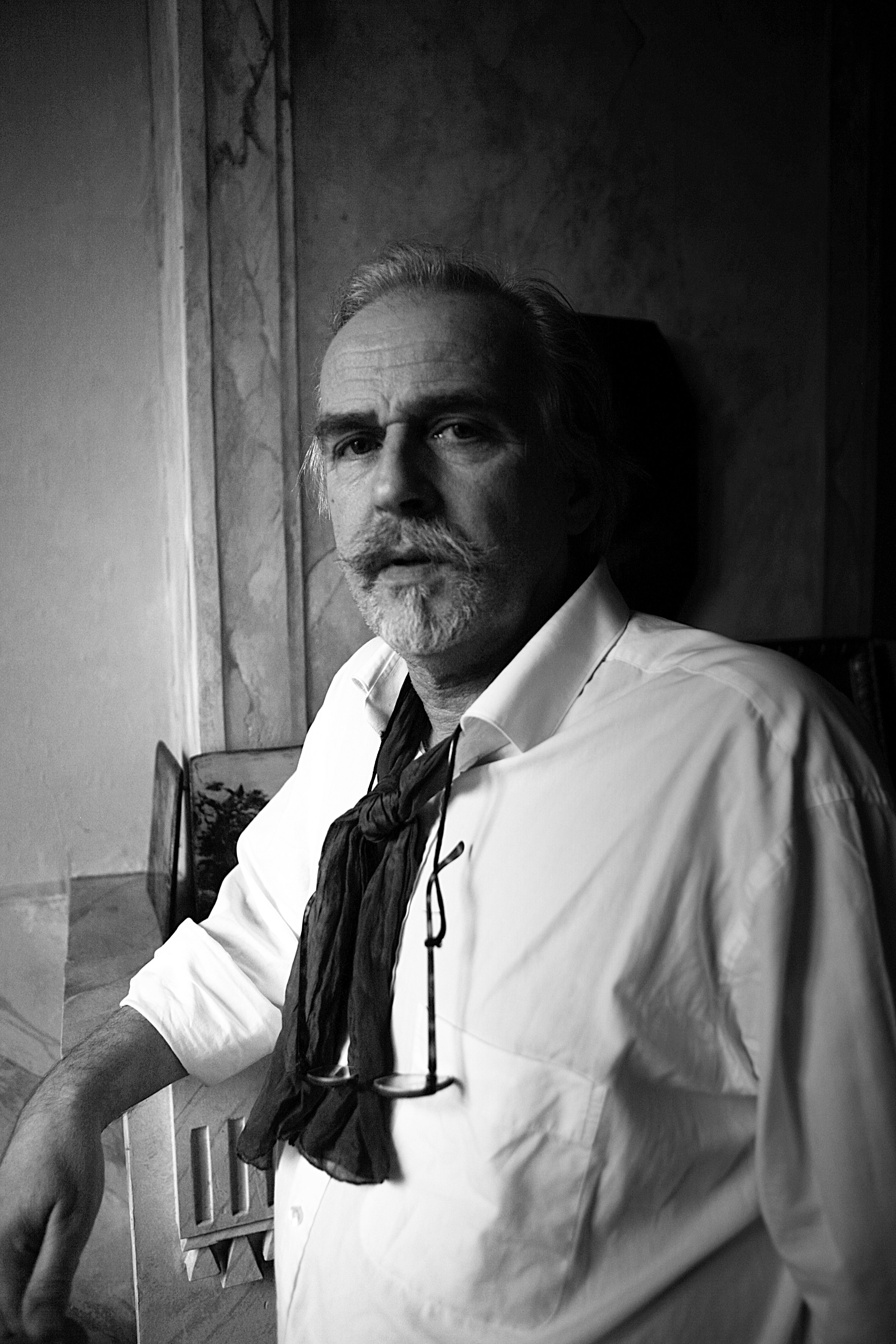
- Eugène Peters
- Born: December 1, 1946 (age 79); Eindhoven, Netherlands
- Known for: painting, sculpture, graphic design
- Movement: Fantastic Realism
- Website: eugenepeters.com

Eugène Sylvester Peters (Eindhoven, December 1, 1946) is a Dutch painter, printmaker and sculptor.

== Biography ==
After starting a degree course at the Academie voor Industriële Vormgeving in 1964 Eugène Peters left in 1968 after being offered an internship at Royal Sphinx, a designer and manufacturer of toilet bowls and other ceramic items. While there, a fellow artist, Cornelis Le Mair, recommended he should move to Antwerp, where he went on to study graphic design at the Royal Academy of Fine Arts from 1968 to 1971. His teachers in Antwerp included the etcher René De Coninck, himself a pupil of Jules De Bruycker, as well as the engraver Mark Severin, who designed several Belgian postage stamps, and Jos Hendrickx.

Having trained as a graphic designer Eugène found that this discipline offered insufficient satisfaction and so decided to teach himself to paint. He is entirely self-taught and studied the Old Masters and their techniques as a basis for developing his own unique style. Many creatures in his paintings seem nevertheless to have stepped straight out of a Hieronymus Bosch landscape, while he has also drawn inspiration from artists such as Pieter Breughel the Elder and, to take a more contemporary example, Pyke Koch.

Although others have regularly sought to classify him as a surrealist or magic realist, he himself prefers to be seen as a detail or fine art painter or, if you like, as a fantastic realist.

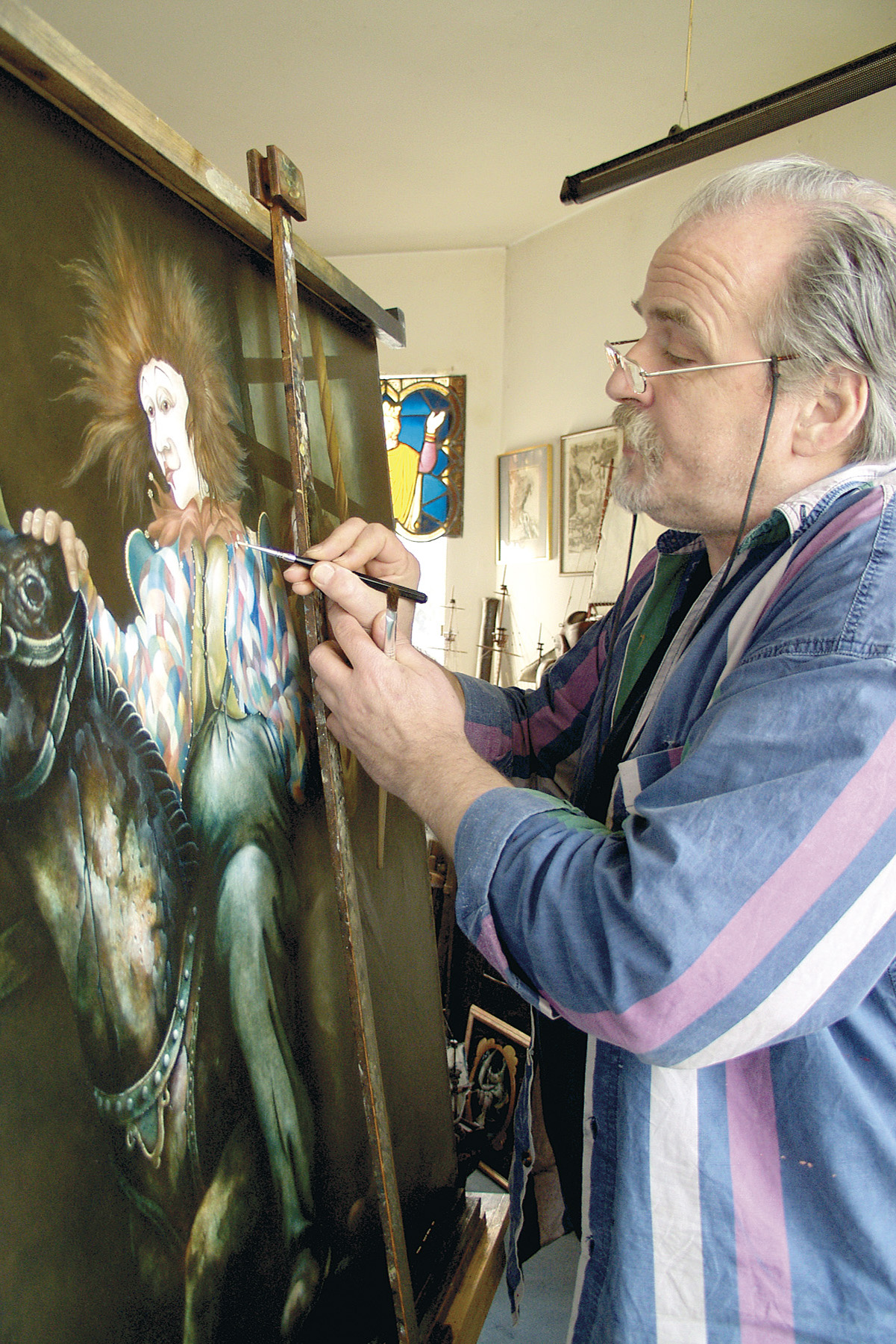
Eugène Peters in his studio.

The influence of Fantastic Realism on his work can be seen in his meticulously painted animals, with their coats fringed with exquisite fur or lace collars, or kitted out with all sorts of strange weaponry, ranging from a lance or spear to a burnt matchstick. As well as Towers of Babylon, his works regularly feature Pierrot, Harlequin and other characters from the Commedia dell'arte, as well as imaginary and real cities such as Antwerp and Turnhout.

While continuing to paint he also later taught himself to cast statues in bronze. Although this began as an experiment, it has since become a passion, and the statues he makes can be seen as the three-dimensional counterparts of the characters in his paintings.

His work also includes engraving and glass painting.

He married Anna Carolina Honings on January 25, 1978, and the couple has two daughters.

== Museums ==
Museums owning works by Eugène Peters include:

- Antwerp Zoo museum
- Markiezenhof in Bergen op Zoom

== Other information ==
Commissions in bronze:

- Statuette for the annual AKO Prize for Literature
- Bronze plaque commemorating the artist Claude Monet in the Southern French city of Antibes
- Annual ‘golden plume’ for Unizo Turnhout (Union of Self-Employed Entrepreneurs)
- Young Talent prize for the Jacques de Leeuw Foundation
- Statue of Monsignor Bekkers for the Jacques de Leeuw Foundation
