= World Affairs Press =

Chinese state publisher

World Affairs Press 世界知识出版社
- Founded: 1934; 91 years ago
- Headquarters location: Beijing, China
- Owner: Ministry of Foreign Affairs of the People's Republic of China
- Official website: www.ishizhi.cn

World Affairs Press (世界知识出版社) is a publishing house under the Ministry of Foreign Affairs of the People's Republic of China. It originated from the Shijie Zhishi magazine founded by Hu Yuzhi and Zou Taofen in 1934. It is an authoritative publishing house specializing in international issues with a broad social influence.

== Overview ==
The World Affairs Press was established in 1934, with bridging China and the world as its purpose. It has published authoritative works as the Diplomatic History of the People's Republic of China (1949–1956), China's Diplomacy (one volume each year), and the Postwar Diplomatic History of Great Powers. It has also published the biographies of a lot of famous international figures of the modern times, including Richard Nixon, George H. W. Bush, Jacques Chirac, Saddam Hussein, and Mikhail Gorbachev.

== See also ==
- China Foreign Affairs University
