= Nederlands Letterenfonds =

Dutch literature organization

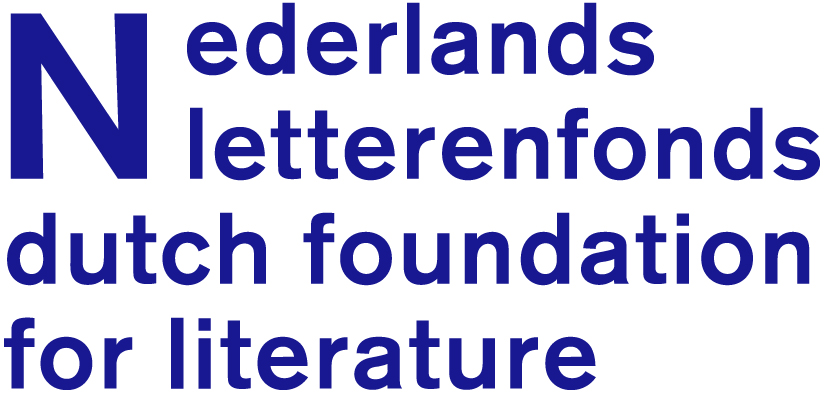

The Nederlands Letterenfonds ("Dutch Foundation for Literature") is a Dutch organization that promotes Dutch literature at home and abroad. The Letterenfonds represents Dutch authors at such events as the Frankfurt Book Fair, and awards a number of prizes for writers and translators. Its current president is Romkje de Bildt.

Among the prizes the Nederlands Letterenfonds awards are the Toneelschrijfprijs, the Europese Literatuurprijs and the Vondel Prize.
