= War and Turpentine =

2013 novel by Stefan Hertmans

- First edition
- Author: Stefan Hertmans
- Original title: Oorlog en terpentijn
- Language: Dutch
- Publisher: De Bezige Bij
- Publication date: 2013

War and Turpentine (original title in Dutch: Oorlog en terpentijn) is a 2013 novel by Belgian author Stefan Hertmans, originally published by De Bezige Bij. It is a novel about his grandfather, the artist Urbain Martien, during World War I. Hertmans says he based it on the notebooks his grandfather gave him in 1981. It was translated into English by David McKay and published by Pantheon Books in the US and by Harvill Secker in the UK. It has been translated in twenty languages so far. By 2015, the Dutch version had sold over 200,000 copies. It was longlisted for the Man Booker International Prize in 2017.

== Synopsis ==
The work of historical fiction reconstructs the life of the narrator’s grandfather, Urbain Martien, before, during and after the First World War – as parts 1, 2 and 3 of the book. The narrator opens with a framing device, purporting to draw upon recollections in notebooks left him by the grandfather. (In an interview, Hertmans asserted that the novel indeed captures the memories of his own grandfather as recorded in a pair of notebooks decades after the war. “He gave me the notebooks a few months before he died, in 1981.” The novel’s narrator left the notebooks unread, until gaining the wherewithal to face the material, and then to re-work them into a work of fiction, some thirty years later—the hundredth anniversary of the war.

The main character, Urbain Martien, was raised in a suburban quarter of Ghent during the belle-époque, and was devoted to his Roman Catholic faith. His father, Franciscus Martien, worked as a fresco painter for parish churches in the Low Countries and finally, in England. Urbain, in turn, acquired an interest in drawing and painting from his father. Urbain's mother, Céline Andries, endured the premature death of her husband, remarried, and saw her son Urbain off to work in a foundry and then, in 1914, off to war.

At the outbreak of the Great War, the 23 year-old Urbain is sent to the front, where he becomes a soldier and decorated combat hero. The agonies of trench warfare are described “from up close.” Injuries eventually take Ubain to recover in Liverpool, the site of one of his father's paintings.

In the third section, Urbain returns home, falls in love with Maria Emelia Ghys. Before he can marry, the story takes a tragic turn, when Maria succumbs in the Spanish flu epidemic. Urbain marries Maria's sister Gabrielle, producing a daughter (the narrator's mother) in 1922, but the union lacks the affection Urbain had known with Maria Emielia. Urbain continues as a devoted artist (and especially as a copyist) into early retirement and until his death. The grandson, the narrator, visits sites in West Flanders and reviews personal archival materials, in an attempt to understand, even reconstruct, something of his grandfather's life experiences.

== Reception ==
It was named one of the 10 Best Books of 2016 by The New York Times Book Review. It was also included in the list of Books of the Year from The Economist The review in the Guardian called it a "future classic" and compared it to the works of W. G. Sebald, as did the NYT Book Review.

The Irish Times gave it a less favourable review, calling it "an important work" but negatively comparing the "somewhat flat and toneless" prose to that of W. G. Sebald and calling it "less convincing artistically".

== Awards ==
- 2014: AKO Literatuurprijs
- 2016: Inktaap

== Translations ==
- Min bedstefars himmel, Danish, 2014, translated by Birthe Lundsgaard, People's Press
- Krig og terpentin, Norwegian, 2014, translated by Hedda Vormeland, Pax
- Rat i terpentin, Serbian, 2014, translated by Ivana Šćepanović, Heliks
- Guerre et térébenthine, French, 2015, translated by Isabelle Rosselin, Gallimard
- Guerra e trementina, Italian, 2015, translated by Laura Pignatti, Marsilio
- Der Himmel meines Großvaters, German, 2015, translated by Ira Wilhelm, Hanser Verlag
- Wojny i terpentyna, Polish, 2015, translated by Alicja Oczko, Marginesy
- Japanese translation, 2015
- Vojna in terpentin, Slovenian, 2015, translated by Staša Pavlović, Studentska zalozba
- Krig of terpentin, Swedish, 2015, translated by Ingrid Wikén Bonde, Norstedts
- War and Turpentine, English, 2016, translated by David McKay
- Oorlog en terpentyn, Afrikaans, 2016, translated by Daniel Hugo, Protea Boekhuis
- Háború és terpentin, Hungarian, 2016, translated by Miklós Fenyves, Európa
- Croatian version, 2016, translated by Romana Perečinec, Fraktura
