= Hans Münstermann =

Dutch writer

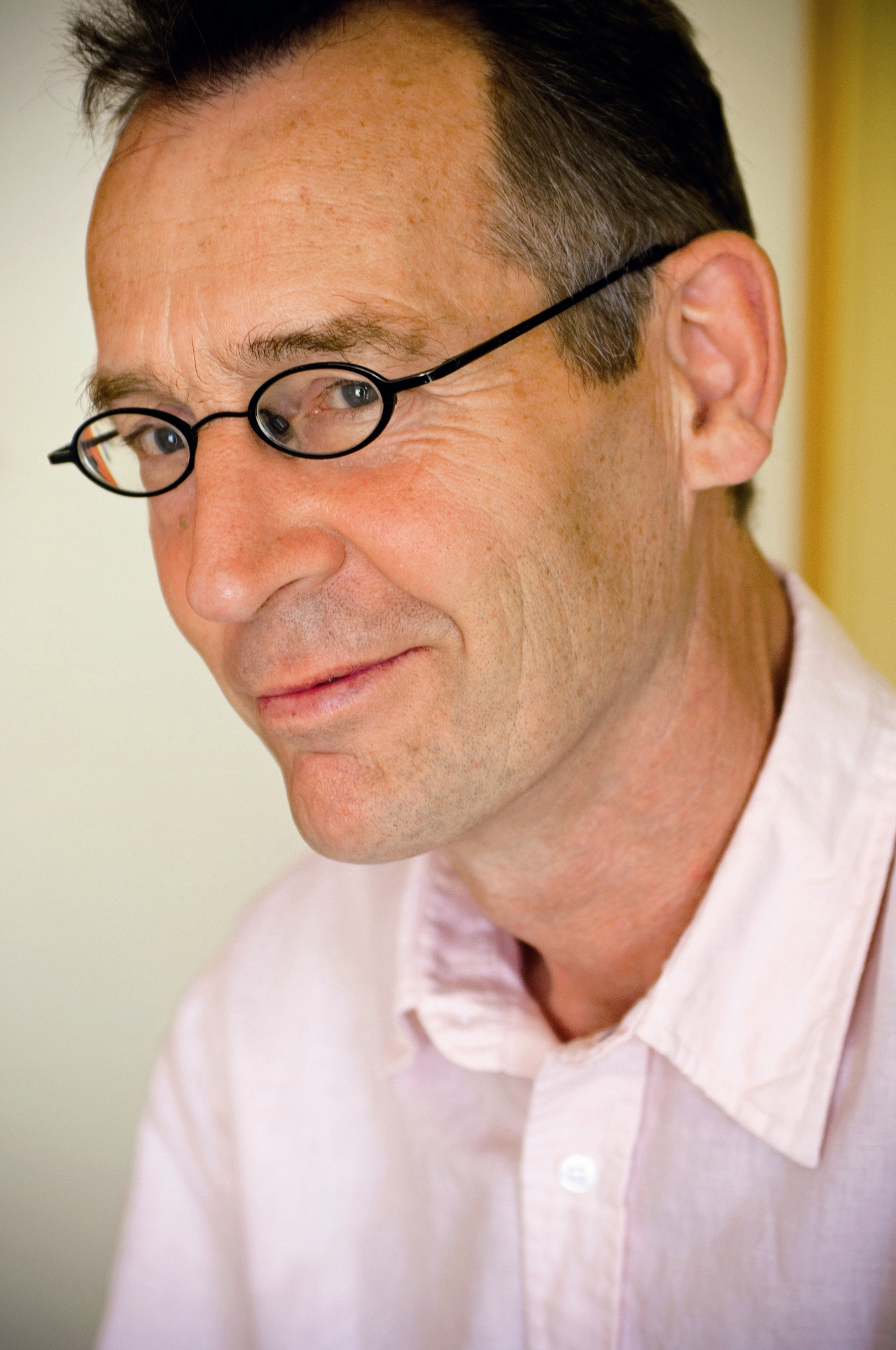
Hans Münstermann

Hans Münstermann (born 1947 in Arnhem) is a Dutch novelist, writer of almost a dozen novels. About half of them form a generational novel sequence that follows the life of a baby boomer named Andreas Klein, the son of a Dutch mother and a German man. His 2006 novel, De Bekoring, the fifth in that series, won the AKO Literatuurprijs in 2006; the sixth, Ik kom je halen als het zomer is, was published in 2010. Münstermann has a doctorate in theatrical studies and has worked at an academy in Maastricht since the 1980s, and from 1990 to 1995 he was a coordinator in actor training. He has also written a number of novels together with Jacques Hendrikx, under the pseudonym Jan Tetteroo.

== Andreas Klein ==
Andreas Klein was seen as an alter ego of Münstermann's by critics including Elsbeth Etty. Like Münstermann, Klein's mother is from Arnhem. Her maiden name is Marianne Petersen, and she marries the German Joachim Klein on 10 May 1940, the day World War II breaks out for the Netherlands, with the Germans invading the country. Their marriage appears devoid of love; Andreas is the fourth of seven children who grow up beginning in the 1950s, a time of strict morality. Andreas is his mother's favorite and becomes a writer who documents his own family, and typically spoils or disrupts important family occasions by digging up the past and announcing the results of his personal investigations—in Het gelukkige jaar 1940 he spoils his youngest brother's birthday, and in De bekoring the day his mother dies.

== Works ==
- Het gelukkige jaar 1940 (2000)
- Je moet niet denken dat ik altijd bij je blijf (2001)
- Certificaat van echtheid (2003)
- De Hitlerkus (2004)
- De bekoring (2006, Nieuw Amsterdam)
- Het gelukkige jaar 1940 (2007, Nieuw Amsterdam)
- Je moet niet denken dat ik altijd bij je blijf (2007, Nieuw Amsterdam)
- Land zonder Sarah (2008, Nieuw Amsterdam)
- Ik kom je halen als het zomer is (2010, Nieuw Amsterdam)
- "Mischa" (2013, Uitgeverij De Kring)

As a joint pseudonym Jan Tetteroo, along with Jacques Hendrikx:

- No flash (1992)
- De laatste Nederlandse man (1993)
- Korte historie van het Nederlandse volk (1995)
- Bozoc (2001)
