= Gouden Ezelsoor =

Dutch literary award

Gouden Ezelsoor ("Golden Donkey Ear") was an award for the best-selling literary debut in the Netherlands. It was first awarded in 1979 and last awarded in 2008.

== Recipients ==
- 1979: Monica Sauwer for Mooie boel
- 1980: Alexander van Es for Anatomie van het gevoel
- 1981: Richard Steegen for Pakken...gepakt
- 1982: Annie van de Oever for Dame in broekpak
- 1983: two recipients
  - René Stoute for Op de rug van vuile zwanen
  - Veronica Hazelhoff for Nou moe!
- 1984: Tessa de Loo for De meisjes van de suikerwerkfabriek
- 1985: Adriaan van Dis for Nathan Sid
- 1986: Fleur Bourgonje for De terugkeer
- 1987: Rudi van Dantzig for Voor een verloren soldaat
- 1988: Hanny Alders for Non nobis
- 1989: Margriet de Moor for Op de rug gezien
- 1990: Lisette Lewin for Voor bijna alles bang geweest
- 1991: Ernst Timmer for Het waterrad van Ribe
- 1992: Connie Palmen for De wetten
- 1993: Ronald Giphart for Ik ook van jou
- 1994: Kader Abdolah for De adelaars
- 1996: Arnon Grunberg for Blauwe maandagen
- 1997: Ineke Holtwijk for Kannibalen van Rio
- 1998: Lulu Wang for Het lelietheater
- 1999: Jessica Durlacher for Het geweten
- 2000: Erwin Mortier for Marcel
- 2001: Maya Rasker for Met onbekende bestemming
- 2002: Khalid Boudou for Het schnitzelparadijs
- 2003: Judith Koelemeijer for Het zwijgen van Maria Zachea
- 2004: not awarded
- 2005: Annelies Verbeke for Slaap!
- 2006: Gerbrand Bakker for Boven is het stil
- 2007: not awarded
- 2008: Christiaan Weijts for Art.285b
