= The Asylum Seeker =

2003 novel by Arnon Grunberg

De asielzoeker
- Author: Arnon Grunberg
- Language: Dutch
- Publisher: Nijgh & Van Ditmar
- Publication date: 2003
- Publication place: Netherlands
- Media type: Print
- Pages: 353
- ISBN: 90-388-2714-8
- OCLC: 67010687

The Asylum Seeker (Dutch: De asielzoeker) is a novel by Dutch author Arnon Grunberg. Published in 2003, the novel won the AKO Literatuurprijs and Ferdinand Bordewijk Prijs in 2004, and has been reprinted more than fourteen times. The jury rapport for the AKO Literatuurprijs praised the novel for being shocking, amusing, and touching all at once, and for its undoing of the bourgeois underpinnings of our society.

== Plot ==
Christian Beck, a translator of technical manuals, has concluded that life consists of nothing but self-deception and illusions, and decides to devote his time to unmasking all illusions, false hopes, and high ideals. He denounces all deception in his friends and family and promises his own unmasking as a finale; swearing off all personal desire, he now dedicates his life to the happiness of his girlfriend, "Bird", a former prostitute. The couple lived for a time in Eilat, Israel, where Beck was a regular customer to the brothel and Bird was sleeping with ugly, deformed men. Back in Europe, it becomes clear that she is suffering from a fatal disease, and before she dies agrees to marry an asylum seeker from Algeria so he can attain permanent residence. Beck protests initially but later agrees to the marriage. The asylum seeker also gratifies Bird sexually, and a strange ménage à trois is the result.

== Interpretation and reception ==
Dutch critics have responded in various ways, calling the novel shocking, depressing, and disconcerting, but also witty and touching. It is one of the most controversial books in recent Dutch literary history, and Erica van Boven has argued that the work compares to that of Jean-Paul Sartre, Albert Camus, Franz Kafka, and W.F. Hermans.

In Belgium, the novel was well-received, and within a few years was available in the series "Pearls of literature in Dutch," a collection of "the best twenty novels in Dutch of all time." Reviewing that edition, Dirk Leyman of De Morgen praises Grunberg's new direction (earlier, he had gained recognition as an absurdist) and the precision with which he captures both the protagonist and the reader.

== Dramatic adaptation ==
Two years after the novel's publication, a stage adaptation was produced in Ghent, the first production by Nationaal Theater Gent's new director, Johan Simons, and a production praised in de Volkskrant. The protagonist was played by Wim Opbrouck, one of Belgium's most notable stage actors.
