= Doeschka Meijsing =

Dutch novelist (1947–2012)

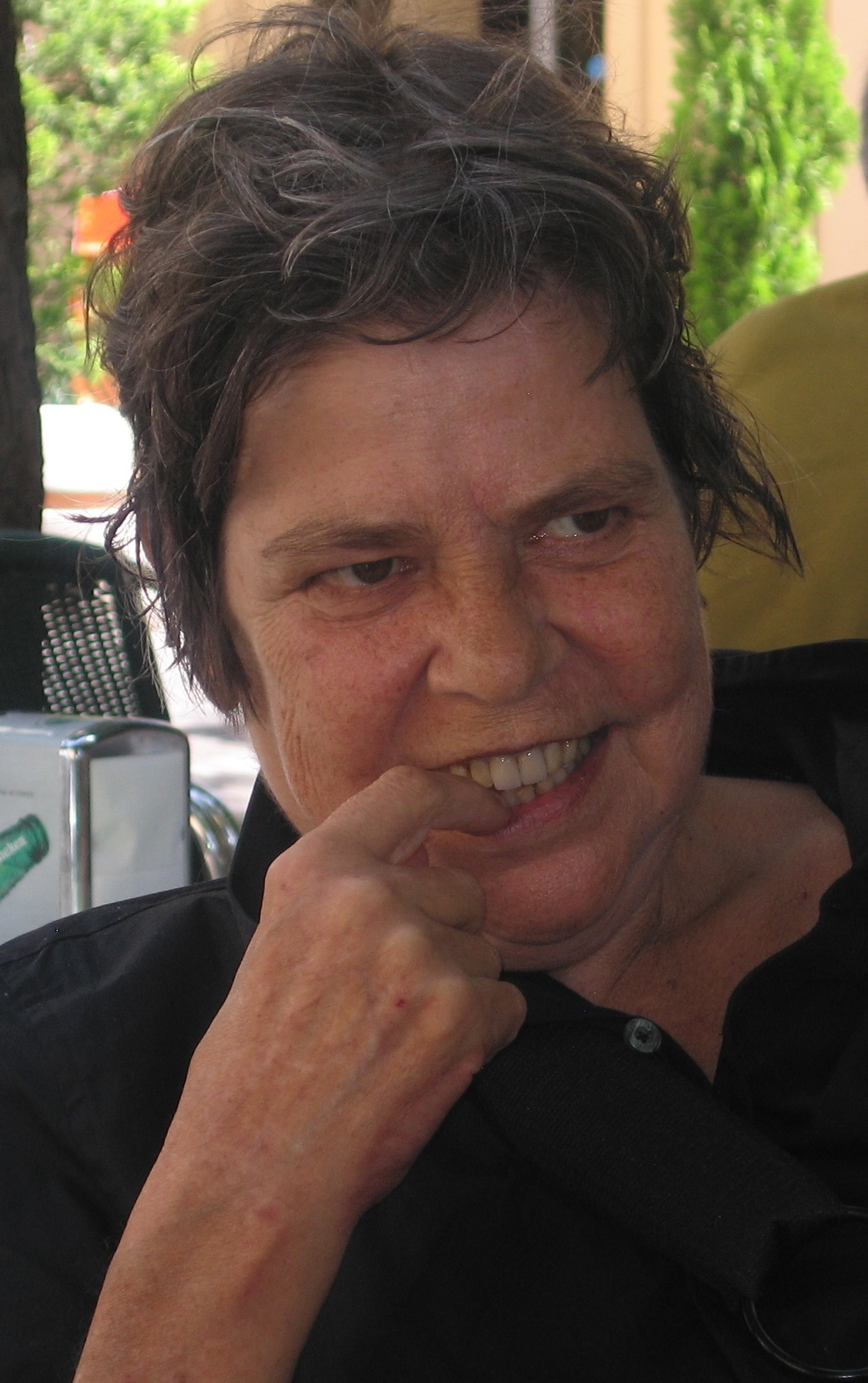
Doeschka Meijsing

Maria Johanna Meijsing (21 October 1947 – 30 January 2012) was a Dutch novelist. She won the AKO Literatuurprijs in 2000 for her novel De tweede man, and in 2008 the Ferdinand Bordewijk Prijs for her novel Over de liefde. Doeschka Meijsing is the older sister of writer Geerten Meijsing and philosopher Monica Meijsing.

== Biography ==
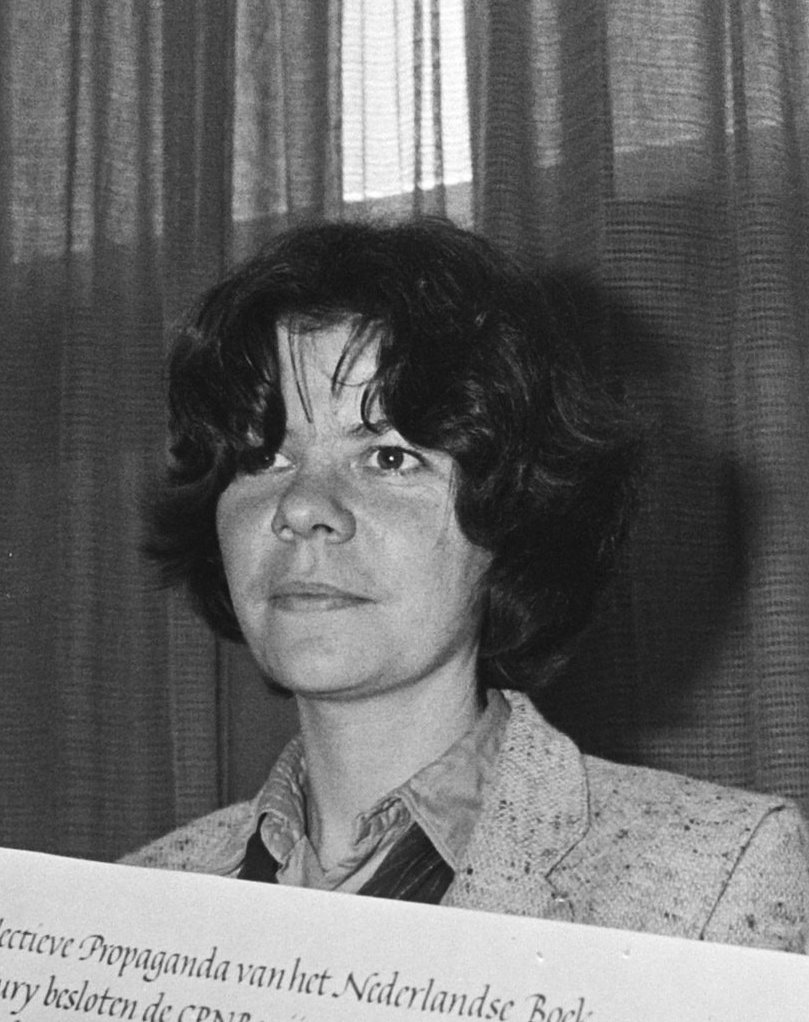
Doeschka Meijsing (1981)

Meijsing was born in Eindhoven, on 21 October 1947. When she was three years old, Meijsing and her family moved to Haarlem. She studied Dutch Language and Literary Studies at the University of Amsterdam. Meijsing was a teacher at the St. Ignatius Gymnasium from 1971 to 1976. She subsequently held a position as a research assistant at the University of Amsterdam's Institute for Dutch Studies until 1978. That year, she took up a post as editor of the literary supplement of the influential Dutch magazine Vrij Nederland and in 1989 she became literary editor of leading current-affairs weekly Elsevier.

== Writing ==
From 1969 Meijsing published work in literary magazine Podium, and later she also published in De Revisor. Hence her work has been referred to as being in the Revisor style. In 1974, her first collection of short stories De hanen en andere verhalen was published. The guest lectures she gave at the University of Groningen have been collected in Hoe verliefd is de toeschouwer? (1988). Meijsing also wrote poetry (Paard Heer Mantel, 1986). In 1997 she won the Opzij Literature Prize (which was then called the Annie Romein Prize).

== Literary themes ==
Major themes in Meijsing's work include the relationship between imagination and reality, the fascination for an admired person - and consequential jealousy - and time. Her protagonists tend to be vulnerable outsiders who escape into fantasy.

Meijsing was lesbian and had several relationships with women. Her latest novel Over de liefde, published in 2008 and a recipient of the AKO Literature Prize, the F. Bordewijk Prize and the Opzij Literature Award, was inspired by her relationship with journalist Xandra Schutte. This relationship ended after Schutte left her for someone else.

== Death ==
Meijsing died at the age of 64 from complications of major surgery. She lived until her death in Amsterdam, in an apartment above that of her ex-partner.

== Bibliography ==
- 1974 – De hanen en andere verhalen
- 1976 – Robinson
- 1977 – De kat achterna
- 1980 – Tijger, tijger!
- 1982 – Utopia of De geschiedenissen van Thomas
- 1982 – Zwaluwen en Augustein
- 1985 – Ik ben niet in Haarlem geboren
- 1986 – Paard Heer Mantel
- 1987 – Beer en Jager
- 1988 – Hoe verliefd is de toeschouwer?
- 1990 – De beproeving
- 1992 – Vuur en zijde
- 1994 – Beste vriend
- 1996 – De angstige waakhond
- 1996 – De weg naar Caviano
- 2000 – De tweede man
- 2002 – 100% chemie
- 2005 – Moord en doodslag
- 2008 – Over de liefde
