= Marente de Moor =

Dutch writer

- Marente de Moor - 2024
- Born: 1972 (age 53–54); The Hague, Netherlands
- Education: University of Amsterdam
- Occupation: Writer
- Writing career
- Language: Dutch
- Notable awards: AKO Literatuurprijs (2011); EU Prize for Literature (2014)
- Website: www.marentedemoor.com

Marente de Moor (Dutch pronunciation: [maːˈrɛntə də ˈmoːr]; born 1972) is a Dutch novelist and columnist. She published five novels and two collections of short stories. She won the AKO Literatuurprijs (2011) and the European Union Prize for Literature (2014) for her novel De Nederlandse maagd (2010). Her work is translated into sixteen languages.

== Life and career ==
Marente de Moor was born in 1972 in The Hague in the Netherlands. She is the daughter of writer and piano teacher Margriet de Moor (born 1941) and visual artist Heppe de Moor (1938–1992). She studied Slavic language and literature at the Universiteit van Amsterdam and graduated in 1999. She lived in Russia from 1991 to 2001.

De Moor was a columnist for De Groene Amsterdammer. A collection of her columns in De Groene was published as Petersburgse vertellingen (Petersburgian tales) in 1999. Since 2009, she is a columnist for Vrij Nederland (VN). A collection of her columns in VN was published as Kleine vogel, grote man (Small bird, big man) in 2013.

Her fiction debut was the novel De overtreder (The offender) in 2007. He second novel De Nederlandse maagd (The Dutch virgin) was published in 2010 and won the AKO Literatuurprijs in 2011 and the European Union Prize for Literature in 2014. Her third novel Roundhay, tuinscène (Roundhay, garden scene) was published in 2013 (in 2018 as 'Aus dem Licht' by Hanser Verlag.) Her fourth novel 'Phon' was published in 2019 in Dutch and in 2021 in German by Hanser Verlag.

== Awards ==
- AKO Literatuurprijs (2011) for De Nederlandse maagd
- European Union Prize for Literature (2014) for De Nederlandse maagd
- J.M.A. Biesheuvelprijs (2016) for Gezellige verhalen
- F.Bordewijkprijs (2019) for Foon
- Jan Wolkersprijs (2019) for Foon

== Bibliography ==
- Petersburgse vertellingen. Jaren in Rusland. Amsterdam: Querido. 1999. ISBN 978-90-214-0285-7.
- De overtreder. Amsterdam: Querido. 2007. ISBN 978-90-214-3353-0.
- De Nederlandse maagd. Amsterdam: Querido. 2010. ISBN 978-90-214-3842-9.
  - The Dutch Maiden. Translated by Doherty, David. London: World Editions. 2016. ISBN 978-94-6238-077-6.
- Roundhay, tuinscène. Amsterdam: Querido. 2013. ISBN 978-90-214-4996-8.
- Kleine vogel, grote man. Maartensdijk: B for books. 2013. ISBN 978-90-8516-283-4.
- Gezellige verhalen. Amsterdam: Querido. 2015. ISBN 978-90-214-5887-8.
- Foon. Amsterdam: Querido. 2018. ISBN 978-90-214-1200-9.
- De schoft. Amsterdam: Querido. 2023. ISBN 978-90-214-7553-0.
