= Sam Garrett =

- Born: Samuel Alexander Garrett; 28 August 1990 (age 35); Derbyshire, England
- Genres: Reggae; acoustic; folk
- Occupations: Singer; songwriter; musician
- Instruments: Vocals; Guitar; Djembe
- Years active: 2005–present
- Label: Dcypha Productions
- Website: www.samgarrettmusic.com

Samuel Alexander Garrett (born 28 August 1990) is an English singer and songwriter. Sam Garrett released his debut EP Be Easy in 2013 followed by the second EP Namaste released in 2014. In 2016, Garrett released his two-part acoustic EP titled Grace. Sam Garrett has been creating and singing devotional songs. In 2017, Garrett released his first studio album, Grace.

== Early life and musical career ==
Sam Garrett grew up around music, as his father would play records by bands such as Nirvana and Pearl Jam. At the age of nine, Garrett began learning how to play guitar and arranging some compositions. After a long period of learning the instrument, Garrett started to play in several friends' local rock bands, during this time he fronted a punk rock group called Wild Youth. Garrett, at the age of 20, left those bands and started to write his own songs in solitude at the countrysides of England. During this period, Garrett started to showcase around the country and won at the UK festival "Live and Unsigned" in the "Acoustic" category. In 2011, Garrett was featured on UK rapper Sway's album The Deliverance, the first time the two collaborated. On 11 August 2012, Garrett performed his songs "Hope" and "Be Easy" on The Beat on BBC Radio 1.

In 2013, those songs featured Sam Garrett debut EP called Be Easy produced by Jake Gosling and Sway.

In 2014, Garrett self-released his second EP titled Namaste after moving to a yoga retreat, Ashram in Glastonbury, in June 2013. On 28 April 2015, Sam was featured to play at the Mind Body Spirit London Festival. Later in 2016, Sam Garrett signed with Dcypha Productions to release his acoustic EP Grace, which he dedicated to the spiritual master Bhagavan Sri Ramana Maharishi and Mooji. The same year, Garrett played at the Hebridean Celtic Festival.

=== 2016-2018: Grace ===
Garrett began recording his debut full-length album after releasing his acoustic EP. The album production was finished in August. Garrett stated in a social media post that the album would feature a song never officially released, called "Butterfly".

Sam later announced on his Facebook that the title of his album would be the same as his acoustic EP, Grace". The first single, "Shrines" was released on 3 October. The album was released on 24 November. In 2018 Garrett started producing his new album, releasing on 17 September the single "The Dance & the Wonder".

=== 2018 - 2019: The Dance & The Wonder ===
On 10 December 2018, the track I am Loving You was released as a single, and will later be included on the album The Dance & The Wonder. The song has totalled 916,000 listens on Spotify in June 2022.

On 19 February 2019 Sam Garrett released another single featuring one song Brave Beautiful Animals which will also appear on the album The Dance & The Wonder later. By June 2022 the single had reached nearly 552,000 listens on Spotify.

On 12 July 2019, Garrett released his second album titled The Dance & the Wonder, including the album's eponymous song, which has just over 2,800,000 listens on Spotify in June 2022.

=== 2019: Light Of Your Grace and Hummingbird ===
On 25 November 2019 the single Light Of Your Grace, comprising one song, was released, being the live performance of the song Light Of Your Grace at Monte Sahaja in Portugal. This collaboration with Mollie Mendoza has over 3 Million listens on Spotify in June 2022.

On 12 December 2019 Sam Garrett released the single Hummingbird. The song is not included on any album and has just under 178,000 listens on Spotify in June 2022.

=== 2020 - 2021: Various Collaborations and Live Appearances ===
On 28 April 2020, Sam released an cover of the song Om Ganesha, originally written by Sam, as a single. It is a collaboration between Mose a musician based in Guatemala and Sam Garrett himself. This adaptation has over 3,200,000 listens on Spotify in June 2022. However the song is not on the Inside EP.

On 26 May 2020 the Inside EP was released. It includes, especially, the long song Higher (12 minutes), which has reached more than 720,000 listens on Spotify in June 2022.

In the spring of 2021, Sam Garrett performed at the Shanti Space in Portugal and sang We are One, a song featured on the Namaste ep.

On 11 May 2021, Mose and Sam collaborate again. This time, Mose remixes the song The Dance & The Wonder, which has almost 220,000 listens on Spotify in June 2022.

In September - October 2021, Sam Garrett travelled to Hawaii to see his friend Paul Izak, guitarist, harmonica player and singer. The two performed the songs La'au Lapa'au and Steady Rhythm and released both songs on social networks.

=== 2021: Asatoma then Root Down Deep ===
On 4 January 2021 Sam Garrett released a new song titled Asatoma. The song is the only on the single Asatoma and was a collaboration between Sam Garrett and his partner Mollie Mendoza. Leon Marley Itzler appears on this album as producer and bassist. Asatoma has just over 800,000 listens on Spotify in June 2022. The term Asatoma refers to Hinduism, to a mantra more precisely: Om Asatoma. This mantra allows (according to hinduism) one to pass from ignorance to knowledge and from death to eternal life.

On 21 December 2021, Sam Garrett released an album (Root Down Deep) in collaboration with his partner Mollie Mendoza. The songs are written by them, and the album is produced by Leon Marley Itzler. The spiritual, religious dimension is always present, notably with the songs / mantras Om Ganesha and Lakshmi (I Choose to Love in Love), which have (approximately) 267,000 and 532,000 listens respectively on Spotify in June 2022. The album also includes the song Mama released as a single on 1 July 2021, again with Mollie Mendoza, Leon Marley Itzler on bass, and Regina Rhythm as percussionist. The song reached over 1,000,000 listens on Spotify.

=== 2022 : Various Tours and other collaborations ===
In January 2022, Sam Garrett collaborated again with Paul Izak. The song Bloom is released on social networks and filmed from Hawaii on the island of Oahu.

From 23 April 2022 the "Stay Open To Life" tour started in Costa Rica with 9 announced dates. He was accompanied by Roaman, a guitarist from Rome. The tour ended with the last date on 3 June 2022.

He announced on the social network Instagram that from 24 June to 3 July he would perform at the Yoga United Festival in Germany.

In August 2022 he performed at Shanti Space in Portugal in collaboration with singer Jack Weaver, before collaborating again with Mose at Sacred Soul Fest in September 2022.

The same month, Sam Garrett went to Essencia, a wellness center, where he animates the weekend by playing in particular with the singer Roaman. Australian musician Xavier Rudd was also there this weekend.

On 16 September 2022 a new single was released in collaboration with the singer and yogini Ajeet. The song is called Water And Sky and lasts 4 minutes.

=== 2022: Forward To Zion and I & I ===
On 25 July 2022, he announced the release of his next single Forward To Zion in collaboration with Paul Izak. The release date is set for 11 August 2022. Sam said during the Listening Party available on YouTube that he was inspired by Paul to create the song. During the first Lockdown in England, he says that "times were strange" and that "no one really knew what was going on". Paul Izak's album Back To The Roots would be a source of consolation, especially the song Permaculture.

Alongside his various collaborations, Sam announces on Instagram, in the form of a promotional clip, the arrival of a new single named I & I scheduled for November 11, 2022. At the end of October, Sam delivers a new message on social networks, in which he tells the genesis of the song. He was touched by the "beauty" and "majesty" of the words of a Rastaman by the name of Ras Elder Iron Teacha. Sam shows this video to a friend, and under an "impulse" he decides to strum chords on his guitar and begins to sing the words: "Give thanks for life, and praises to the most high". His friend continues singing: "Don't waste your time, imprisoned in the mind", and it is by the "Grace of God" that the song was written. Later, Sam performs at a festival in Germany and comes into contact with "Flagman Judah", before Ras Iron Teacha tells him that he likes the song and that he has his "blessing" to use his voice, which can be heard at the beginning of the song.

=== 2023: Why They Make Us Cry ===
On the occasion of International Women's day, Sam announces the release of a new single Why They Make Us Cry. He explains why this song is important to him in an Instagram post:

When Covid hit I came across a video of how chocolate is produced and the people involved in that process. I was struck by the massive inequality and the amount of money the growers and harvesters of the cacao were paid compared to the business owners at the top of the chain. The price that the growers get paid is set by the government who have ties with the business owners at the top, and they set the price very low so that they can reap as much of the rewards as possible leaving little to nothing for the very foundation, the farmers.

— Sam Garrett, https://www.instagram.com/p/Cnmg1nqriwR/

The song was performed in Berlin on March 7, a music video, shot at the School Of Vision Guest House, was released shortly afterwards.

== Personal life ==
Garrett has one daughter named Maya Flower Garrett. He spends time living in Portugal.

== Discography ==
=== Albums ===
- Grace (2017)
- The Dance & the Wonder (2019)
- Root Down Deep (2021)
- Forward to Zion (2023)
- One Family (2025)

=== Single ===
- "I Am Loving You" (2018)
- "Brave Beautiful Animals" (2019)
- "Light Of Your Grace" (2019)
- "Hummingbird" (2019)
- "Asatoma" (2021)
- "The Dance & The wonder (Mose Remix)" (2021)
- "Mama" (2021)
- "Forward to Zion" (2022)
- "I & I" (2022)
- "Why The Make Us Cry" (2023)

=== EPs ===
- Be Easy (2013)
- Namaste (2014)
- Grace (Acoustics) (Parts 1 and 2) (2016)
- Inside (2020)
