= Bookspot Literatuurprijs =

- Awarded for: Dutch-language literature
- Sponsored by: Stichting Jaarlijkse Literatuurprijs voor fictie en non-fictie
- Location: Amsterdam
- Country: Netherlands, Flemish Belgium
- Reward: €50,000; statuette by Eugène Peters
- First award: 1987
- Final award: Active award
- Website: https://www.bookspotliteratuurprijs.nl/ http://www.akoliteratuurprijs.nl http://www.eciliteratuurprijs.nl

The Bookspot Literatuurprijs (previously ECI Literatuurprijs, AKO Literatuurprijs and Generale Bank Literatuurprijs) is a prize for literature in the Netherlands and Belgium. It is awarded to authors writing in Dutch and amounts to €50,000. The ceremony is televised live each year. The prize was conceived in 1986 and inaugurated the following year with the aim to promote literature and increase the public's interest in books.

== Name and sponsorship ==
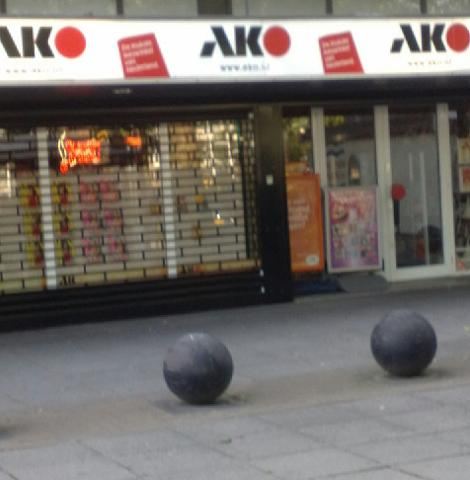
AKO in Amsterdam (2009)

The name of the prize has not been constant, reflecting the main sponsors. It was first prefixed with AKO after its sponsor-founder, the Amsterdamsche Kiosk Onderneming, a chain of over 100 bookstores and newsstands in the Netherlands. From 1997 through 1999 it was sponsored by Belgium's Generale Bank and was named accordingly – Generale Bank Literatuurprijs. The bank was absorbed and the sponsorship presumably assumed by Fortis Bank in 1999, but the financing of the prize reverted to AKO before the 2000 award, so the name Fortis Literatuurprijs was never formally implemented. Beginning in 2015, AKO dropped sponsorship and the prize was sponsored by ECI, a book club and webshop. ECI changed its name in March 2018 to Bookspot, so the literary award had to change as well.

== Selection procedure ==
The Bookspot Literatuurprijs is awarded by a five-member jury of Dutch and Belgian book critics, some of whom have served on it repeatedly. The sixth person, the head of the jury, changes every year and is usually a public figure, often a politician.

The nominations follow the system of a longlist, tiplijst, of 25 preliminary nominees and a shortlist, toplijst, of six finalists. In order to be considered for a given year, a book needs to be published before the first of July of the year in which the prize is to be awarded and after 30 June of the preceding year. The winner is usually announced later in the fall.

The Bookspot award comprehends the categories fiction and non-fiction. Additionally to the jury steered Bookspot Literatuurprijs (50.000 Euro) there is a separate BookSpot Lezersprijs which enables the readers' vote and grants 10.000 Euro to the winner. The process is well-elaborated: thirty books are selected by the general jury, two longlists of 15 books in fiction and non-fiction categories, published online annually any 4 September. Any reader can vote for his favorite books. The three most chosen books form the BookSpot Lezersprijs Top 3. A separate BookSpot Lezersjury of fifty readers read those three books and elect the final Lezersprijs winner.

== Winners ==
- 1987 - J. Bernlef - Publiek geheim
- 1988 - Geerten Meijsing - Veranderlijk en wisselvallig
- 1989 - Brigitte Raskin - Het koekoeksjong
- 1990 - Louis Ferron - Karelische nachten
- 1991 - P. F. Thomése - Zuidland
- 1992 - Margriet de Moor - Eerst grijs dan wit dan blauw
- 1993 - Marcel Möring - Het grote verlangen
- 1994 - Gerhard Durlacher - Quarantine
- 1995 - Connie Palmen - De vriendschap
- 1996 - Frits van Oostrom - Maerlants wereld
- 1997 - A. F. Th. van der Heijden - Onder het plaveisel het moeras
- 1998 - Herman Franke - De verbeelding
- 1999 - Karel Glastra van Loon - De passievrucht
- 2000 - Arnon Grunberg -Fantoompijn
- 2001 - Jeroen Brouwers - Geheime kamers
- 2002 - Allard Schröder - De hydrograaf
- 2003 - Dik van der Meulen - Multatuli: Leven en werk van Eduard Douwes Dekker
- 2004 - Arnon Grunberg - The Asylum Seeker (De asielzoeker)
- 2005 - Jan Siebelink - Knielen op een bed violen
- 2006 - Hans Münstermann - De Bekoring
- 2007 - A. F. Th. van der Heijden - Het schervengericht
- 2008 - Doeschka Meijsing - Over de liefde
- 2009 - Erwin Mortier - Godenslaap
- 2010 - David Van Reybrouck - Congo, een geschiedenis
- 2011 - Marente de Moor - De Nederlandse maagd
- 2012 - Peter Terrin - Post mortem
- 2013 - Joke van Leeuwen - Feest van het begin
- 2014 - Stefan Hertmans - Oorlog en terpentijn
- 2015 - Jeroen Brouwers - Het hout
- 2016 - Martin Michael Driessen - Rivieren
- 2017 - Koen Peeters - De mensengenezer
- 2018 - Tommy Wieringa - De heilige Rita
- 2019 - Wessel te Gussinklo - De hoogstapelaar (fiction); Sjeng Scheijen - De avant-gardisten. De Russische Revolutie in de kunst, 1917-1935 (non-fiction)
- 2020 - Oek de Jong - Zwarte schuur
- 2021 - Wessel te Gussinklo - Op weg naar De Hartz
- 2022 - Anjet Daanje - Het lied van ooievaar en dromedaris
- 2023 - Jan Vantoortelboom - Mauk
- 2024 - Esther Gerritsen - Gebied 19
