= Peter Terrin =

Belgian novelist (born 1968)

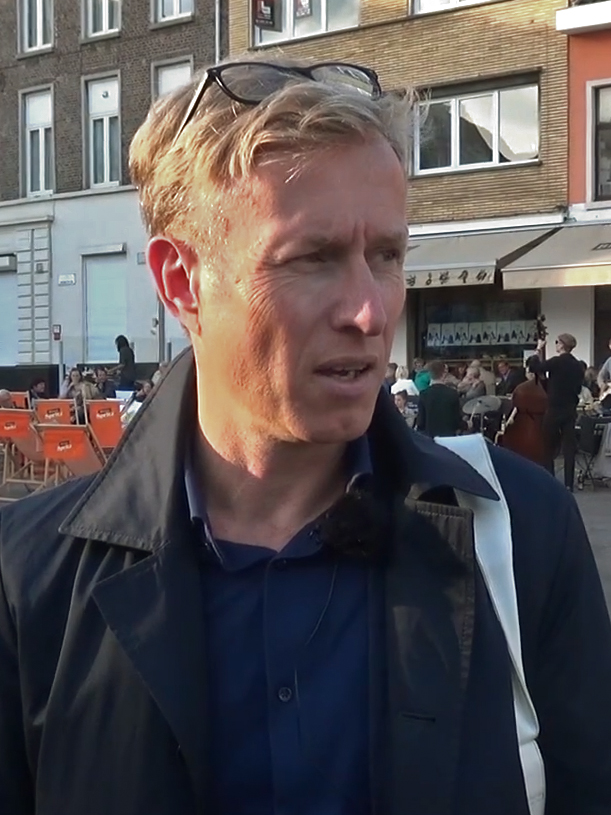
Peter Terrin, (2017)

Peter Terrin (born 3 October 1968) is a Belgian novelist, and a winner of the European Union Prize for Literature. He is the author of several novels and two collections of short stories.

== Biography ==
Terrin's first novel, Kras ("Scratch") was published in 2001, and his 2003 novel Blanco ("Blank"), described as a "Kafka-like reality breakdown" and translated into Swedish in 2006 was his breakthrough. Knack, a Belgian weekly that Terrin blogged for, described Blanco as the best Dutch-language novel about the father-son relationship since Ferdinand Bordewijk's Karakter. His third novel, Vrouwen en kinderen eerst ("Women and Children First") was published in 2004.

Terrin's 2009 novel De bewaker (translated into English in 2012, "The Guard"), called a "coldly beautiful, dystopian allegory" by Eileen Battersby in The Irish Times, won the European Union Prize for Literature in 2010, and his novel Post mortem won the 2012 AKO Literatuurprijs.

Terrin cites Willem Frederik Hermans as an important influence for his minimalist style, and critics have recognized the influence of J. Bernlef in his prose.

== Published books ==
=== Novels ===
- Kras ("Scratch"), 2001
- Blanco ("Blank"), 2003 (trans. into Swedish)
- Vrouwen en kinderen eerst ("Women and Children First"), 2004
- De bewaker ("The Guard"), 2009 (trans. into English, Italian, French, German, Slovenian, Hebrew, Hungarian, Romanian, Serbian, Czech, Bulgarian, Croatian, Catalan)
- Post mortem, 2012
- Monte Carlo, 2014
- Yucca, 2016
- Patricia, 2018
- Al het blauw, 2021

=== Short stories ===
- De code ("The Code"), 1998
- De bijeneters ("The Bee Eaters"), 2006
