= Arnon Grunberg =

Dutch writer

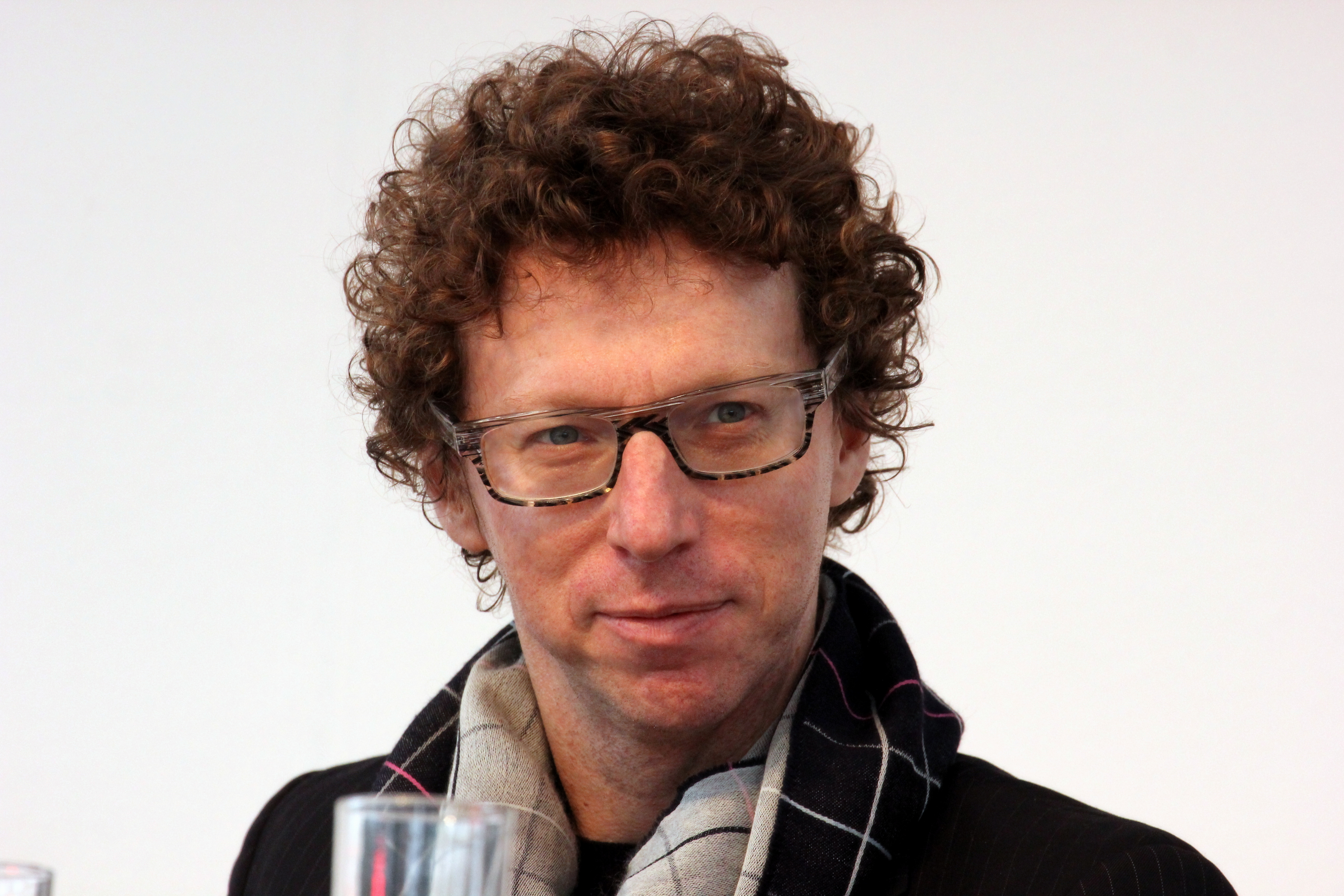
- Grunberg in 2016
- Born: Arnon Yasha Yves Grünberg; 22 February 1971 (age 55); Amsterdam, Netherlands
- Occupation: Author
- Writing career
- Pen name: Marek van der Jagt
- Language: Dutch
- Period: 1993–present
- Genres: Novels, essays, columns
- Notable works: Blue Mondays; Tirza; The Man without Illness
- Notable awards: AKO Literature Prize; Libris Prize; Constantijn Huygens Prize; P.C. Hooft Award
- Website: www.arnongrunberg.com

Arnon Yasha Yves Grünberg (Dutch pronunciation: [ˈɑrnɔ ˈɲɑɕaː iːf ˈxrʏmbɛr(ə)x]; born 22 February 1971) is a Dutch writer of novels, essays, and columns, as well as a journalist. He published some of his work under the heteronym Marek van der Jagt. He lives in New York. His work has been translated into 30 languages. In 2022 he received the PC Hooftprijs, a Dutch literary lifetime achievement award. His most acclaimed and successful novels are Blue Mondays and Tirza. The New York Times called the latter 'grimly comic and unflinching (…) while not always enjoyable, it is never less than enthralling'. Frankfurter Allgemeine Zeitung described him as 'the Dutch Philip Roth'.

== Early life ==
Grunberg was born Arnon Yasha Yves Grünberg on 22 February 1971 in Amsterdam, the Netherlands. He grew up in a family of Jewish immigrants, originally from Germany. His mother was a survivor of the Auschwitz concentration camp. Grunberg attended the Vossius Gymnasium in Amsterdam, but was expelled from the school in 1988. Before publishing his first novel, he held various odd jobs, and tried his hand at acting in a short film by Dutch avant-garde film maker Cyrus Frisch. From 1990 to 1993, Grunberg ran his own publishing house, Kasimir, which was financially unsuccessful.

== Novels ==
Grunberg made his literary debut in 1994 with the novel Blue Mondays (Blauwe maandagen), which won the Anton Wachter Prize for best debut novel. Critics hailed it as a "grotesque comedy, a rarity in Dutch literature." In 2000, he was the first to win this debut prize again, but this time under his heteronym Marek van der Jagt, for the novel The Story of My Baldness (De geschiedenis van mijn kaalheid).

The much-acclaimed novel Tirza, about a father's obsessive love for his graduating daughter, was Grunberg's first novel to be made into a movie, Tirza, in 2010, after winning the Dutch Libris Prize and the Belgian Golden Owl in 2007. This book has been translated into fourteen languages and has received critical acclaim in The New York Times, Los Angeles Times and Le Figaro, among others. A 2010 national poll of literary critics, academics and writers held by the magazine De Groene Amsterdammer elected Tirza as the "most important novel of the 21st century," over Jonathan Littell's The Kindly Ones and Ian McEwan's Saturday. In 2009, Grunberg won the Constantijn Huygens Prize for his entire body of work and in 2011 he received the Frans Kellendonk-prijs.

In September 2008, Grunberg published his seventh novel, Onze Oom (Our Uncle). The story is about a girl who is like a dead person among the living and a major who tries to overcome his shame by leading an insurgent army. Grunberg incorporated his experiences in the army in Afghanistan into this book. Since then, Grunberg has published various novels, including Skin and Hair in 2010 (Huid en Haar), The Man without Illness (De Man Zonder Ziekte) in 2012 and Birthmarks (Moedervlekken) in 2016, which were translated into French and German, among other languages. These books also received considerable acclaim. Le Monde called The Man without Illness 'a wonderful gateway to the work of Arnon Grunberg, [who is] one of the most fascinating writers of his generation'. His work is also available in Portugal, Hungary, Israel, Turkey and Brazil.

== Journalism and essays ==
In addition to his many novels, he has written newspaper and magazine columns, essays, poetry, scenarios and plays. Through his essays, opinion articles and lectures, Arnon Grunberg has made a major contribution to the public debate in international media about issues such as migration policy, discrimination, racism and human trafficking. His essays have appeared in The New York Times, Le Monde, Liberération, The Times, Neue Zürcher Zeitung, Courrier International, Revista Contexto and Süddeutsche Zeitung.

Grunberg is also known for his literary journalism and periods of complete immersion into diverse aspects of society. He has been embedded with Dutch troops in Afghanistan and Iraq, and visited Guantánamo Bay. He has spent time with and written about masseurs at a Romanian resort, patients in a Belgian psychiatric ward, dining-car waiters on a Swiss train, and an ordinary Dutch family on vacation. In 2009 his reports were published in a book called Chambermaids and Soldiers (Kamermeisjes en Soldaten), followed by Slaughters and Psychiatrists (Slachters en Psychiaters) in 2021. The latter contains his reports from 2009 until 2020. Dutch newspaper De Volkskrant praised the book: “Grunberg can not only sketch an unknown world with a few sharp strokes of the pen, but also bring it to vivid life."

Grunberg states he writes because he wants to know 'how people do something like living their life': "Everything is field research: friendship, sex, love, and work. It is only by writing about it that you can escape from it."

== Academic and scientific research ==
In 2008 Grunberg became a writer-in-residence and guest lecturer at the Leiden University and Wageningen University and Research Centre. In October 2014, he became an honorary fellow at the Faculty of Arts of the University of Amsterdam. His lectures focused on issues related to privacy and surveillance, and together with his students, he developed a video game. The lecture series coincided with an exhibit on the author's life and work, the materials for which were sourced from his literary archives, which were on loan to the university library's Special Collections department, making them a unique, "living" archive.

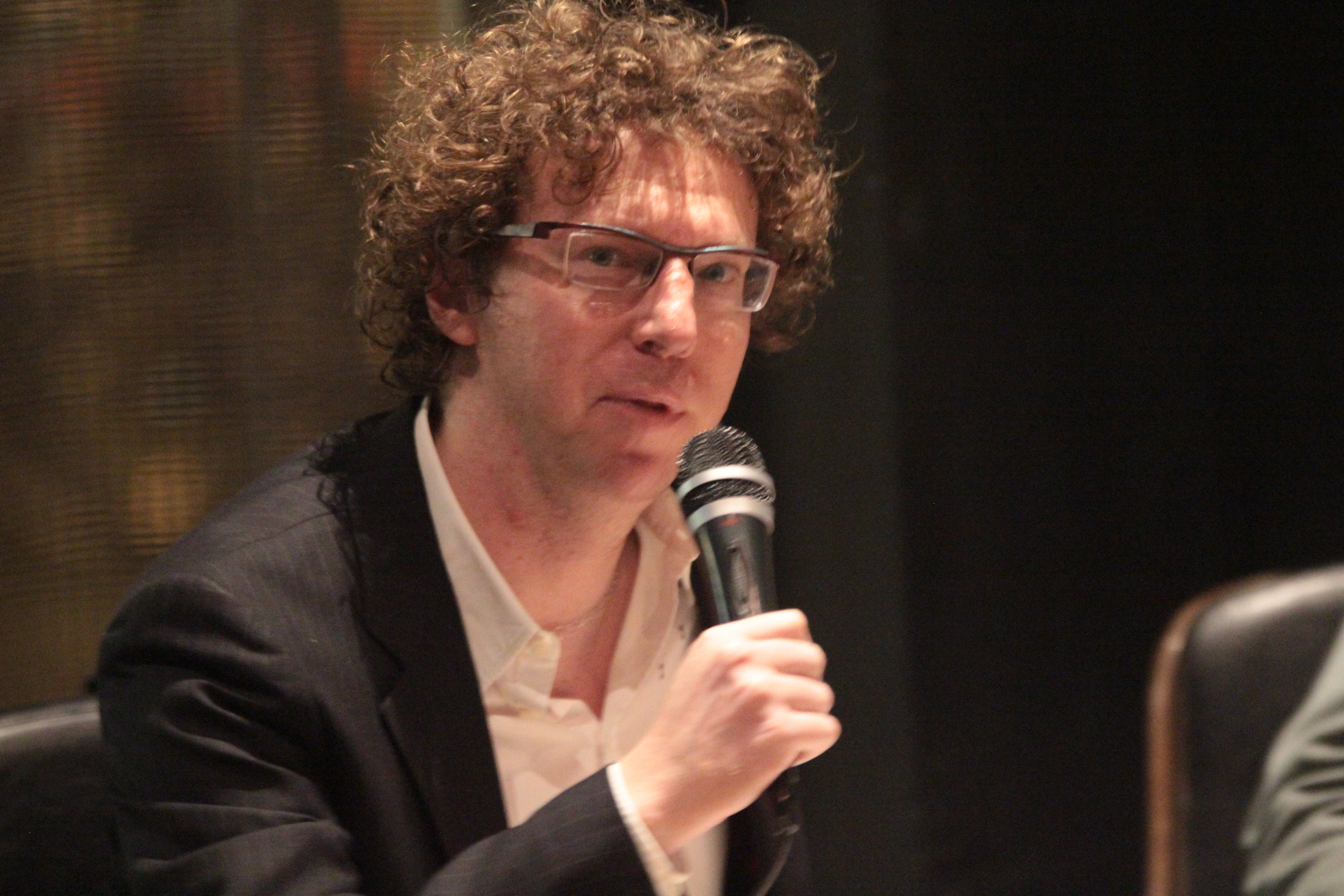
Arnon Grunberg in 2015

In an attempt to understand the creative process, Grunberg wrote his latest novel Het Bestand (which, in Dutch, can refer to both a computer file and a truce) while scientists were measuring his brain activity, emotions, and subjective feelings. Using screen capture and physiological measurements such as EEG, GSR and ECG, and subjective questionnaires for the author, scientists correlated the writing of emotionally charged passages with physiological activity. The second stage of the experiment took place in October and November 2015 in the GrunbergLab at the University of Amsterdam, where volunteers' brain activity was measured while they were reading the novel in a controlled environment.

== Awards ==
- 1994 Anton Wachter Prize for Blauwe maandagen
- 1996 Gouden Ezelsoor for Blauwe maandagen
- 2000 Anton Wachter Prize for De geschiedenis van mijn kaalheid as Marek van der Jagt
- 2000 AKO Literature Prize for Fantoompijn
- 2002 Golden Owl Literature Prize for De mensheid zij geprezen
- 2004 AKO Literature Prize for The Asylum Seeker (De Asielzoeker)
- 2004 Ferdinand Bordewijk Prize for The Asylum Seeker (De Asielzoeker)
- 2007 Golden Owl Literature Prize for Tirza
- 2007 Libris Prize for Tirza
- 2009 Constantijn Huygens Prize for his entire oeuvre
- 2017 Gouden Ganzenveer
- 2021 P.C. Hooft Award for "his enormous contribution to Dutch Literature"
- 2022 Johannes Vermeer Award

== Selected bibliography ==
Novels

- (1994) Blauwe maandagen; English translation: Blue Mondays (1997)
- (1997) Figuranten; English translation: Silent Extras (2001)
- (1998) De heilige Antonio (The Saint of the Impossible)
- (2000) Fantoompijn; English translation: Phantom Pain (2004)
- (2000) De geschiedenis van mijn kaalheid as Marek van der Jagt; English translation: The Story of My Baldness (2004)
- (2001) De Mensheid zij geprezen, Lof der Zotheid 2001 (Praised be Mankind, Praise of Folly 2001)
- (2002) Gstaad 95–98 as Marek van der Jagt
- (2003) De asielzoeker (The Asylum Seeker)
- (2004) De joodse messias; English translation: The Jewish Messiah (2008)
- (2006) Tirza; English translation: Tirza (2013)
- (2008) Onze oom (Our Uncle)
- (2010) Huid en Haar (Tooth and Nail)
- (2012) De man zonder ziekte (The Man Without Illness)
- (2015) Het bestand (The Cache)
- (2016) Moedervlekken (Birthmarks)
- (2018) Goede Mannen
- (2020) Bezette Gebieden
- (2021) De dood in Taormina

Stories

- (2001) Amuse-Gueule; English translation: Amuse-Bouche (2008)
- (2004) Grunberg rond de wereld (Grunberg Around the World)
- (2009) Kamermeisjes & Soldaten: Arnon Grunberg onder de mensen (Chambermaids & Soldiers: Arnon Grunberg Among the People)
- (2013) Apocalyps

Essays

- (1998) Troost van de slapstick (The Comfort of Slapstick)
- (2001) Monogaam (Monogamous), as Marek van der Jagt
- (2001) Otto Weininger Of bestaat de jood? (Otto Weininger or Does the Jew Exist?), as Marek van der Jagt
- (2013) Buster Keaton lacht nooit (Buster Keaton Never Laughs)
- (2013) Why the Dutch Love Black Pete

Filmscript

- (1998) Het 14e kippetje (The 14th Chicken)

Plays

- (1998) You are also very attractive when you are dead
- (2005) De Asielzoeker (The Asylum Seeker), adapted by Koen Tachelet
- (2015) Hoppla, wir sterben, premiere 29. April 2015, Münchner Kammerspiele
