= Stefan Hertmans =

Belgian poet

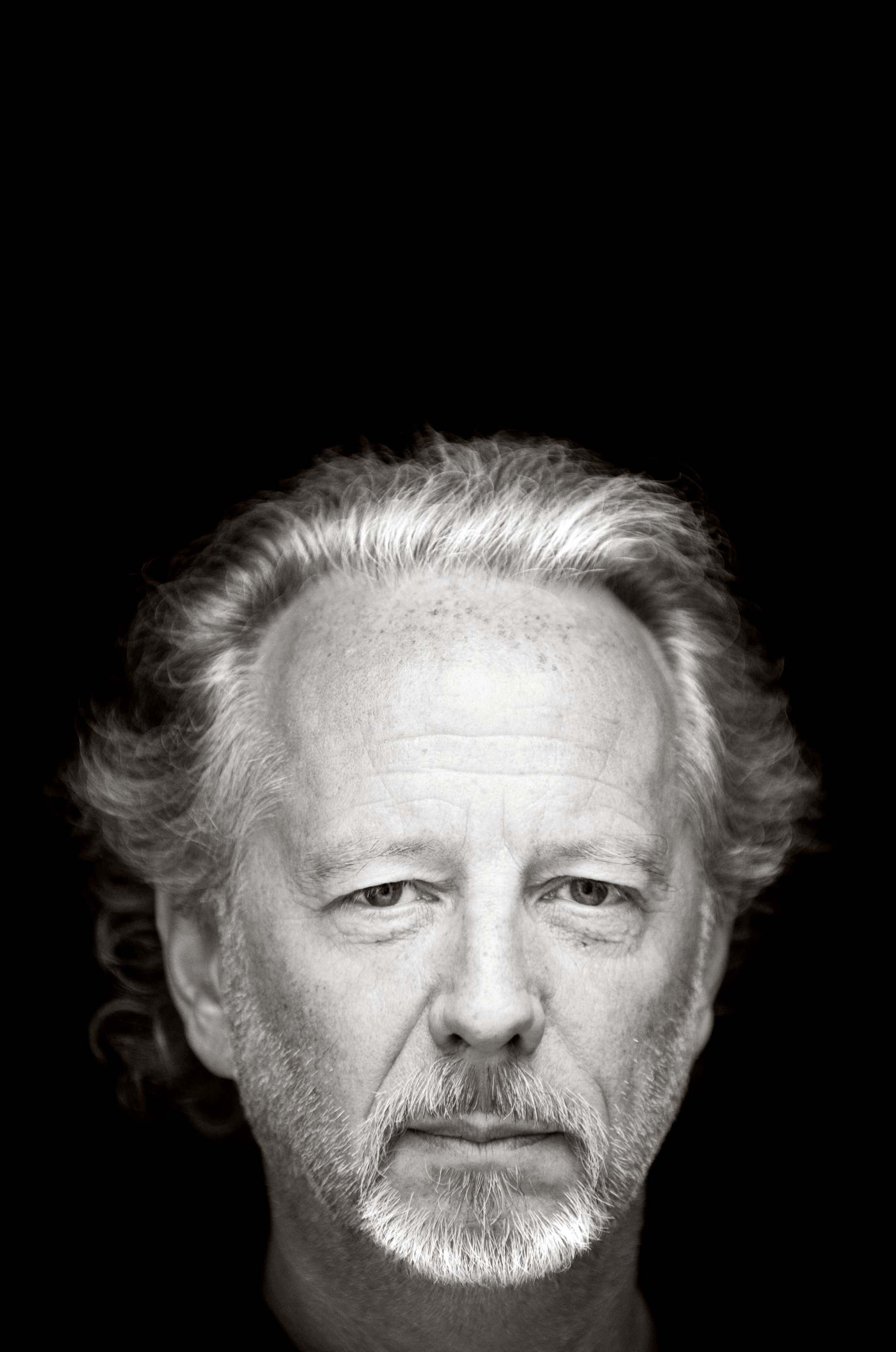
Stefan Hertmans, 2010

Stefan Hertmans (born 1951 in Ghent, Belgium) is a Flemish Belgian writer. He was head of a study centre at University College Ghent and affiliated researcher of the Ghent University. He won the Ferdinand Bordewijk Prijs in 2002 for the novel Als op de eerste dag.

== Work ==
Hertmans published six novels, two-story collections, six essay books and twelve collections of poetry.

- Gestolde Wolken (Frozen Clouds, 1986), won Hertmans the Multatuli-prize of the city of Amsterdam.
- His volume of poems Bezoekingen (Visitations, 1988), won the Arch-prize of the Free Word and the tri-annual Prize of the Flemish Provinces.
- The title story of De grenzen van woestijnen (Borders of deserts, 1988), was translated into English and published in The Review of contemporary Fiction (Illinois) (summer 1994); British author Rupert Thomson took the motto for his novel The book of Revelation from this story.
- In 1994 the Kaaitheater in Brussels took up Hertmans' first play, Kopnaad (Suture, 1990); it was directed by Jan Ritsema. This production was staged for the Theaterfestival 1995 and then in various cities in Flanders and Holland. Fischer Verlag Frankfurt published the German edition, which was turned into a Berlin radio play in 1997.
- To Merelbeke (1994), a novel described as an ironical "autobiographical lie" about a Flemish youth, was widely praised and nominated for the Libris prize and the ECI prize. A German translation was published in 1996 (Amselbach, Kiepenheuer Verlag Leipzig).
- Muziek voor de overtocht (Music for the crossing, 1994), a volume of five long poems on Paul Hindemith, Paul Valéry, Paul Cézanne, Vaslav Nijinsky and Wallace Stevens, won the Belgian State prize for poetry 1995.
- Steden – verhalen onderweg (1998), a novel in an autobiographical key, relates Hertmans' impressions of European cities such as Dresden, Tübingen, Trieste, Bratislava, and Marseille. The book was nominated for the Generale Bank-prijs (former & later AKO). Reaktion Books, London, published a translation of this book in 2001 entitled Intercities. A French translation was published by Le Castor Astral in 2003 (Entre Ville); it won the Prix La Ville à Lire/France culture.
- Goya als Hond, a volume of poetry, was awarded the 'Maurice Gilliams Prize 2002'. One of the poems won the prize for the best poem of 1999.
- 'As on the first day' ('Als op de eerste dag') (2001), was nominated for the AKO-Prize, and was awarded the 'Ferdinand Bordewijk' Prize by the Jan Campert Foundation. This novel was published in French as Comme au premier jour by Christian Bourgois ed., Paris, in 2003.
- In 2000, Hertmans wrote a philosophical reflection on the obscene in contemporary imagination, called Het Bedenkelijke. His publishers released it as part of a series, with books by Peter Sloterdijk, Jacques Derrida, Slavoj Zizek.

Hertmans wrote a second theatre play For the Brussels Kaaitheater, about the obsessive power of women in Greek tragedies (Antigone, Clytaemnestra, Medea). In autumn 2001, it became a stage production by Toneelgroep Amsterdam with Gerard-Jan Rijnders. (Mind the Gap, Meulenhoff 2000).

- His compendium of essays on theatre, Het zwijgen van de tragedie (The silence of tragedy, 2007), won the Five Year Prize for Essay from the Royal Academy for Dutch Linguistics and Literature (KANTL). Spanish translation 'El Silencio de la Tragedia' was published by Pre-Textos in 2009.

=== Other works ===
- Borders of Deserts, short story in The Review of contemporary Fiction, Summer 1994, Illinois USA.
- The Tail of the Magpie, short story, and selection of poems in The literary review, 1997, Madison USA.
- Poems in Modern Poetry in translation, selection of twenty poems translated by Theo Hermans, Yann Lovelock e.o., London winter 1997
- 'Marsyas', in Grand Street 70, spring 2002, New York
- Poems in New European Poets, Ed. Wayne Miller & Kevin Prufer, Graywolf Minnesota 2008
- Anne Marie Musschoot, The courage of the critical intellect, essay followed by extracts and poems, in The Low Countries, Arts and society in Flanders and the Netherlands, Yearbook 1997–1998, p. 178–186.

== Bibliography ==
- Ruimte. Novel. Gent, Van Hyfte, 1981
- Ademzuil. Poetry. Gent, Grijm, 1984.
- Melksteen. Poetry. Gent, Poëziecentrum, 1986.
- Gestolde wolken. Short stories. Amsterdam/Leuven, Meulenhoff/Kritak, 1987.
- Zoutsneeuw. Elegieën. Poetry. Amsterdam/Leuven, Meulenhoff/Kritak, 1987.
- Bezoekingen. Poetry. Amsterdam/Leuven, Meulenhoff/Kritak, 1988.
- Oorverdovende steen. Essays about literature. Essays. Antwerpen/Amsterdam, Manteau, 1988.
- De grenzen van woestijnen. Short stories. Amsterdam/Leuven, Meulenhoff/Kritak, 1989.
- Sneeuwdoosjes. Essays. Amsterdam/Leuven, Meulenhoff, Kritak, 1989.
- Het narrenschip. Poetry. Gent, Poëziecentrum, 1990.
- Verwensingen. Poetry. Amsterdam/Leuven, Meulenhoff/Kritak, 1991.
- Kopnaad. Poetry; drama. Amsterdam/Leuven, Meulenhoff/ Kritak, 1992.
- Muziek voor de overtocht. Poetry. Amsterdam/Leuven, Meulenhoff/Kritak, 1994.
- Naar Merelbeke. Novel. Amsterdam/Leuven, Meulenhoff/ Kritak, 1994.
- Fuga’s en pimpelmezen. Over actualiteit, kunst en kritiek. Essays. Amsterdam/Leuven, Meulenhoff/Kritak, 1995.
- Francesco’s paradox. Poems. Amsterdam/Leuven, Meulenhoff/Kritak, 1995.
- Annunciaties. Poems. Amsterdam, Meulenhoff, 1997.
- Steden. Verhalen onderweg. Prose. Amsterdam/Leuven, Meulenhoff/Kritak, 1998.
- Het bedenkelijke. Over het obscene in de cultuur. Essays. Amsterdam, Boom, 1999.
- Waarover men niet spreken kan : elementen voor een agogiek van de kunst. Brussel, VUBPress, 1999.
- Goya als hond. Poetry. Amsterdam, Meulenhoff, 1999.
- Mind the gap. Drama. Amsterdam, Meulenhoff, 2000.
- Café Aurora. Essays; with the work of artist Jan Vanriet. Breda, De Geus, 2000.
- Als op de eerste dag. Roman in verhalen. Novel. Amsterdam, Meulenhoff, 2001.
- Het putje van Milete. Essays. Amsterdam, Meulenhoff, 2002.
- Engel van de metamorfose. Over het werk van Jan Fabre. Amsterdam, Meulenhoff, 2002.
- Vuurwerk zei ze. Gedichten. Poetry. Amsterdam, Meulenhoff, 2003.
- Harder dan sneeuw. Novel. Amsterdam, Meulenhoff, 2004.
- Kaneelvingers. Poetry. Amsterdam, De Bezige Bij, 2005.
- Jullie die weten. Drama. Gent, Poëziecentrum, 2005.
- Muziek voor de overtocht. Gedichten 1975–2005. Poetry. Amsterdam, De Bezige Bij, 2006.
- Het zwijgen van de tragedie. Essays. Amsterdam, De Bezige Bij, 2007.
- Het Verborgen Weefsel. Novel. Amsterdam, De Bezige Bij, 2009.
- Waarover men niet spreken kan, Grondslagen voor een agogiek van de kunst. Gent, Academia Press 2010.
- De val van vrije dagen. Poetry. Amsterdam, De Bezige bij, 2010.
- De mobilisatie van Arcadia. Essays. Amsterdam, De Bezige Bij, 2011.
- Oorlog en terpentijn. Novel. Amsterdam, De Bezige Bij, 2013. (Published in English as War and Turpentine.)
- De bekeerlinge. Novel. Amsterdam, De Bezige Bij, 2016.
- De opgang. Novel. Amsterdam, De Bezige Bij, 2020. (Published in English as The Ascent.)

== Awards ==
- 1989 – Arkprijs van het Vrije Woord for Bezoekingen
- 1995 – Belgian State Prize for Poetry for Muziek voor de Overtocht
- 2002 – Ferdinand Bordewijk Prijs for Als op de eerste dag
- 2014 – AKO Literatuurprijs for Oorlog en terpentijn

== See also ==
- Flemish literature
