= Jaap Robben =

Dutch writer (born 1984)

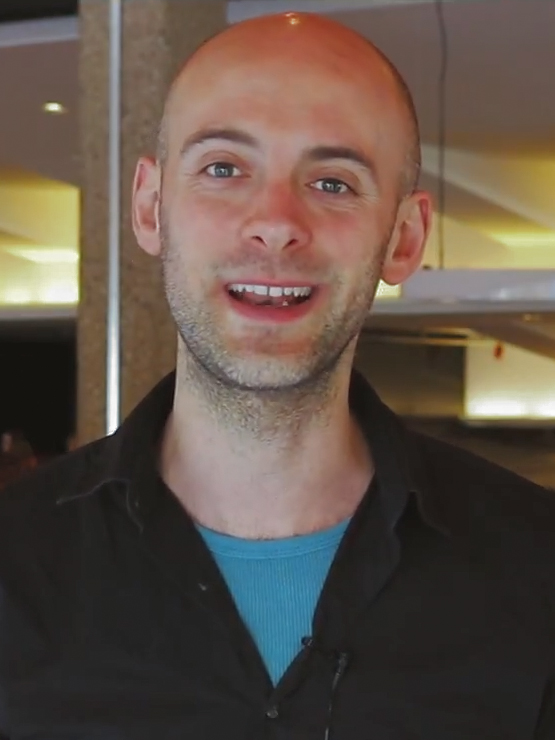
Jaap Robben 15-3-2017

Jaap Robben (born 1984) is a Dutch writer. An acclaimed author of children's books, he published his debut novel for adults Birk in 2014. The book was a bestseller in the Netherlands where it won several awards. The book has been translated into English by David Doherty.

== Selected works ==
- Twee vliegen (Two Flies, 2004)
- De nacht krekelt (The Night is Full of Crickets, 2007)
- Zullen we een bos beginnen? (Shall We Start a Wood?, 2008, shortlisted for the Gouden Uil for Children’s Literature)
- De Zuurtjes (The Sourballs, 2010)
- Als iemand ooit mijn botjes vindt (If Anyone Finds My Bones, 2012).
- Birk (2014, translated as You Have Me to Love. Winner of the Dioraphte Prize, the ANV Debut Prize, etc.)
