= Geerten Meijsing =

Dutch writer

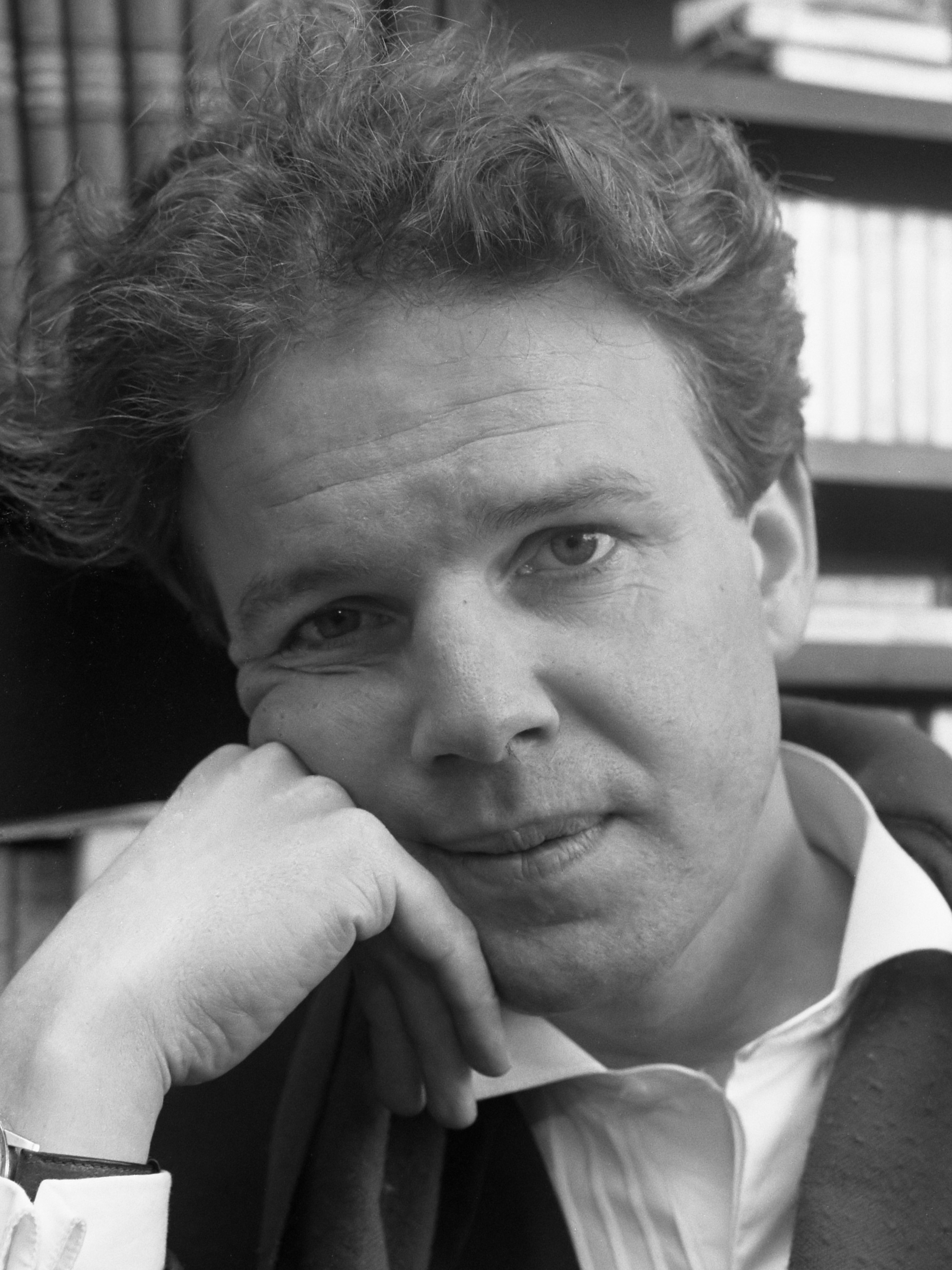
Geerten Meijsing (1988)

Geerten Jan Maria Meijsing (born 9 August 1950) is a Dutch writer, translator and novelist. He won the AKO Literatuurprijs in 1988 for his novel Veranderlijk en wisselvallig (Fickle and Changeable), and in 1999 the Gouden Uil Literatuurprijs for his novel Tussen mes en keel (Between Knife and Throat). He published most of his early books under the pseudonym Joyce & Co, notably a trilogy devoted to literature, painting, and music (Erwin, Michael van Mander, and Cecilia).

Geerten Meijsing is the younger brother of novelist Doeschka Meijsing.

== Works ==
- 1975 - Erwin (written under pseudonym Joyce & Co)
- 1979 - Michael van Mander (written under pseudonym Joyce & Co)
- 1981 - Een meisjesleven (A Girl's Life; written under pseudonym Eefje Wijnberg)
- 1982 - Erwins echo (Erwin's Echo; written under pseudonym Joyce & Co)
- 1982 - Venetiaanse brieven en Calabrese dagboeken (Venetian Letters and Calabrian Diaries; written under pseudonym Joyce & Co)
- 1982 - Werkbrieven 1968-1981 (Working Correspondence; with Kees Snel and Frans Verpoorten; written under pseudonym Joyce & Co)
- 1986 - Cecilia (written under pseudonym Joyce & Co)
- 1986 - De koffer (The Suitcase)
- 1987 - Veranderlijk en wisselvallig (Fickle and Changeable)
- 1991 - Altijd de vrouw (Always the Woman)
- 1992 - De grachtengordel (Inner Circles)
- 1993 - De palmen van Amsterdam (Palmtrees in Amsterdam; with Kester Freriks)
- 1995 - De ongeschreven leer (The Unwritten Doctrine)
- 1997 - Tussen mes en keel (Between Knife and Throat)
- 1999 - Kerstnacht in de kathedraal (Christmas Night in the Cathedral)
- 2000 - Dood meisje (Dead Girl)
- 2000 - Stucwerk (Stucco)
- 2003 - Malocchio
- 2005 - Moord & Doodslag (Murder and Manslaughter; with Doeschka Meijsing)
- 2006 - Stukwerk (Piecework)
- 2007 - Siciliaanse vespers (Sicilian Vespers)
- 2009 - De grote snelle schepen: enkele reis (The Large and Fast Ships: Single Journey)
- 2016 - Brieven aan Nanne Tepper (Letters to Nanne Tepper)
