= Lieve Joris =

Belgian writer

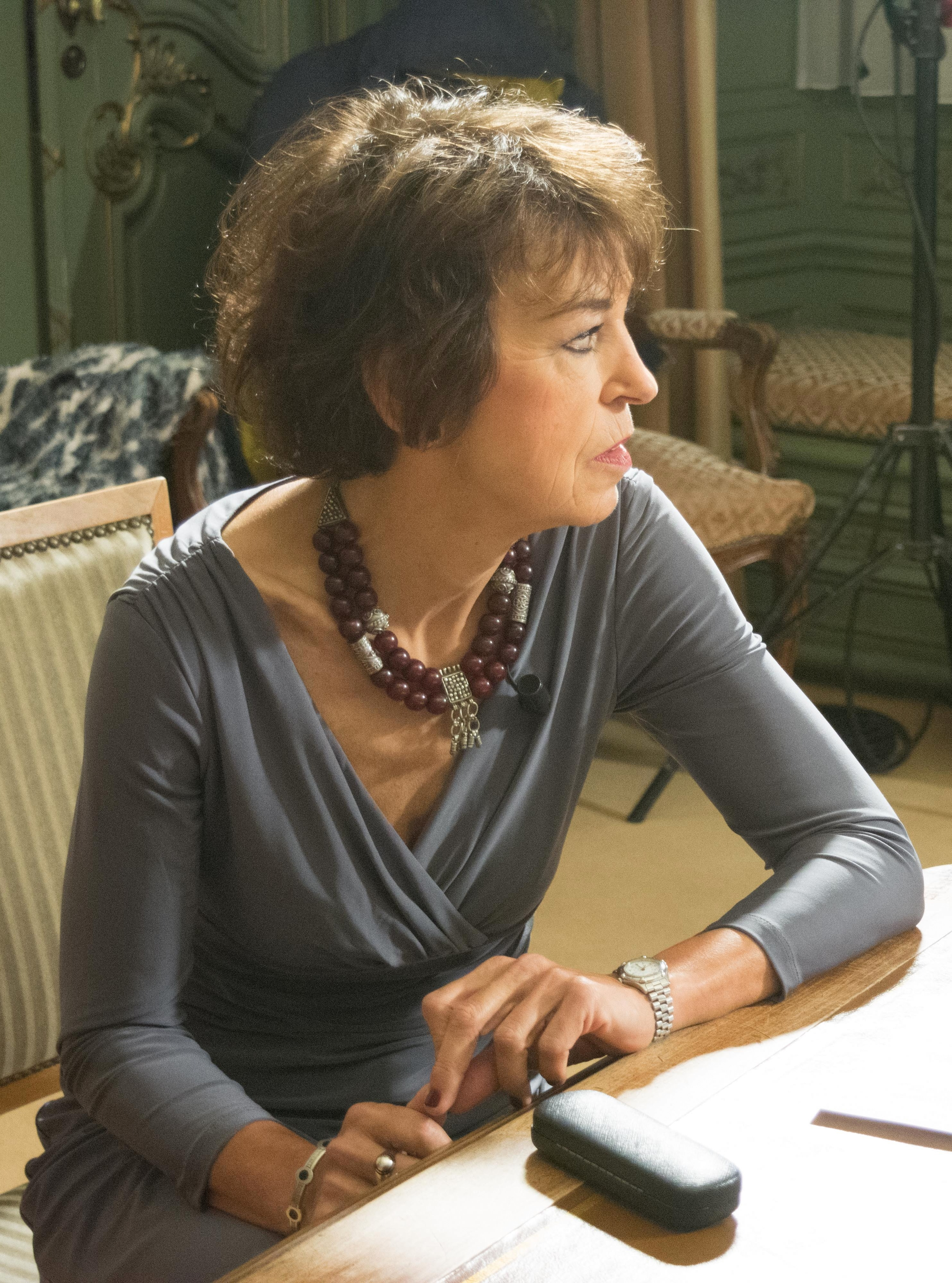
Lieve Joris (2015)

Lieve Joris (born 1953) is a Belgian non-fiction writer on the Middle East, Eastern Europe, Africa and China.

== Biography ==
Joris was born in Belgium. After a year of studying psychology in Leuven and two years in the United States, working as an au pair and exploring the country, Joris settled in the Netherlands where she studied journalism at the School of Journalism in Utrecht. She worked for several Dutch newspapers and magazines and debuted as a writer with De Golf (The Gulf, 1986).

In 1985 she travelled to the former Belgian colony of Congo, where her great-uncle had been a missionary. Congo became a recurring theme in her work, leading successively to Terug naar Congo (Back to the Congo, 1987), Dans van de luipaard (The Leopard's Dance, 2001), Het uur van de rebellen (The Rebels' Hour, 2006) and De hoogvlaktes (The High Plains, 2008). The Rebels' Hour was published in the US by Grove Atlantic and was nominated for the T.R. Fyvel Book Award. Paul Theroux wrote: "Much more than a portrait of a Congolese herd boy who becomes an important military man, The Rebels’ Hour is the portrait of a vast and chaotic country in a state of near-anarchy. I have long admired Ms. Joris's African books, but this one is both powerful and timely, intensely imagined." The Daily Telegraph called it "an intelligent and at times beautiful reckoning of one of the great human dramas of our age", Philip Gourevitch selected it in The New Yorker as one of four essential books on Rwanda. The French daily Libération hailed her as "one of the best journalists in the world", adding: "Lieve Joris has that rare ability to follow both paths, the general and the particular, the panorama and the close-up, the analysis and the narrative, without ever losing track of either." The French edition of The High Plains was awarded the Prix Nicolas Bouvier. An excerpt of this book was published in the winter 2009 issue of The Paris Review

For Mali Blues (1996), the account of her travels through Senegal, Mauritania and Mali, Joris received the Belgian Triennial award for Flemish prose (1999) and the French Prix de l'Astrolabe.

Joris has also written several books about the Middle East. After her debut The Gulf she published Een kamer in Cairo (A Room in Cairo, 1991) and De poorten van Damascus (The Gates of Damascus, 1993).

In 2010 Mijn Afrikaanse telefooncel (My African Telephone Booth) was published: short stories about Africa, the Middle East and Eastern Europe – the three focus points of Joris' work.

Years after her first trip to Congo, Joris became interested in the relationship between Africa and China. For her book Op de vleugels van de draak (On the Wings of the Dragon, 2013), Joris travelled between Africa and China, immersing herself in the world of Africans and Chinese who venture into each other's territory in the slipstream of big business contracts. In 2014 Lieve Joris was awarded the Spiegelprijs for her Africa-books and the VPRO Bob den Uyl Prijs (Best Dutch travel book) for On The Wings of The Dragon. "She went behind the scenes of globalization and discovered a world of which we don't have a clue," the French weekly L'Express wrote. The French daily Libération called it "the intimate traces of her itineraries and pursuits".

In her memoir Terug naar Neerpelt (Back to Neerpelt, 2018), Joris returns to the Flemish countryside where she grew up as the middle child of a turbulent family of nine. "She has honored the paradise of her youth and did not steer clear of the snakes," the Dutch writer Maarten Asscher noted. Libération wrote: "Lieve Joris publishes a remarkable family story, interwoven with miniatures and anecdotes, about the wild life and tragic fate of an older brother who was both admired and cursed." The French Le Point commented: "At first it makes you somewhat dizzy, what a family, but as you read on, everything tightens on the dark trajectory of her brother, a seductive, talented and destructive angel. And to everyone's question: how to escape him without abandoning him?"

Joris' books have been translated into English, French, German, Spanish, Catalan, Norwegian, Hungarian and Polish. She lives in Amsterdam.

== Bibliography ==
- 1987 – Terug naar Congo
- 1990 – De melancholieke revolutie
- 1991 – Een kamer in Cairo
- 1992 – Zangeres op Zanzibar en andere reisverhalen
- 1993 – De poorten van Damascus
- 1996 – Mali blues
- 2001 – Dans van de luipaard
- 2006 – Het uur van de rebellen
- 2008 – De hoogvlaktes
- 2010 – Mijn Afrikaanse telefooncel
- 2013 – Op de vleugels van de draak
- 2018 – Terug naar Neerpelt

== English translations ==
- Back to the Congo (Macmillan, London, 1992; Atheneum, New York, 1992)
- The Gates of Damascus (Lonely Planet, Australia, 1996)
- Mali Blues (Lonely Planet, Australia, 1998)
- The Rebels' Hour (Grove-Atlantic, US; 2008; Atlantic, UK, 2008)

== Awards ==
- 1993 – Henriette Roland Holst-prijs (The Netherlands) for The Melancholic Revolution
- 1999 – Cultuurprijs van de Vlaamse Gemeenschap (Belgium) for Mali Blues
- 1999 – Prix de l'Astrolabe (France) for Mali Blues
- 2003 – Cultuurprijs van de provincie Limburg (Belgium) for her entire work
- 2009 – Prix Nicolas Bouvier (France) for The High Plains
- 2010 – Knight of the Order of Arts and Letters (France)
- 2014 – VPRO Bob den Uyl Prijs (The Netherlands) for On The Wings of The Dragon
- 2014 – Spiegelprijs (Belgium) for her Africa-books (Belgium)
- 2019 – Confituur Publieksprijs (Belgium) for Terug naar Neerpelt
