= Margriet de Moor =

Dutch pianist and writer

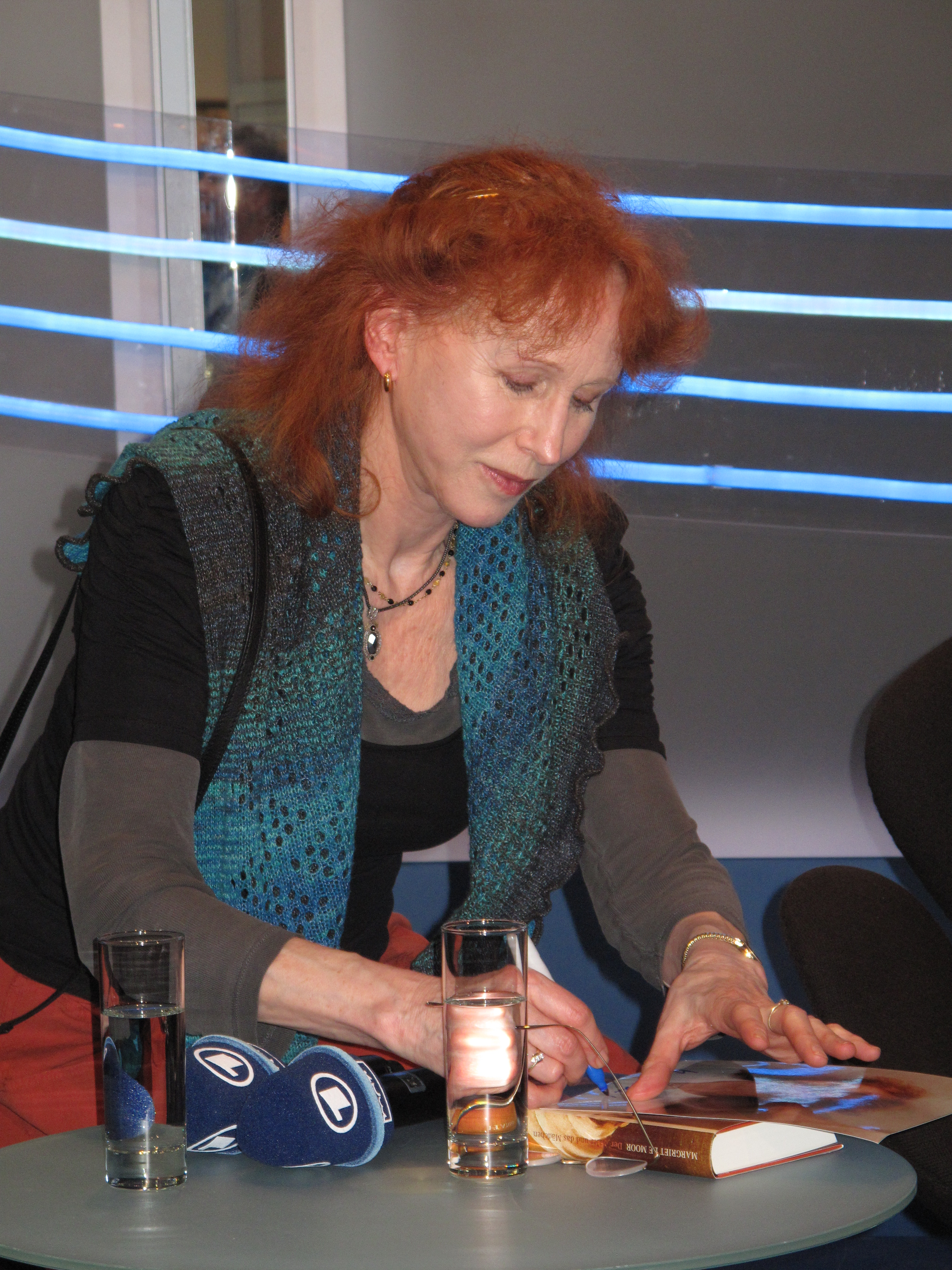
- Margriet de Moor in 2011
- Born: Margaretha Maria Antonetta Neefjes; 1941 (age 84–85); Noordwijk, Netherlands
- Education: Royal Conservatory of The Hague; University of Amsterdam
- Occupations: Pianist, writer
- Writing career
- Language: Dutch
- Notable awards: AKO Literatuurprijs (1992)

Margaretha Maria Antonetta "Margriet" de Moor (née Neefjes; born 1941) is a Dutch pianist and writer of novels and essays. She won the AKO Literatuurprijs for her novel Eerst grijs dan wit dan blauw (1991).

== Life and career ==
Margaretha Maria Antonetta Neefjes was born in Noordwijk on 21 November 1941, and was married sculptor Heppe de Moor (1938 – 1992). They had two daughters: writer Marente and visual artist Lara. After junior high and the Hogere Burgerschool she attended the Royal Conservatory of The Hague, where she studied piano and singing. Afterward she studied art history and archeology in Amsterdam and taught piano. With her husband, she began an artist salon in 1984 in 's-Graveland.

De Moor began writing, and after a failed attempt at a novel, debuted with a story collection, Op de rug gezien; the collection won her a literary award, the Gouden Ezelsoor, and a nomination for the AKO Literatuurprijs. Many of her works have been translated into German.

== Literary awards ==
- 1989 – Gouden Ezelsoor, nomination for AKO Literatuurprijs for Op de rug gezien
- 1990 – Lucy B. and C.W. van der Hoogt Prize for Dubbelportret
- 1992 – AKO Literatuurprijs for Eerst grijs dan wit dan blauw

== Published works ==
- Op de rug gezien (stories, 1988)
- Dubbelportret (novellas, 1989)
- Eerst grijs dan wit dan blauw (novel, 1991)
- De virtuoos (novel, 1993)
- Ik droom dus (stories, 1995)
- Hertog van Egypte (novel, 1996)
- Zee-Binnen (novel, 1999)
- Verzamelde verhalen (stories, 2000)
- Kreutzersonate - Een liefdesverhaal (novel, 2001)
- Ze waren schoolmeesters (biography, 2001)
- De verdronkene (novel, 2005)
- De Kegelwerper (novel, 2006)
- Als een hond zijn blinde baas (essays, 2007)
- De schilder en het meisje (novel, 2010)
- De verdronkene (novel, 2010)
- Mélodie d'amour (novel, 2013)
