= Philip and the Others =

1954 novel by Cees Nooteboom

- 1956 edition
- Author: Cees Nooteboom
- Original title: Phillip en de anderen
- Translator: Adrienne Dixon
- Language: Dutch
- Publisher: Querido
- Publication date: 1955
- Publication place: Netherlands
- English publication date: 1988
- Media type: Print
- Pages: 165
- Awards: Anne Frank Prize

Philip and the Others (Dutch: Philip en de anderen) is a 1955 novel by Dutch writer Cees Nooteboom. It was Nooteboom's first novel. He wrote the first chapter when working in a bank, sent it to a publisher, and was offered 300 guilders to finish the book, which then took two months. The book won the Anne Frank Prize.

== See also ==
- 1955 in literature
- Dutch literature
