= Max van Rooy =

Dutch writer (1942–2022)

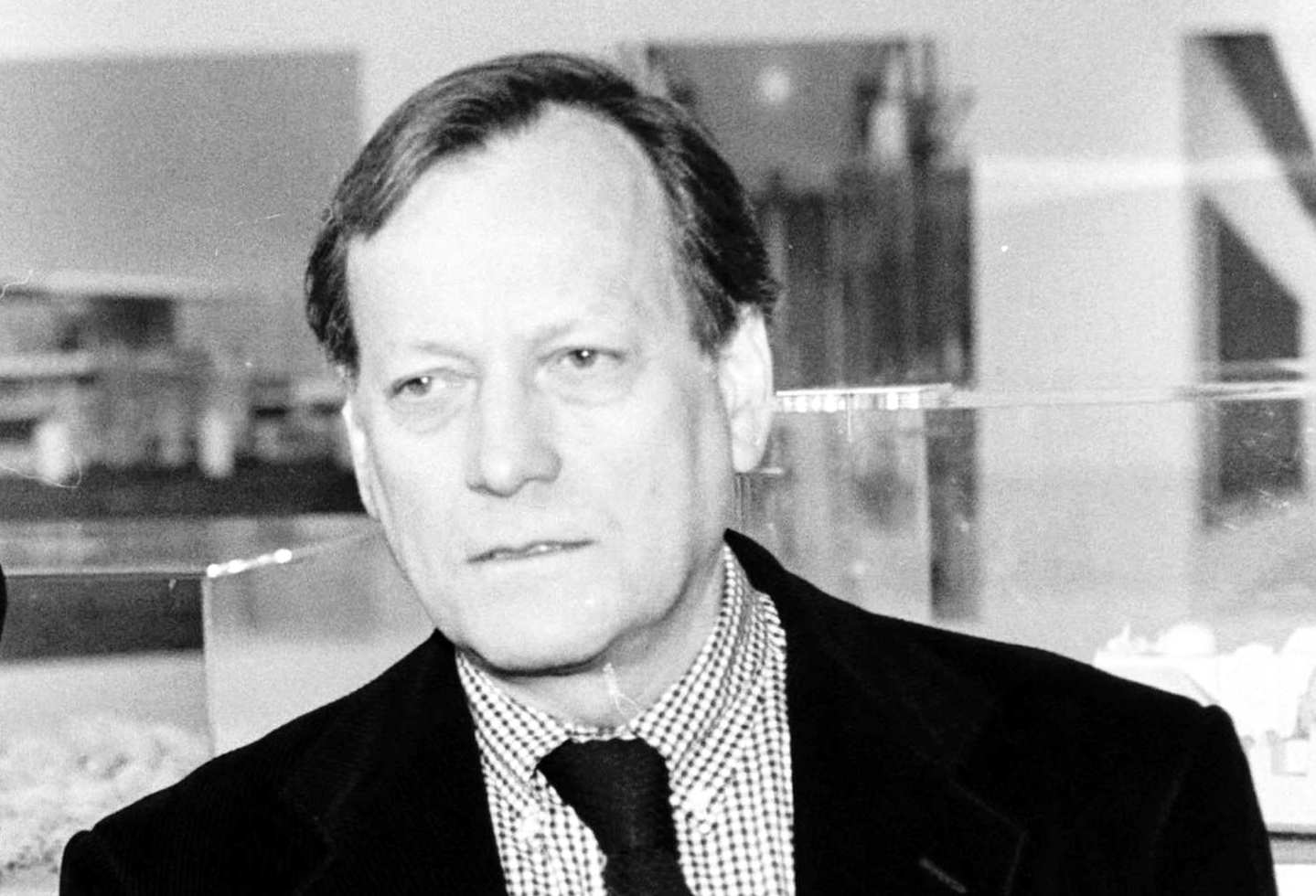
- Max van Rooy, 1997
- Born: 25 March 1942; Voorburg, German-occupied Netherlands
- Died: 8 December 2022 (aged 80); Amsterdam
- Occupation(s): Writer and journalist

Max van Rooy (25 March 1942 – 8 December 2022) was a Dutch writer and journalist.

== Biography ==
Van Rooy grew up in the region of The Hague where he attended primary school Passchalischool (1948-1954) and secondary school Aloysius College (1954-1961). He started studying cultural anthropology at the University of Amsterdam with professor André Köbben, but stopped after three months because he wanted to start writing and drawing. After school he had to do military service, and did that in the Royal Netherlands Air Force. After the end of his military service after two years van Rooy chose to become an artist in Greece. Once back in the Netherlands, he settled in Amsterdam and became friends with writers K. Schippers, J. Bernlef and Gerard Brands..

Van Rooy was from 1966 to 1970 editor of newspaper Algemeen Handelsblad. Afterwards the editor of the Saturday edition of NRC Handelsblad. In 1976 he became editor-in-chief of the cultural magazine Hollands Diep. In 1979 he returned to the NRC Handelsblad and became deputy editor-in-chief and architecture critic. In 1995 those positions changed to cultural commentator and architecture critic. He retired in 2010.

Van Rooy was also a writer and wrote multiple books. The last book he published was a biography about his grandfather architect Hendrik Petrus Berlage of the period until 1914. The book shows he played a key role in the early 20th-century. With intervals it took him 44 years to write the book.

Van Rooy died on 8 December 2022, at the age of 80.
