= Rituals (novel) =

1980 novel by Cees Nooteboom

- First edition (Dutch)
- Author: Cees Nooteboom
- Original title: Rituelen
- Translator: Adrienne Dixon
- Language: Dutch
- Publisher: De Arbeiderspers
- Publication date: 1980
- Publication place: Netherlands
- English publication date: 1983
- Pages: 189
- ISBN: 90-295-3262-9

Rituals (Dutch: Rituelen) is a 1980 novel by Dutch writer Cees Nooteboom.

The novel's narrative follows two friends, one who breaks rules frequently and one who follows them strictly. It was Nooteboom's first novel in 17 years. After finishing The Knight Has Died (1963), he had worked as a journalist, written poetry, and traveled around the world, "looking for something to write about".

Rituals won the Ferdinand Bordewijk Prize and the Pegasus Prize. It was published in an English translation in 1983 by Louisiana State University Press, which also published English translations of other works by Nooteboom through 1990.

The novel was adapted as a 1988 French-language film with the same title, directed by Herbert Curiel.

== Plot summary ==
Intermezzo, 1963: The novel begins with Inni Wintrop, a disillusioned and aimless man in his early thirties, living in Amsterdam. He is adrift in life, working as a translator and struggling to find meaning. Inni's life is marked by a series of failed relationships and a sense of detachment from the world around him. He becomes involved with a woman named Zita, but their relationship is strained and ultimately unfulfilling; he unsuccessfully attempts suicide after she leaves him. Inni's existential crisis deepens as he reflects on the emptiness of his existence and the repetitive, ritualistic nature of daily life.

Arnold Taads, 1953: The second part of the novel jumps backwards ten years. Inni is a young man living an aimless life with extreme indifference. His aunt Thérèse accosts him and takes him to meet a wealthy, eccentric businessman named Arnold Taads, who lives a highly structured and ritualized life. Taads represents a stark contrast to Inni's chaotic, purposeless existence. Taads's life is governed by strict routines and rituals, which he believes give his life order and meaning. Inni is both fascinated and repelled by Taads's worldview, and their interactions force him to confront his own lack of purpose. Despite his rigid self-discipline, Arnold is deeply unhappy and eventually dies in a skiing accident; Inni suggests that he was aware that he was risking his life and that the accident was a kind of suicide.

Philip Taads, 1973: The final part of the novel takes place ten years after the first part. Inni is now in his late forties and has become increasingly isolated. When delivering a woodcut to an art dealer, he meets Arnold's estranged son Philip, who lives an extremely ascetic, isolated life inspired by Eastern philosophy. Five years later, after procuring an ornate raku bowl (which seems to be his only goal in life), Philip invites Inni to partake in a Japanese tea ceremony using it. Later, he smashes the bowl and commits suicide by drowning. Inni dreams of the two Taadses together "in a mood of mad, barbaric mirth, arms flung around each other, shouting inaudibly."

== Reception ==
The novel was praised by critics. It won the Ferdinand Bordewijk Prize and the Pegasus Prize.

== Adaptations ==
- A 1988 Dutch-language feature film by the same title was adapted from this novel. It was directed by Herbert Curiel. and starred Derek de Lint.

== See also ==
- 1980 in literature
- Dutch literature
