= Ina Rilke =

Mozambique-born translator

Ina Rilke is a Mozambique-born translator who specializes in translating Dutch literature and French literature into English.

Born in Mozambique, she went to school in Porto in Portugal, attending Oporto British School. She studied translation at the University of Amsterdam, where she later taught.

Writers she has translated include Hafid Bouazza, Louis Couperus, Hella Haasse, W. F. Hermans, Arthur Japin, Erwin Mortier, Multatuli, Cees Nooteboom, Connie Palmen, Pierre Péju and Dai Sijie. Rilke has won the Vondel Prize, the Scott Moncrieff Prize and the Flemish Culture Prize. She has also been nominated for the Best Translated Book Award, the Oxford-Weidenfeld Translation Prize, the Independent Foreign Fiction Prize, and the IMPAC Book Award.

== Selected translations ==
- Multatuli, Max Havelaar – New York Review Books
- Otto de Kat, News from Berlin – MacLehose Press, 2013
- Adriaan van Dis, Betrayal – MacLehose Press, 2012
- Hella S. Haasse, The Black Lake – Portobello Books, 2012
- Otto de Kat, Julia – MacLehose Press, 2011
- Cees Nooteboom, The Foxes Come at Night – MacLehose Press, 2011
- Hella S. Haasse, The Tea Lords – Portobello Books, 2010
- Louis Couperus, Eline Vere – Archipelago, 2010
- Judith Vanistendael, Dance by the Light of the Moon – SelfMadeHero, 2010
- Erwin Mortier, Shutterspeed – Harvill Secker, 2007
- W. F. Hermans, The Darkroom of Damocles – Harvill Secker, 2007
- W. F. Hermans, Beyond Sleep – Harvill Secker, 2006
- Dai Sijie, Mr Muo and his Travelling Couch – Chatto & Windus, 2005
- Pierre Péju, The Girl from the Chartreuse – Harvill, 2005
- Adriaan van Dis, My Father's War – Heinemann, 2004
- Erwin Mortier, My Fellow Skin – Harvill, 2003
- Tessa de Loo, A Bed in Heaven – Arcadia, 2002
- Dai Sijie, Balzac and the Little Chinese Seamstress – Chatto & Windus, 2001
- Erwin Mortier, Marcel – Harvill, 2001
- Oscar van den Boogaard, Love's Death – Farrar Straus & Giroux, 2001
- Arthur Japin, The Two Hearts of Kwasi Boachi – Chatto & Windus, 2000
- Hafid Bouazza, Abdullah's Feet – Headline Review, 2000
- Connie Palmen, The Friendship – Harvill, 2000
- Cees Nooteboom, Roads to Santiago – Harvill, 1997
- Margriet de Moor, The Virtuoso – Picador, 1996
- Cees Nooteboom, The Following Story – Harvill, 1993
