= The Foxes Come at Night =

2009 story collection by Cees Nooteboom

- Author: Cees Nooteboom
- Original title: 's Nachts komen de vossen
- Translator: Ina Rilke
- Language: Dutch
- Publisher: De Bezige Bij
- Publication date: 2009
- Publication place: Netherlands
- English publication date: 2011
- Pages: 160
- ISBN: 9789023468844

The Foxes Come at Night (Dutch: 's Nachts komen de vossen) is a short story collection by the Dutch writer Cees Nooteboom, published by De Bezige Bij in 2009.

== Contents ==
- "Gondolas"
- "Thunderstorm"
- "Heinz"
- "Late September"
- "Late Afternoon"
- "Paula"
- "Paula II"
- "The Furthermost Point"

== Reception ==
Alberto Manguel of The Guardian wrote that the book works as an introduction to Nooteboom or a summary of his themes, which often concern language and human self-consciousness. Manguel called the collection "a full-bodied meditation on the end of things, broken into eight parts that essentially explore one single final experience".

Jonathan Gibbs of The Independent wrote that the stories are "translated without noticeable blemish". He highlighted "Paula" and "Paula II", calling them "closest to the flickering melancholy" of Nooteboom's earlier novella The Following Story.
