= All Souls' Day (novel) =

1998 novel by Cees Nooteboom

- First edition (Dutch)
- Author: Cees Nooteboom
- Original title: Allerzielen
- Translator: Susan Massotty
- Language: Dutch
- Publisher: Uitgeverij Atlas
- Publication date: 1998
- Publication place: Netherlands
- English publication date: 2001
- Pages: 398
- ISBN: 9045223414

All Souls' Day (Dutch: Allerzielen) is a 1998 novel by the Dutch writer Cees Nooteboom. It tells the story of a Dutch documentary filmmaker who lives in Berlin, and reflects, with his friends, on matters such as art, history, and national characters.

== Reception ==
Julie Myerson of The Guardian wrote:

"It's clear that Nooteboom knows more than enough about art, philosophy, semantics and the whole onanistic malarkey, but the effect of his prose is so blindingly didactic that you quickly feel you would pay good money to have someone smile or burp or drop something or talk about anything other than the reunification of Germany or the iconography of late German romanticism. I also wondered whether Susan Massoty's translation - unbearably arch, enervatingly fussy - might be letting him down." Myerson continued: "we are never allowed to empathise with, let alone believe in, the tragedy that has befallen Arthur. The dead wife and child are no more than juicy, gratuitous sidebars. No, 'juicy' is too kind; they're just bland tidbits, laid whingingly there on the page, and you quickly begin to resent them."

Publishers Weekly said: "Nooteboom's attempt at an intellectual novel is worthy of respect, but Arthur and his friends are frustratingly static in their habits and thoughts, their perorations inflated with hot air. More enervating than invigorating, the book fails to communicate the vitality of a life of thought."

== See also ==
- 1998 in literature
- Dutch literature
