= Pegasus Prize =

The Pegasus Prize for Literature is a literary prize established by Mobil (now ExxonMobil) in 1977 to honor works from countries whose literature is rarely translated into English. The prize includes a monetary award, a medal depicting Pegasus, and translation into English and subsequent publication of the work by Louisiana State University Press. As at 2024 the Louisiana State University Press lists the Pegasus Prize as an inactive series.

The country is first recommended by a committee and then an independent selection committee in the chosen nation determines the winner. Representatives to the country selection committee have included Mona Simpson, Alan Cheuse, and William Jay Smith. In 1984 Mobil focussed on New Zealand alongside its sponsorship of the Te Maori exhibition in New York. The selection panel came from outside the "literary establishment" and included both Māori and non-Māori (pākehā): Sidney Mead, Peter Sharples, Anne Salmond, Terry Sturm, Elizabeth Murchie and Wiremu Parker.

== Winners of the Pegasus Prize ==
- 1979 – Kirsten Thorup for Baby
- 1980 – Tidiane Dem for Masseni
- 1983 – Cees Nooteboom for Rituals
- 1985 – Keri Hulme for The Bone People
- 1986 – Ismail Marahimin for And the War is Over
- 1989 – Kjartan Fløgstad for Dollar Road
- 1991 – Jia Pingwa for Turbulence
- 1993 – Martin Simecka for The Year of the Frog
- 1994 – Bilge Karasu for Night
- 1995 – Francisco Rebolledo for Rasero
- 1996 – Mario de Carvalho for A God Strolling in the Cool of the Evening
- 1998 – Ana Teresa Torres for Doña Inés vs. Oblivion
