= Afscheid =

2020 poetry collection by Cees Nooteboom

- Author: Cees Nooteboom
- Language: Dutch
- Publisher: Uitgeverij Koppernik
- Publication date: June 2020
- Publication place: Netherlands
- Pages: 56
- ISBN: 9789083048062

Afscheid, gedicht uit de tijd van het virus (lit. 'Farewell: Poem from the Time of the Virus') is a poetry collection by the Dutch writer Cees Nooteboom, published by Uitgeverij Koppernik in June 2020. The book explores Nooteboom's urge to travel, which is disrupted by the COVID-19 pandemic and leads to reflections on death and the pre-Socratic philosopher Empedocles.

The book consists of 33 poems arranged into 3 sections of 11 poems each. Each poem consists of three quatrains followed by a separate thirteenth line. The Divine Comedy inspired the structure and meter.
