= Ana Margarida de Carvalho =

Portuguese writer & journalist (born 1969)

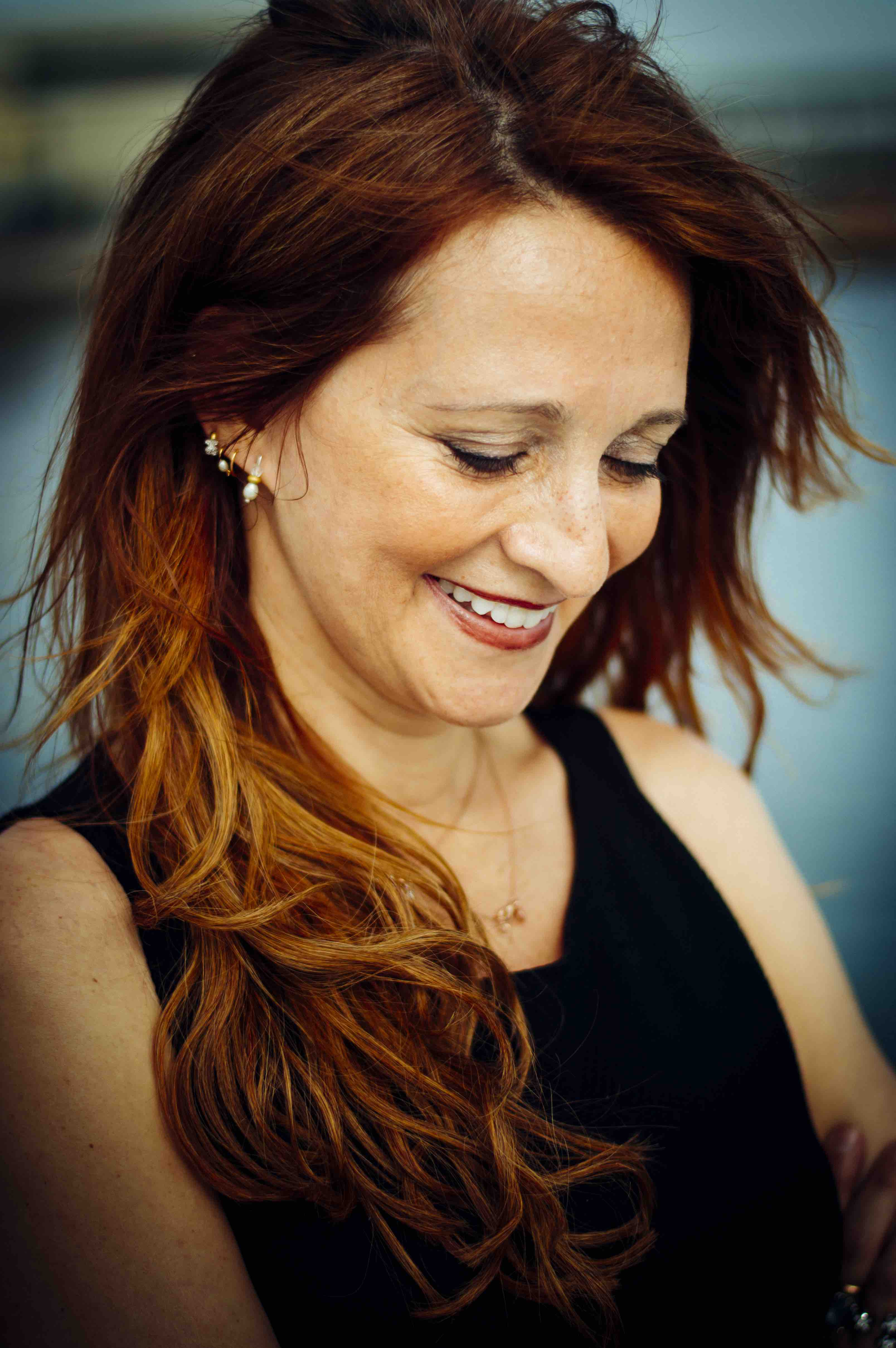
Ana Margarida de Carvalho

Ana Margarida Taborda Duarte Martins de Carvalho (born 1969 in Lisbon) is a Portuguese writer and journalist. She is the only Portuguese writer to be awarded with the Grande Prémio da Associação Portuguesa de Escritores (APE/DGLB) for each of her three successive works of literary fiction; they were for two novels and a short-story collection.

== Biography and work ==
Born in Lisbon, in 1969, her father is Portuguese writer Mário de Carvalho, Ana Margarida de Carvalho graduated in Law from the University of Lisbon School of Law.

She was awarded in seven distinct occasions for her work as a journalist, working for over 25 years at Revista Visão, a news magazine where she was both an editor and a leading reporter, as well as collaborating with a number of other cultural and news publications such as Jornal de Letras, Revista Ler, Marie Claire, Egoísta, Colóquio Letras and the television news channel SIC.

During this period, she was also a film critic for the Final Cut blog, of which she was a founder, and Revista Visão, in which she also developed an online weekly chronicle called "Conversas de Elevador" for two years. As a jury in ICA, the Portuguese Institute of Cinema and Audiovisual, she was a part of the selection process that attributed subsidies to diverse documentaries, films and scripts.

Three of her scripts (documentary and fiction) were recipient of this public subsidy, all of them placed first.

Her literary debut was in 2013 with the publication of the novel Que Importa a Fúria do Mar. It was received with critical acclaim and was awarded the most important literary prize in Portugal, promoted by the APE, Portuguese Writers Association, the Grande Prémio de Romance e Novela APE/DGLAB – 2013, as well as being a finalist for at least 3 other literary awards.

Her second novel, Não se Pode Morar nos Olhos de Um Gato, was equally distinguished with the Grande Prémio de Romance e Novela APE/DGLAB – 2016, as well as being awarded in the first edition of the literary Prémio Manuel de Boaventura in 2017. The book was also considered for the Oceanos-Prêmio de Literatura em Língua Portuguesa, a Brazilian literary award for Literature in the Portuguese Language attributed by the institute Itáu Cultural, and the Portuguese Society of Authors best book award of 2017. It was subsequently published in Brazil in 2018

Her first collection of short stories, Pequenos Delírios Domésticos, released in 2017, was the recipient of the Grande Prémio de Conto Camilo Castelo Branco APE/CM Vila Nova de Famalicão, the most important short-story award in Portugal, establishing her as the first Portuguese author to be granted APE awards for three works in succession.

The 2015 reprint of José Cardoso Pires Alexandra Alpha includes a preface written by Ana Margarida de Carvalho.

The Portuguese Government started attributing public grants for the purpose of literary creation in 2017, of which she was one of the first grantees.

She frequently coordinates creative writing sessions as well as literary workshops.

Her third book, O Gesto que Fazemos para Proteger a Cabeça, was published in late 2019.

== Publications (fiction) ==
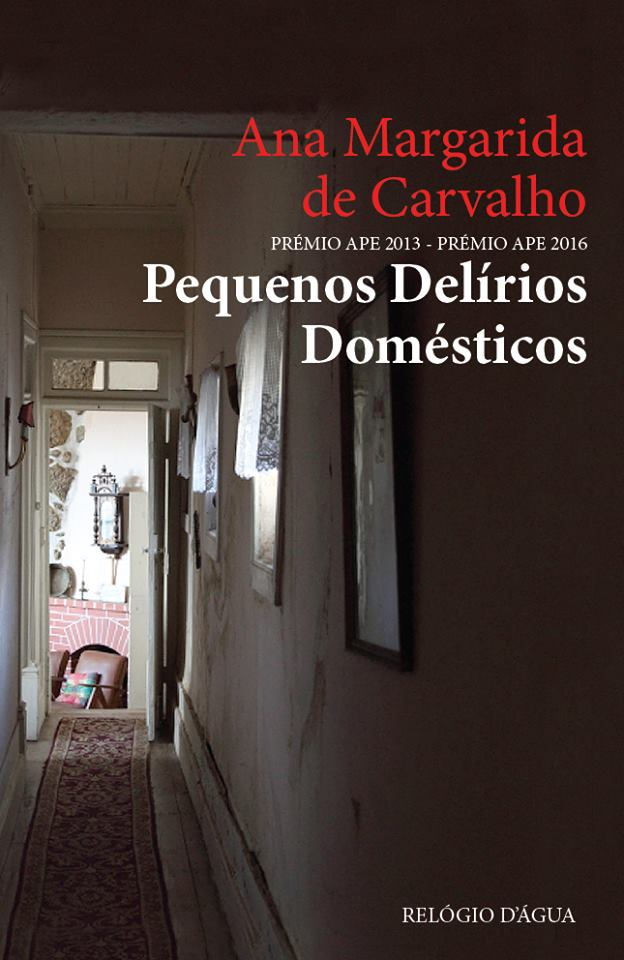
Cover of the Short-Story collection Pequenos Delírios Domésticos

- Que Importa a Fúria do Mar (novel), 2013. – Grande Prémio de Romance e Novela APE/DGLAB – 2013
  - Runner-up, Prémio Leya
  - Runner-up, Prémio Fernando Namora
  - Runner-up, Prémio PEN
- A Arca do É (ou a Versão Vegetariana da Arca do Noé), co-authored with the illustrator Sérgio Marques, (children's literature), 2015.
- Não Se Pode Morar nos Olhos de Um Gato (novel), 2016. – Grande Prémio de Romance e Novela APE/DGLAB – 2016 e Prémio Manuel de Boaventura 2017 (CM Esposende).
  - Runner-up, Oceanos-Prêmio de Literatura em Língua Portuguesa.
  - Runner-up, Prémio Fernando Namora.
  - Nominated for Best Book of 2017 by the Portuguese Society of Authors.
- Pequenos Delírios Domésticos (short-story collection), 2017. – Grande Prémio de Conto Camilo Castelo Branco APE/CM Vila Nova de Famalicão.
  - Runner-up, Prémio PEN
- O Gesto que Fazemos para Proteger a Cabeça (novel), 2019.

== Awards ==
=== Literary ===
- Grande Prémio de Romance e Novela APE/DGLAB – 2013, for the book «Que Importa a Fúria do Mar»
- Grande Prémio de Romance e Novela APE/DGLAB – 2016, for the book «Não Se Pode Morar nos Olhos de Um Gato»
- Prémio Manuel de Boaventura 2017 (CM Esposende), for the book «Não Se Pode Morar nos Olhos de Um Gato»
- Grande Prémio de Conto Camilo Castelo Branco APE/CM Vila Nova de Famalicão, for the book «Pequenos Delírios Domésticos»

=== Journalism ===
- Prémio Revelação Gazeta – 1994, Clube de Jornalistas de Lisboa;
- Prémio Nacional Abel Salazar – 1995, Clube de Jornalistas do Porto;
- Prémio Nacional Alexandre Herculano – 1995, Clube de Jornalistas do Porto;
- Prémio Cidade de Lisboa, menção honrosa – 1997, Câmara Municipal de Lisboa;
- Prémio Orlando Gonçalves – 1998, Câmara Municipal da Amadora;
- Prémio Maria Lamas – 2000, Comissão da Igualdade e Direitos da Mulher;
- Prémio Reportagem Norberto Lopes – 2001, Casa da Imprensa
