= Mário de Carvalho =

Portuguese playwright (born 1944)

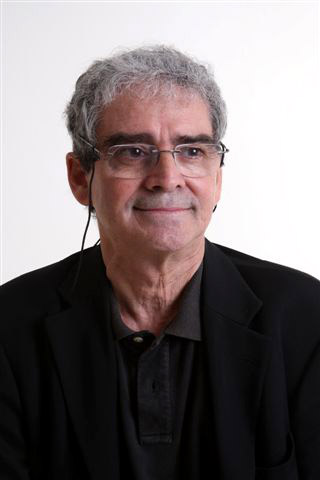
- Born: Mário Costa Martins de Carvalho; September 25, 1944; Lisbon, Portugal
- Occupations: Playwright, novelist
- Writing career
- Period: 1981–present

Mário Costa Martins de Carvalho (born 25 September 1944) is a Portuguese playwright and novelist.

== Life ==
Mario de Carvalho was born in Lisbon, Portugal. He was a member of the Portuguese Communist Party, and was involved in the resistance against António de Oliveira Salazar's dictatorship. During his military service he was jailed and tortured, and eventually escaped the country on foot, settling in Sweden. After the Carnation Revolution in 1974 he returned to Portugal and practiced law for many years.

His first book of short stories was published in 1981. He has published novels, story collections and plays and has been widely translated. His work has been made into films.

His historical fiction is set in various times and places.

A God Strolling in the Cool of the Evening (Um Deus Passeando Pela Brisa da Tarde) won the 1996 Pegasus Prize for Literature and has been translated into English, French, Spanish, Italian, German, Greek, Bulgarian and Polish. The translator into English was Gregory Rabassa.

He is the father of the writer Ana Margarida de Carvalho.

== Works ==
- Contos da Sétima Esfera (short stories), 1981
- do Beco das Sardinheiras (short stories), 1982
- O Livro Grande de Tebas, Navio e Mariana (novel), 1982
- A inaudita guerra da Avenida Gago Coutinho (short stories), 1983
- Fabulário (short stories), 1984
- Contos Soltos (short stories), 1986
- A Paixão do Conde de Fróis (novel), 1986
- E se Tivesse a Bondade de Me Dizer Porquê? (Folhetim), em colab. com Clara Pinto Correia, 1986
- Os Alferes (short stories), 1989
- Quatrocentos Mil Sestércios seguido de O Conde Jano (novels), 1991 - Grande Prémio de Conto Camilo Castelo Branco
- Água em pena de pato (theatre), 1991
- Um Deus Passeando pela Brisa da Tarde (Romance), 1994 (A God Strolling in the Cool of the Evening, 1997) - 1996 Pegasus Prize
- Era Bom que Trocássemos Umas Ideias Sobre o Assunto (novel), 1995
- Apuros de um Pessimista em Fuga (novel), 1999
- Se Perguntarem por Mim, Não Estou seguido de Haja Harmonia (theatre), 1999
- Contos Vagabundos (short stories), 2000
- Fantasia para dois coronéis e uma piscina (novel), 2003
- O Homem que Engoliu a Lua (Infanto-juvenil), 2003
- A Sala Magenta 2008
- A Arte de Morrer Longe, 2010
- O Homem do Turbante Verde (short stories), 2011
- Quando o Diabo Reza, 2011
- A Liberdade De Pátio, (short stories) 2013
