= Roads to Santiago =

1992 book by Cees Nooteboom

- First edition (Dutch)
- Author: Cees Nooteboom
- Original title: De omweg naar Santiago
- Translator: Ina Rilke
- Language: Dutch
- Subject: Spain
- Genre: travelogue
- Publisher: Uitgeverij Atlas
- Publication date: 1992
- Publication place: Amsterdam
- English publication date: 1996
- Pages: 412
- ISBN: 9025400434

Roads to Santiago is a travelogue by the Dutch novelist, poet and journalist Cees Nooteboom. First published in 1992 in Dutch (as De omweg naar Santiago), its English translation, by Ina Rilke, was first published in 1996. In common with many pilgrims, Nooteboom's goal is Santiago de Compostela in Galicia; however, he travels by car and the route he takes is not at all direct.

== Synopsis ==
The book consists of a series of "loosely-connected" essays, derived from short pieces first published in periodicals.

It starts with a description of the entrance to the cathedral of Santiago de Compostela, and specifically "a marble column with deep impressions of fingers, ... created by millions of hands, including my own". But Nooteboom quickly adds that he hardly qualifies: as a non-believer, arriving by car, he has never felt the emotion that a genuine pilgrim would experience. These thoughts go through his mind while on board a ship to Barcelona, from where he will rent a car and drive to Santiago for the third time.

Nevertheless, his journey will be a pilgrimage of a kind, Nooteboom believes: a pilgrimage "to an earlier, shadowy self, the recapture of a past passage". On his first arrival in Italy, in 1953, he had been thrilled: "everything seemed more refined, more vivid, more vibrant" than back home in the Netherlands. But "Spain after that was a disappointment": harsh in various ways. Yet Nooteboom now has "the feeling ... that the Spanish character and the Spanish landscape correspond to what in essence I am...".

"[W]hat we have here is a crisscrossing of several different excursions across Spain with Santiago as their beacon rather than their goal"; Nooteboom "[traverses] the Spanish countryside, both north and south, taking particular delight in the meseta, the rolling central highlands of Castile", making "a perpetual series of detours".

The book has 25 numbered chapters, on disparate subjects. As examples, XIII, XIV and XV are titled "Winter days in Navarre", "Walter Muir Whitehill", and "Perhaps the dove knows" respectively. Within the contents list, the content of each chapter is briefly listed; and the latter list reappears at the start of the relevant chapter. For chapter XV, it reads:

In the kingdom of Asturias ⁓ Fuente Dé ⁓ The jigsaw puzzle of Spanish history ⁓ Unsubjugated Basques ⁓ The cradle of the Reconquest ⁓ A memorable glass of orujo ⁓ Santa María de Lebeña ⁓ Connections across 1,000 years ⁓ A summit in blue (Note: What these refer to: Within Asturia, a parador, Fuente Dé. An analogy for a determined, prolonged, but unsuccessful attempt to make sense of the centuries-long Reconquista: a vast jigsaw puzzle, for which additional pieces periodically arrive, further complicating the puzzle. The Basques, past and present. A region from which the lands between the Ebro and Duero rivers were recaptured from the Moors. Nooteboom's destination for the day: the church of Santa María in Lebeña. A distilled alcoholic drink he is served by the caretaker of the church. The lost meanings of the patterns made by the millennium-old carvings into a large stone in the church. Doves of a millennium ago having been the same as the dove now outside the church, the possibility that the latter could somehow "[hear] the Asturian murmurings of the men hacking the stone to size". Back at Fuente Dé, a cable car up the mountain. The terrifying view up: "the worst is the blue, so absolute, so utter, so removed from the earth that I ought to invent a new name for it".)

In the last chapter, Nooteboom at last reaches the cathedral:

I was guided by a scallop, and now I was going to put my hand into that other, empty marble hand. Yes, I had reached my destination.

The book has an index, and is illustrated with 65 monochrome photographs, most of which are by Nooteboom's wife, Simone Sassen.

== Reception ==
The translator and essayist Alberto Manguel writes in The Sydney Morning Herald that "Nooteboom is best in his digressions, and his chatting matches his erratic wanderings in search of a certain church or painting". This, he suspects, is largely due to "Nooteboom's magpie curiosity and pelican openheartedness that cannot perch still in one place but flits around from one attractive glint to another", which "makes for enthralling reading".

Reviewing the book for The Observer, the Hispanophile Tristan Garel-Jones claims that the book has a "centrepiece" or "driving force":

[I]t is Romanesque Spain – that coming together of Spain's medieval, Arab, Jewish and Christian past in stone.... Nooteboom follows Professor Muir [Whitehill]'s meticulous and scholarly tract, (Note: Walter Muir Whitehill, Spanish Romanesque Architecture of the Eleventh Century (1941).) adding a poetry of his own. All the sincerity, simplicity and the fantasies of these architectural jewels ... are revealed.... Nooteboom has dealt with the stones, the canvases and the countryside with the same lyricism as Laurie Lee and Starkie dealt with the people.

In a review for The Boston Globe, the art and literary critic Robert Taylor – who also remarks on Nooteboom's respect for the work of Muir Whitehill – notes that for Nooteboom "[t]ravel is less a sightseeing journey than a pilgrimage", pointing out that he goes to Guadalupe to visit the "Black Madonna". The book's "wonderful commentaries" include those on Velázquez' Las Meninas, on the works of Francisco de Zurbarán, on Cervantes, and on Jorge Luis Borges ("an elegiac farewell to a writer with whom [Nooteboom] has much in common").

Reviewing the book for The New York Times, the historian Richard L. Kagan noted its resemblance to "a classic pilgrim's tale written for purposes of spiritual edification, a kind of Michelin for the soul" (although this does not preclude appreciations of the cuisine and wine). But, Kagan continues, there is a key to this:

It turns out that Nooteboom's Santiago is less of a place than a metaphor for everything that is old, traditional and, for him, almost sacred, in Spanish life. His pilgrimage thus becomes an exercise in time travel, an effort to capture, and to preserve, the world before progress. It follows that whenever he contemplates Spain, it is a fictionalized construct: empty, quiet as a crypt, rustic, homespun, timeless, a country with sounds, smells, occupations which have long since vanished elsewhere, one so doggedly outdated that it even has preserved a different sort of time.

Thus for Nooteboom, "every monument, every work of art transforms itself into a memory palace that unlocks Spain's history". Kagan concedes that "Occasionally glimpses of late 20th century modernity ... intrude, but Nooteboom quickly dispenses with these annoyances, generally by heading straight for Spain's empty countryside as a 'refuge from the fullness of Europe'."

In the Los Angeles Times, the critic Richard Eder comments that

Nooteboom writes exquisitely and evocatively, though he stuffs in too much undigested history and too many untransformed guidebook details. His reflections on history and art are uneven; some facile and obvious, others stimulating and unexpected. His love for bare Spain – "megatons of emptiness, eons of rest, hectoliters of silence" – is a genuine and persuasive passion.

He adds that "In all [Nooteboom's] traveling and pondering, though, there is barely a single live Spanish voice. Only history, art and landscape speak to him."

Reviewers of the book in English translation have classed it with books about Spain by George Borrow, Gerald Brenan, Patrick Leigh Fermor, Norman Lewis, and Walter Starkie.

De omweg naar Santiago is part of the Basisbibliotheek (Basic Library of Dutch Literature) of the Digital library for Dutch literature (DBNL).

== See also ==
- 1992 in literature
- Dutch literature
- List of travel books

== Works cited ==
- Nooteboom, Cees (1996). Roads to Santiago. Translated by Rilke, Ina. New York: Harcourt Brace – via the Internet Archive.
