= Lost Paradise (novel) =

2004 novel by Cees Nooteboom

- First edition (Dutch)
- Author: Cees Nooteboom
- Original title: Paradijs verloren
- Translator: Susan Massotty
- Language: Dutch
- Publisher: Uitgeverij Atlas
- Publication date: 2004
- Publication place: Netherlands
- English publication date: 2007
- Pages: 156
- ISBN: 9045005093

Lost Paradise (Dutch: Paradijs verloren) is a 2004 novel by the Dutch writer Cees Nooteboom. It tells the story of two Brazilian women who move to Australia, and of a Dutch middle-aged critic who goes to an Alpine spa.

== Reception ==
The book was reviewed in Publishers Weekly: "Framed by masterful reflections on misunderstandings in life and literature, Nooteboom's short work, at once delicate and chiseled, achieves a dreamlike suspension of time and place."

== See also ==
- 2004 in literature
- Dutch literature
