= Henk Hofland =

Dutch journalist

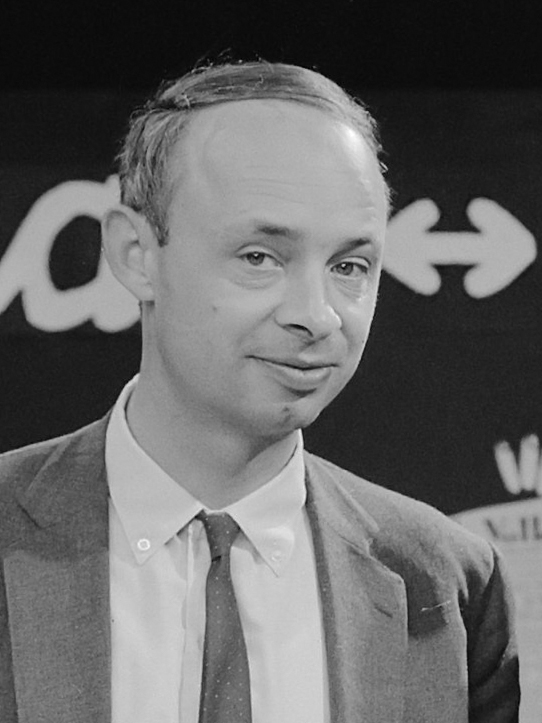
- Hofland in 1964
- Born: Hendrik Johannes Adrianus Hofland; 20 July 1927; Rotterdam, Netherlands
- Died: 21 June 2016 (aged 88); Amsterdam, Netherlands
- Occupations: Journalist, columnist, essayist
- Years active: 1953–2016
- Awards: P. C. Hooft Award (2011)

Hendrik Johannes Adrianus "Henk" Hofland (Dutch pronunciation: [ˈɦɛndrɪk joːˈɦɑnəs aːdriˈjaːnʏs ɦɛŋk ˈɦɔflɑnt]; 20 July 1927 – 21 June 2016), also commonly known as H.J.A. Hofland, was a Dutch journalist, commentator, essayist, and columnist. He is often referred to as the éminence grise of Dutch journalism. In 1999 he was named Dutch "Journalist of the century" in a nationwide poll among his peers. He once described himself as belonging to the "anarcho-liberal community", though his political orientation is that of the secular center of society.

== Early life and career ==
Hofland was born in Rotterdam. As a twelve-year-old boy he witnessed the bombing of the city on 14 May 1940, during the German invasion of the Netherlands, in which the centre of Rotterdam was almost completely destroyed, killing 900 civilians and leaving 80,000 homeless. It was an episode that marked his life: "On 15 May I woke up in a completely different world. It is an experience that stays with you your entire life. The bosses were not bosses anymore, the city was on fire, and the villains had the upper hand."

In 1946 he started to study at Nyenrode Business University, where he met Willem Oltmans. He never finished his studies. In 1950 he moved to Amsterdam, and in 1953 started his journalistic career at the Algemeen Handelsblad's foreign desk. At the Handelsblad, Anton Constandse instructed Hofland to the practice of journalism; he worked with Hans van Mierlo and Jan Blokker, who became lifelong friends, just like author Harry Mulisch.

In October 1956 Hofland went to Budapest, where the revolution against Soviet occupation had been going on for several days. On the night of 3 November he heard the Russian tanks arrive in the capital and witnessed the surrender of the resistance. Hofland later declared "I knew that freedom had lost and that the West wouldn't help."

== Editor in chief ==
In 1960, as the paper's junior foreign editor, he went to the United States in the US State Department's Jointly Sponsored Journalists project, that organised placement of foreign journalists with American provincial newspapers. He followed a course in journalism at the Pennsylvania State University and worked with the Johnstown Tribune-Democrat. He covered the Presidential primaries in New Hampshire and West Virginia and heard John F. Kennedy speak, an experience he remembered as "flamboyant, unforgettable". Although he shook Kennedy's hand, he was too shy to ask a question at the time.

In 1962 he became deputy editor in chief of the Handelsblad, and subsequently its editor in chief in 1968. In 1972, two years after the Handelsblad had merged with the Nieuwe Rotterdamsche Courant (NRC), becoming NRC Handelsblad, he resigned his post after a bitter conflict with the publisher about the disconnect between the liberal editorial staff of the newspaper and the more conservative readership.

== New Journalism ==
As a freelance journalist he continued to publish articles, essays and reports for NRC Handelsblad. In 1972 he published a book, Tegels Lichten (Lifting Tiles), containing essays on postwar Dutch domestic politics and various high-profile 'affairs', such as the decolonization of Indonesia, the Dutch-Indonesian dispute about New Guinea and in particular the "anguish of Dutch authorities." He wrote the book out of anger and frustration about the Dutch cover-up culture in politics and business.

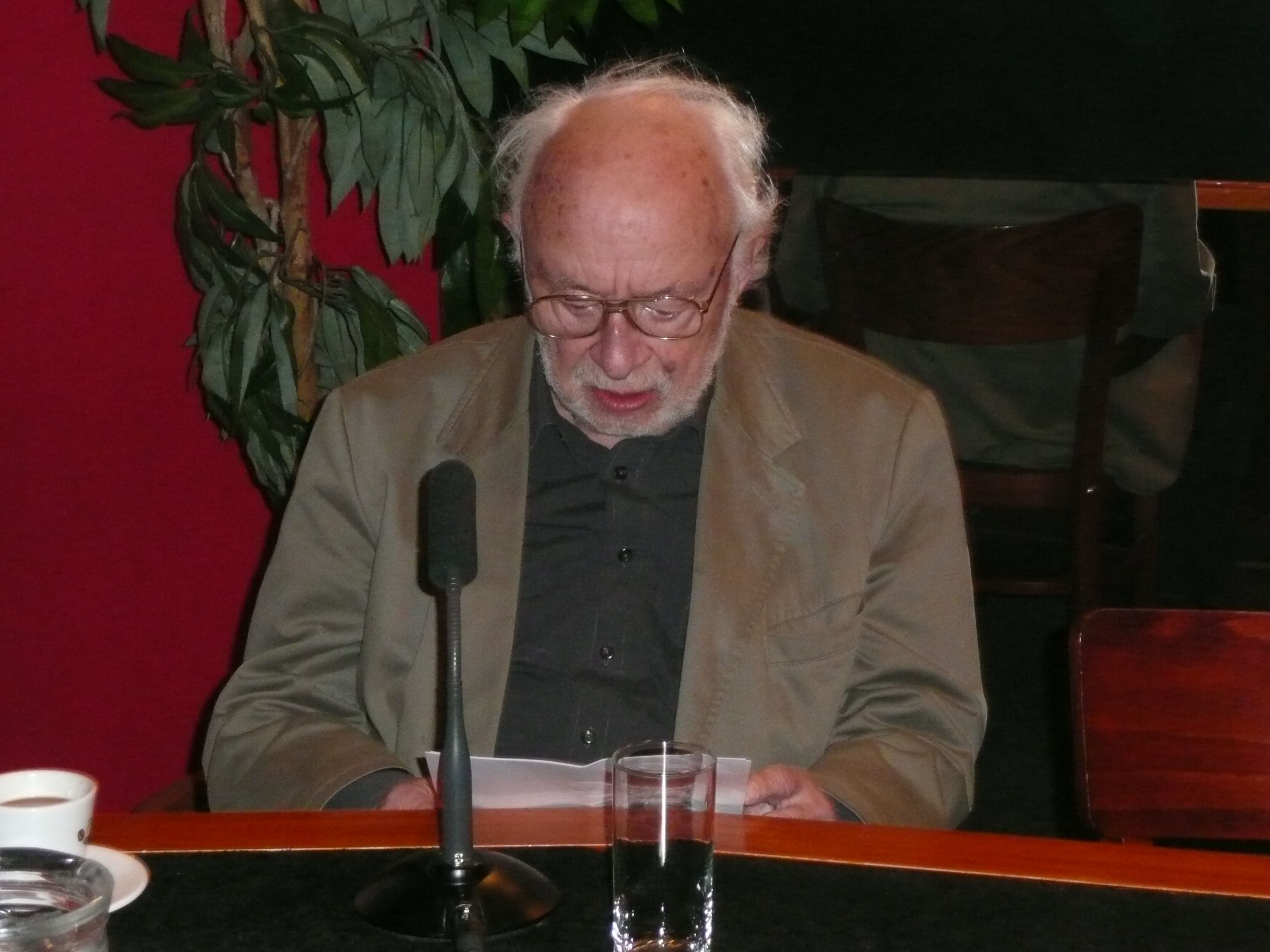
Henk Hofland in 2009

Operating along the lines of the American New Journalism he made the television documentary Vastberaden, maar soepel en met mate (Determined, but flexible and cautious), with television journalists Hans Keller and Hans Verhagen in 1974 for the VPRO. They provided the rich tradition of the Dutch documentary with an effective narrative style, and especially a new social engagement.

Under the alias Samuel Montag, a pseudonym he took from a British banking house, he writes ruminations on everyday aspects of life. A frequent New York resident, he often voices exasperation at modern phenomena such as advertising, linguistic deterioration, free market ideology and growing car ownership. From 2002 he also writes a column for the weekly De Groene Amsterdammer.

== Legacy and death ==
He died at the age of 88 in June 2016. His columns and essays have been collected in some 30 books. He also published several novels and short stories. One of his favourite authors was the journalist Curzio Malaparte.

== Awards ==
Hofland received among others the following awards:

- 1961 - Anne Frank Prize
- 1996 - Gouden Ganzenveer
- 1999 - 'Dutch journalist of the century' in a nationwide poll among his peers.
- 2011 - P. C. Hooft Award, the nation's highest literary award. The jury praised Hofland for his effortless style, unflagging ethos and balanced views. "No one in this country has over the past sixty years sounded its social developments with so much vigilance and impartiality, with so much sprezzatura as well as persistence and continuity, evidence of an iron discipline".
