= A God Strolling in the Cool of the Evening =

1994 novel by Mario de Carvalho

- Cover of the English Language Paperback Edition (2001)
- Author: Mario de Carvalho
- Original title: Um Deus Passeando Pela Brisa da Tarde
- Translator: Gregory Rabassa
- Language: Portuguese
- Genre: Historical novel, philosophical novel
- Published: 1994 Caminho, Portugal
- Publication place: Portugal
- Media type: Print (hardback & paperback)
- Pages: 304 pp (2001 US paperback)
- ISBN: 978-0807122358 (1997 US paperback)
- LC Class: PQ9265.A7717 D4813

A God Strolling in the Cool of the Evening (Portuguese: Um Deus Passeando Pela Brisa da Tarde) is a historical novel by the Portuguese writer Mário de Carvalho, set in the Roman province of Lusitania during the reign of Roman Emperor Commodus. First published in Portugal in Portuguese in 1994 as Um Deus Passeando Pela Brisa da Tarde, the novel won several awards, including the 1996 Pegasus Prize, and became a best-seller in Portugal. A God Strolling in the Cool of the Evening won the 1996 Pegasus Prize for Literature and has been translated into English, French, Spanish, Italian, German, Greek, Bulgarian and Polish.

== Plot ==
The book is told as a first-person narrative by Lucius Valerius Quintius, prefect of the fictional city Tarcisis during the reign of Marcus Aurelius. He faces threats both internal and external, as Moors from North Africa are attacking the province, which is beset by social and political unrest. At the same time, the new Christian faith is gaining strength in the Roman lands. Quintus tries to deal justly with all these problems, inspired by the ideas of his role model, the Emperor Marcus Aurelius.

As tension builds in the city, Quintius must decide how to punish Christian subversives led by the beautiful Iunia Cantaber, the daughter of an old friend of his. The prefect hesitates, for he has fallen in love with Iunia. He is both fascinated by and frustrated with the followers of the new religion; these people who "worship fish", as he puts it. He also reflects back on his visit to Rome ten years earlier, where he met his hero Marcus Aurelius.
