= Adrienne Dixon =

Translator of Dutch and Flemish literature into English

Adrienne Dixon (29 June 1932 - 16 September 1990) was a translator of Dutch and Flemish literature into English. She translated the work of Cees Nooteboom and other authors, including Harry Mulisch. She received the Martinus Nijhoff Prize in 1974 for her translations of Mulisch and Louis Paul Boon.

"Dixon is one of the most prolific translators of Dutch fiction... One reviewer even suggested that she should be honoured for what she has done 'to reclaim contemporary Dutch fiction for anglophone readers'."

== Personal life ==
She was born Adrienne Meijering in the village of Beilen in Drenthe in the Netherlands in 1932. She moved to England in 1957, where she married Robin Dixon (they had three children). She taught at a secondary school.

She died in Essex in 1990.

== Translations ==
- Opgravingen in bijbelse grond by Cyrus H. Gordon, 1960. Translated to Dutch from the English Adventures in the Near East.
- The Stone Bridal Bed by Harry Mulisch, 1962. Translated from the Dutch Het Stenen bruidsbed.
- The Ring by Karah Feder-Tal, 1965. Translated from the Dutch Waar bleef de ring.
- These were Europeans by Ton Oosterhuis, 1970. Translated from the Dutch Met en zonder harnas.
- Reflections: a novel by Mark Insingel, 1971. Translated from the Dutch Spiegelingen.
- Chapel road by Louis Paul Boon, 1972. Translated from the Dutch Kapellekensbaan.
- A matter of life and death by Anna Blaman, 1974. Translated from the Dutch Op leven en dood.
- The man who meant well by Gerard Walschap, 1975. Translated from the Dutch Een mens van goede wil.
- A course of time by Mark Insingel, 1977. Translated from the Dutch Een Tijdsverloop.
- Rituals : a novel by Cees Nooteboom, 1983. Translated from the Dutch Rituelen.
- My territory by Mark Insingel, 1987. Translated from the Dutch Mijn Territorium.
- In the Dutch mountains by Cees Nooteboom, 1987. Translated from the Dutch In Nederland.
- Last call by Harry Mulisch, 1987. Translated from the Dutch Hoogste tijd.
- Out of mind by J. Bernlef, 1988. Translated from the Dutch Hersenschimmen.
- Philip and the others by Cees Nooteboom, 1988. Translated from the Dutch Philip en de anderen.
- A song of truth and semblance by Cees Nooteboom, 1990. Translated from the Dutch Een Lied van Schijn en wezen.
- The knight has died : a novel by Cees Nooteboom, 1990. Translated from the Dutch De ridder is gestorven.
- Sunken red by Jeroen Brouwers, 1990. Translated from the Dutch Bezonken rood.
- Public secret by J. Bernlef, 1992. Translated from the Dutch Publiek geheim.
