= K. Schippers =

Dutch poet, prose writer, and art critic (1936–2021)

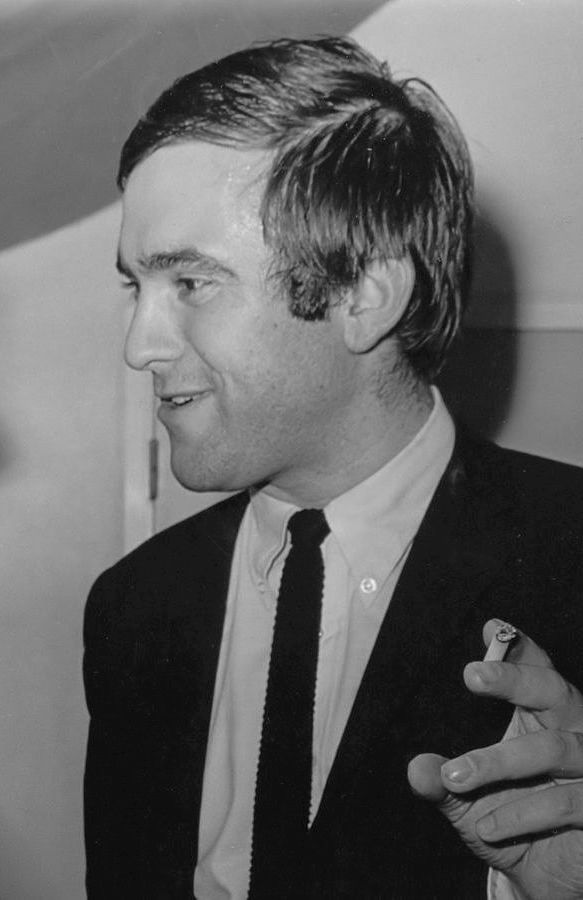
K. Schippers at the Amsterdam Municipal Poetry Award, 8 December 1967

Gerard Stigter (6 November 1936 – 12 August 2021), known by the pseudonym K. Schippers, was a Dutch poet, prose writer and art critic. Credited with having introduced the readymade as a poetic form, the whole of his work is dedicated to looking at everyday objects and events in a new way.

== Career ==
Schippers was born in Amsterdam. Together with J. Bernlef and other friends, he founded the Neo-Dadaist magazine Barbarber (1958–71). In the years that followed the launch he co-operated with Bernlef in editing selections from the magazine and, in Een cheque voor de tandarts (A cheque for the dentist, 1967), in commenting on the ancestry of its literary stance. Another binding link with Bernlef is the fact that in 1960 they married twin sisters, the daughters of the Dutch poet Ed. Hoornik (1910–70).

As an art critic, Schippers also authored studies of the history of Dada in the Netherlands (Holland Dada, 1974) and of the bride theme in the work of Marcel Duchamp (De bruid van Marcel Duchamp, 2010), as well as writing his own text inspired by the work of Man Ray (Het formaat van Man Ray, 1979) and editing the experimental poems of Theo van Doesburg (Nieuwe woordbeeldingen. Verzamelde gedichten van I.K. Bonset, 1975).

Among the literary awards Schippers garnered was the 1966 Amsterdam Municipal poetry prize for his second collection of poetry, Een klok en profil; the 1983 Multatuli Prize for his third novel Beweegredenen; the 1995 and 1999 Silver Griffin for his plays for children; and the 1996 P.C. Hooft Award for his work as a whole. After his selected poems of 1980, he published no new collections until 2011. In 2014 his collection Buiten Beeld was chosen as the gift volume to accompany other poetry purchases during National Poetry Week in the Netherlands and Flanders.

== Crossing boundaries ==
When Schippers helped launch Barbarber, it was called a ‘magazine for texts’ (tijdschrift voor teksten) and was distrustful of the work of the preceding 1950s generation of experimental poets on the grounds that their concern had been more with aesthetics than with the nature of reality, which ought to be the real focus of poetry. The anti-poetic gestures appearing in the magazine were inspired by Dada and eventually introduced ‘literary ready-mades’ in order to call into question the boundary between art and reality. One item provided by Schippers was a newspaper item about a lost tortoise. The same iconoclastic attitudes continued into his later work. In Buiten Beeld (Beyond the frame, 2014), for example, bare dots on the two-dimensional page are titled “The position of moles in the sky”, drawing a parallel between a conventional star map and molehills in the earth merely by the suggestiveness of the title alone.

Though much of his later poetic work has an apparent form, it very seldom rhymes or makes use of metaphor and its main purpose is to draw attention to the ordinary and everyday. In “White” Schippers affirms that “white is noticed/ because it’s not alone/ on the paper”. This same approach is confirmed too in Buiten Beeld in the poem “Black”, with its final appeal to a child's vision: ‘Look at [letters]/ like a five-year-old/ who has never/ read a word’. Such a fresh way of looking at ordinary things from unfamiliar angles was suggested by Marcel Duchamp’s saying that ‘when a clock is seen from the side it no longer tells the time’, from which Schippers took the title of his second poetry collection, Een klok en profil (A clock in profile, 1965).

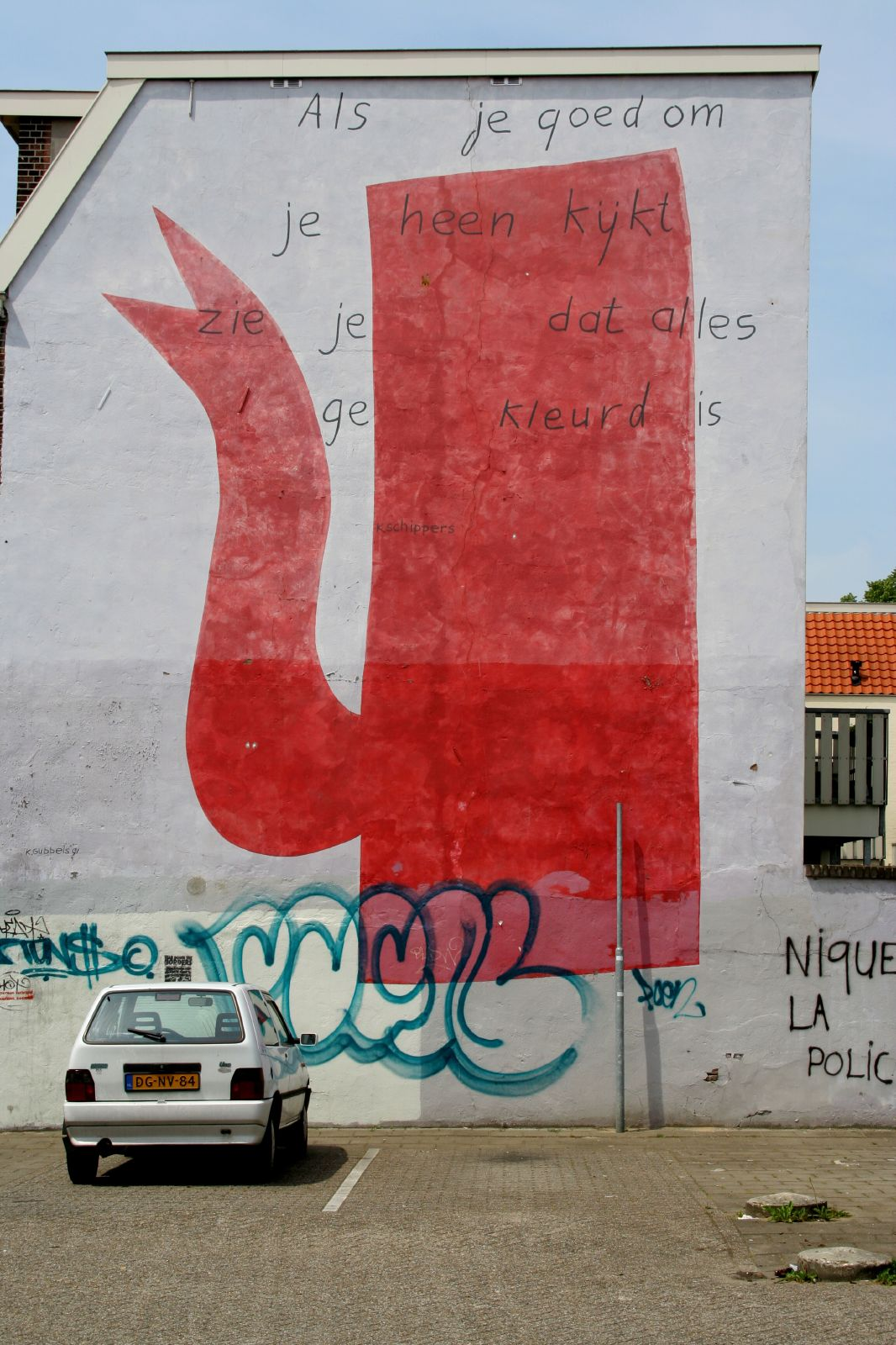
An urban mural by Klaas Gubbels incorporating a poem by Schippers

Eventually he also extended this vision into his novels. Eerste Indrukken (First impressions, 1979) is subtitled ‘the memoirs of a three-year-old’, where nothing unusual happens to the youngster, but it is related from an unusual, fresh perspective. Some poems were recycled into these novels. The sentence “Take a good look around you and you see everything is coloured” in his novel Bewijsmateriaal (Material Evidence, 1978) first appeared as a 4-line poem in his collection Een vis zwemt uit zijn taalgebied (A fish swims out of its meaning area, 1976). The four sentences of De la grammaire anglaise et hollandaise avec un coup de théâtre triste, which are the same in English as in Dutch, are repeated in Zilah (2002). In general, the fantastic situations in these novels flow from a single initial supposition or macguffin. In Zilah (2002) it is the consequences that follow when the heroine buys the rights to the Dutch language as a trademark name; in Waar was je nou (Where were you, 2005), it is the ability to enter a photograph and relive one's own past.

In the case of the poem repeated in Bewijsmateriaal, there was another form of recycling when it was put to use by the artist Klaas Gubbels. There the lines accompany one of the artist's typical coffee pots on a Nijmegen house-end. The mural dates from 1991 and was the winner of the Jurylid Chabotprijs. Later the two co-operated in a joint print-poem art publication, De kan (1995).

== Prizes ==
- 1966 - Poëzieprijs van de gemeente Amsterdam
- 1980 - Cestoda-prijs
- 1983 - Multatuliprijs
- 1990 - Jan Greshoffprijs for Museo sentimental
- 1995 - Zilveren Griffel for 's Nachts op dak
- 1996 - P.C. Hooft-prijs
- 1997 - Pierre Bayle-prijs
- 1999 - Zilveren Griffel for Sok of sprei
- 2006 - Libris Literatuur Prijs for Waar was je nou

== Bibliography ==
- 1963 De waarheid als De Koe (poetry)
- 1964 Barbarber, tijdschrift voor teksten. Een keuze uit dertig nummers (anthology with J. Bernlef and G. Brands)
- 1964 Wat zij bedoelen (with J. Bernlef, interviews with the poet Jan Hanlo)
- 1965 Een klok en profil (poetry)
- 1967 128 vel schrijfpapier (texts with the poet C. Buddingh')
- 1967 Een cheque voor de tandarts (with J. Bernlef)
- 1968 Barbarber, een keuze uit tien jaar, 1958-1968 (with J. Bernlef and G. Brands)
- 1969 Verplaatste tafels, reportages, research, vaudeville (poetry)
- 1971 - Een avond in Amsterdam, tien gesprekken met Ben ten Holter
- 1972 Sonatines door het open raam. Gedichten bij partituren van Clementi, Kuhlau en Lichner (poetry)
- 1974 Holland Dada (art history)
- 1975 Edits Nieuwe woordbeeldingen. Verzamelde gedichten van I.K. Bonset
- 1976 Een vis zwemt uit zijn taalgebied. Tekst en beeld voor witte clown (poetry)
- 1978 Bewijsmateriaal (novel) ISBN 9789021480817
- 1979 Eerste indrukken. Memoires van een driejarige (novel) ISBN 9789021445564
- 1979 Het formaat van Man Ray (text)
- 1980 Een leeuwerik boven een weiland. Een keuze uit de gedichten (selected poems) ISBN 9021480832
- 1982 Beweegredenen (novel) ISBN 9021480840
- 1985 Een liefde in 1947 (novel) ISBN 9021480859
- 1986 De berg en de steenfabriek (essays) ISBN 9021480867
- 1989 Een maan van Saturnus. De film te midden van de kunsten (art criticism) ISBN 9060746376
- 1989 Het witte schoolbord (long story) ISBN 9070066750
- 1989 Museo sentimental (stories and essays) ISBN 9021480875
- 1992 Eb (essays) ISBN 9021480883
- 1993 Vluchtig eigendom (novel) ISBN 9021480891
- 1994 's Nachts op dak (children’s theatre) ISBN 9021480905
- 1995 De vermiste kindertekening (stories and essays) ISBN 9021480808
- 1995 De kan (6 poems accompanied by Klaas Gubbels’ coffee pot prints) ISBN 9072797078
- 1996 Poeder en wind (novel) ISBN 9021480778
- 1997 Henri Plaat presents... (with Betty van Garrel) ISBN 9066171979
- 1998 Sok of sprei (children’s drama) ISBN 902148076X
- 1998 Sprenkelingen (stories and essays) ISBN 9021480751
- 2002 Zilah (novel) ISBN 9021480077
- 2005 Waar was je nou (novel) ISBN 9021480182
- 2005 Het droomhuis (children’s fiction, translated by Andrew May as The Dreamhouse) ISBN 978-9085460381
- 2008 De Hoedenwinkel (novel) ISBN 9021434873
- 2010 De bruid van Marcel Duchamp (art study) ISBN 9789021437798; (French translation as La Mariée de Marcel Duchamp by Camille Richert and Judith Wambacq, 2021) ISBN 9782490505289
- 2010 Op een dag (short story)
- 2011 Tellen en wegen (poetry) ISBN 9789021439570
- 2012 Op de foto (novel) ISBN 9789021442099
- 2013 Voor jou (short story) ISBN 9789021447445
- 2014 Fijn dat u luistert (poetry) ISBN 9789021456072
- 2014 Buiten Beeld (Dutch Poetry Week gift collection)
- 2015 Niet verder vertellen (novel), ISBN 978-90-214-0026-6
