= J. Bernlef =

Dutch writer and translator (1937–2012)

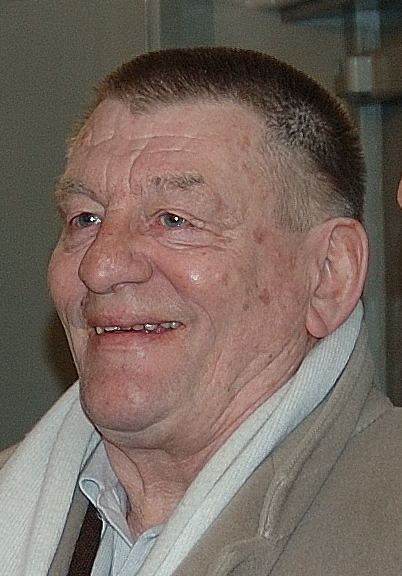
- Bernlef in 2008
- Born: Hendrik Jan Marsman; 14 January 1937; Sint Pancras, Netherlands
- Died: 29 October 2012 (aged 75); Amsterdam, Netherlands
- Occupations: Novelist, poet, translator
- Spouse: Eva Hoornik (m. 1960)
- Writing career
- Pen name: J. Bernlef, Ronnie Appelman, J. Grauw, Cas den Haan, S. den Haan, and Cas de Vries
- Notable awards: Constantijn Huygens Prize (1984); P. C. Hooft Award (1994)
- Website: www.bernlef.net

Hendrik Jan Marsman (14 January 1937 – 29 October 2012), better known by his pen name, J. Bernlef, was a Dutch writer, poet, novelist and translator, much of whose work centres on mental perception of reality and its expression. He won numerous literary awards, including the Constantijn Huygens Prize in 1984 and the P. C. Hooft Award in 1994, both of which were for his work as a whole. His book Hersenschimmen features on the list of NRC's Best Dutch novels.

== Life ==
Marsman was born on 14 January 1937 in Sint Pancras and worked in a number of genres under a variety of pseudonyms, which included Ronnie Appelman, J. Grauw, Cas den Haan, S. den Haan, and Cas de Vries. There had already been a well-known Dutch poet named Hendrik Marsman who had died in 1940, so this Marsman preferred to take the name of an 8th-century blind Frisian poet named Bernlef as his chief nom de plume.

1958 was a key year in Bernlef's life, during which he spent some time in Sweden, enabling him years later to translate Swedish writers; he also co-edited the English language A pulp magazine for the dead generation (under the name Henk Marsman) with the Beat poet Gregory Corso, published from Paris by Piero Heliczer’s The Dead Language Press. Together with two other poets, K. Schippers and G. Brands, he went on to visit the Dada exhibition at the Stedelijk Museum and inspired by that launched with them the seminal magazine Barbarber (1958-71).

In 1960 his first poetry collection, Kokkels (Cockles) was awarded the Reina Prinsen Geerligs-prijs. In that year he married Eva Hoornik, daughter of the poet Ed. Hoornik, by whom he eventually had two children. At the same time, his friend Schippers married her twin sister Erica. Later he began writing novels and became widely known for his Hersenschimmen (translated as Out of Mind) in 1984. He was an industrious writer and shortly before his death a photo showed the pile of his works as equaling him in height.

Bernlef died on 29 October 2012, aged 75, at his home in Amsterdam after a short illness. One tribute paid to Bernlef then hailed him as "one of the greats of Dutch literature." Another, from Sara Whyatt, Deputy Director of PEN International, pointed out that "Henk was not only a distinguished writer himself, but also a great defender of other writers." In the late 1980s, he had taken over as director of The PEN Emergency Fund, a lifeline to writers and their families whose lives had been blighted by prison, threats, torture and censorship, and worked untiringly for their relief.

== Work ==
Barbarber, the magazine set up by Bernlef and his friends in 1958, originally came out in an edition of 100 copies and was filled with Neo-Dadaist gestures, ready-mades and both verbal and pictorial collages. One issue was composed entirely of wallpaper samples. Under Bernlef’s name appeared a shopping list, while another text titled “Door” consists of only the words “Push/Pull”. In their study Een cheque voor de tandarts (A cheque for the dentist, 1967), Bernlef and Schippers mention Marcel Duchamp and Kurt Schwitters as the inspiration of such experiments. The approach of both authors was to suggest disruptive uses of everyday media in order to challenge the view of reality. Schippers’ poem “Jigsaw Puzzles” consists of a series of suggestions for making such puzzles, including “Photograph a completed jigsaw puzzle/ and make a jigsaw puzzle from that". Similarly, Bernlef’s “Uncle Carl: a home movie” fantasizes on ways of playing the movie so as to negate the fact of his uncle’s death.

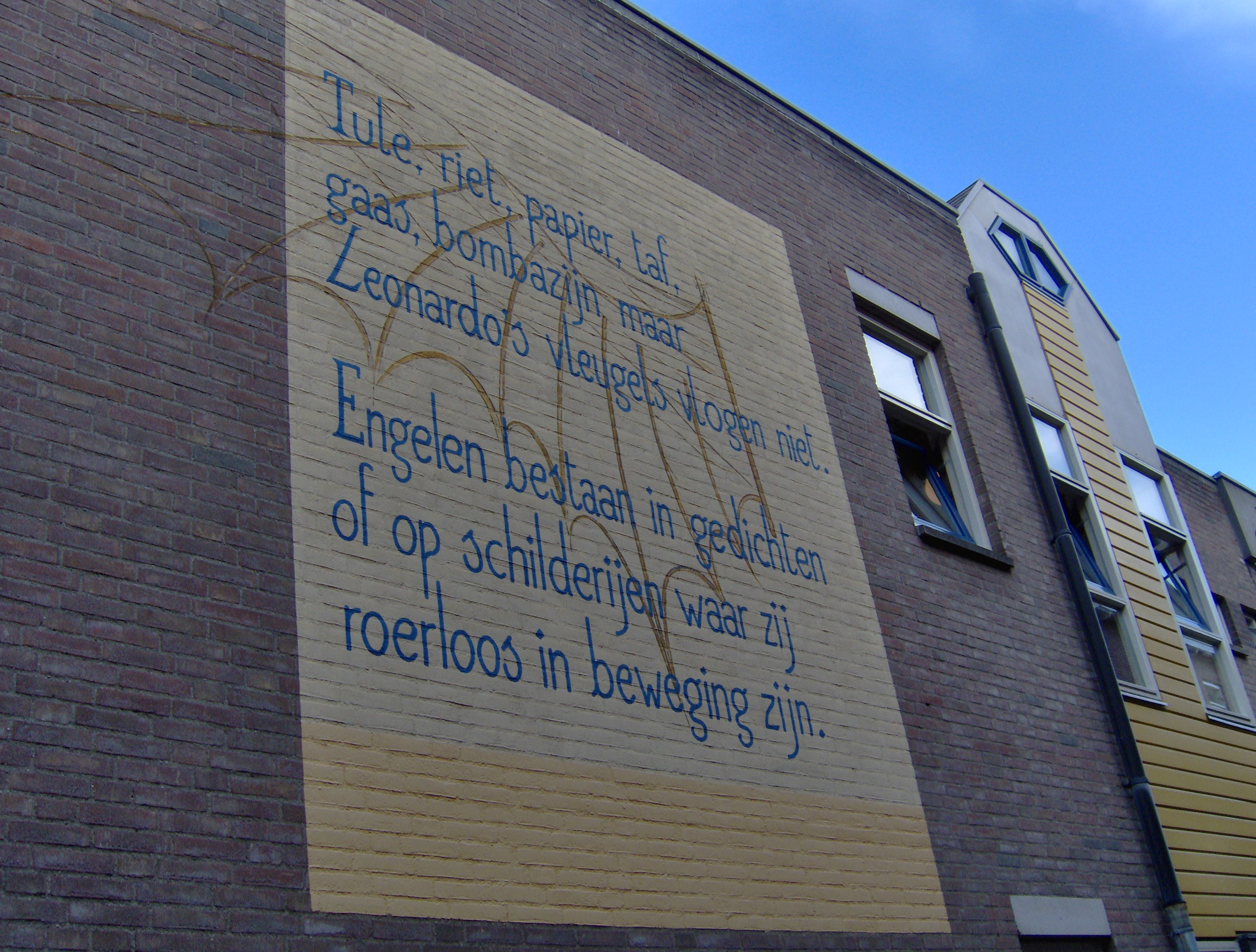
The start of a Bernlef poem on Sint Ursulasteeg in Leiden

Later poems explore problems of perception and expression, often referencing the performance of jazz musicians and artists. One of these was eventually made into a tall mural on a Leiden apartment block.

Tulle, reed, paper, taffeta,
gauze, bombazine but
Leonardo’s wings didn’t fly.

Angels exist in poems
or in paintings where
motionless they are in motion.

Bernlef was later to pursue such themes at greater length in his novels. Hersenschimmen (1984) brought him great success. It was widely translated, filmed in 1987 and produced as a play in 2006. Translated in English as “Out of Mind”, it gives a realistic depiction of the mind’s descent into dementia from the point of view of the sufferer. Eclips (1993) captures the reverse process as the victim of an accident whose mind has been incapacitated slowly returns to normality.

== Awards and honours ==
- 1959: Reina Prinsen Geerligsprijs for Kokkels
- 1962: Poetry prize from the Government of Amsterdam for his second collection, Morene
- 1964: Lucy B. en C.W. van der Hoogtprijs for Dit verheugd verval
- 1964: Poetry prize from the Government of Amsterdam for En dode hagedis
- 1977: Vijverbergprijs for De man in het midden
- 1984: Constantijn Huygens Prize for his oeuvre
- 1987: AKO Literatuurprijs for Publiek geheim
- 1989: Diepzee-prijs for Hersenschimmen
- 1994: P. C. Hooft Award for his oeuvre

== Translated works ==
- Hersenschimmen (1984), translated as Out of Mind (1988) by Adrienne Dixon
- Publiek geheim (1987), translated as Public Secret (1992) by Adrienne Dixon
- Driftwood House, a selection of his poems translated by Scott Rollins (1992)
- Eclips (1993), translated as Eclipse (1996) by Paul Vincent
