= The Following Story =

1991 postmodern novel by Cees Nooteboom

- First edition (Dutch)
- Author: Cees Nooteboom
- Original title: Het volgende verhaal
- Translator: Ina Rilke
- Language: Dutch
- Publisher: De Arbeiderspers
- Publication date: 1991
- Publication place: Netherlands
- English publication date: 1993
- Pages: 92
- ISBN: 90-70066-88-2

The Following Story (Dutch: Het volgende verhaal) is a 1991 postmodern novel by the Dutch writer Cees Nooteboom. Translations into German (Die folgende Geschichte) and French (L'histoire suivante) also appeared that year. After the novel was awarded the 1993 Aristeion European Literary Prize, its English translation appeared in the UK (Harvill, 1993) and USA (Harcourt Brace, 1994).

== Plot ==
Herman Mussert, formerly a schoolteacher of Latin and Greek and later a travel writer, wakes one morning in a hotel room in Lisbon. His last memory had been falling asleep the night before in his Amsterdam apartment, but now he has Portuguese currency in his wallet and room service finds nothing strange in his ordering breakfast. Moreover he remembers the room from a love encounter twenty years before with a colleague’s wife. This had come about when his favourite student, the beautiful and talented Lisa d'India, had an affair with Arend Herfst, another master in the school. In revenge, Herfst's wife Maria Zeinstra, who taught science in the same school, had seduced Mussert. Eventually this leads to a public fight between the two men, after which Herfst drives away with Lisa and she is killed when he crashes the car. In the ensuing scandal, all three teachers are dismissed from the school and Mussert becomes a successful but facile travel writer under the name of Strabo.

Mussert recalls some of this as he wanders about Lisbon and later boards a ship sailing to Brazil and then up the River Amazon. Travelling with him are a Spanish boy, an Italian monastic, an Arabian airline pilot, an English journalist, a Chinese professor and an unidentified woman. One by one the males tell how they had come to die until it is Mussert's turn. The only audience left to him, apart from the readers of the book, is the woman - now revealed as his former star student, Lisa d'India - to whom he relates "the following story".

== Reception ==
The reviewer in The Independent (UK) noted that the novel had won the European Literary Prize and that it was likely to appeal to philosophers and scientists alike, as well as to both classicists and followers of modern literature:

Yet beyond the learning so wittily displayed, there is something deeper that might speak to anyone: a voyage around memory and death, myth and disillusionment. By the end, Nooteboom has shown himself a master of ironic wisdom, but also of elated, elegiac feeling.

Autobiographical elements drawn from Nooteboom's career that are shared by the character Herman Mussert are his Classical education and the fact that he is a travel writer. Though Mussert is deprecatory about his own performance in the latter role, it shows in his skilful but restrained description of Lisbon. Beyond that, his narration is discursive and his performance reveals him as an able phrase-maker and epigrammatist.

In the essay "Memoirs of the Undead" that Douglas Glover devoted to the novel, it is noted that one of its points of departure is Ambrose Bierce's story "An Occurrence at Owl Creek Bridge", with its similar narrative of a man's illusion of escaping his hanging even as it takes place. According to this reading, the entire action of Nooteboom's book is packed into the two seconds that it takes Mussert to die in his Amsterdam apartment, the clues to which begin on the very first page. He comments there on coming to in his Lisbon hotel room that "I had woken up with the ridiculous feeling that I might be dead".

But the theme of death in life turns out to have punctuated all of his existence: a neighbour has the impression that Mussert looks dead when in fact he is concentrating on a book; at school his students refer to him ambivalently as a "dead language teacher". Death also invades the occasions in which Maria and Mussert audit each other's lessons. Maria's deals with the ovulation of the sexton beetle in its mate's corpse; Mussert's with the death of Phaethon. As Mussert comments in one of his philosophical asides, "The world is a never-ending cross-reference". The allied theme of eternal recurrence, rather than linear progression, is discussed by other characters, the whole leading towards the final page in which the audience he addresses is returned to the moment of his death at the start, at which "the following story" begins.

Sinéad Rushe later adapted the novel for a two-person performance, launched in 2001 at the Battersea Arts Centre, London. This describes Mussert as seen through the eyes of the two women who served as "his mistress and his muse".

== See also ==
- 1991 in literature
- Dutch literature
