= Anne Frank Prize =

Dutch literary award

The Anne Frank Prize was a literary award that was given out in the Netherlands in the years 1957 to 1966 by The Netherlands-America Foundation.

The prize was established by Albert Hackett and Frances Goodrich, who had authored a play, The Diary of Anne Frank, based on Anne Frank's The Diary of a Young Girl (Het achterhuis). The play won the Pulitzer prize in 1956. The prize money was to be given to writers under 30 years. The prize was awarded in successive years in the following genres: novel, poetry, drama, essay and short story.

Notable winners include Harry Mulisch and Cees Nooteboom.

== Prize winners ==
- 1966 – Raoul Chapkis: Ik sta op mijn hoofd

- Henk van Kerkwijk: Geweer met terugslag

- 1965 – P.J.A.M. Buijnsters: Tussen twee werelden-Rhijnvis Feith als dichter van Het Graf

- Cornelis Verhoeven: Filosofie van de troost

- 1964 – E. Brent Besemer: (entire oeuvre)

- Peter Oosthoek: for his direction of the play Nederlandse stukken

- 1963 – Peter Berger: Deze voorlopige naam

- Huub Oosterhuis: Uittocht, Groningen en andere gedichten

- 1962 – Ankie Peypers: Geen denken aan

- Geert van Beek: Buiten schot

- 1961 – Piet Calis: Mensen van de koningsstam, Napoleon op het Leidscheplein

- H.J.A. Hofland: (entire oeuvre)

- 1960 – Cornelis Bauer: De groene boogschutter

- Rutger van Zeyst: De familieraad

- 1959 – Erik Vos: for his direction of the play Arena

- Esteban Lopez: Fredegonde, De vrienden van vroeger, Mercedes, mijn zuster, Tederheid in het geding

- 1958 - Remco Campert: Vogels vliegen toch

- Nico Scheepmaker: Poëtisch fietsen, De kip van Egypte

- 1957 – Harry Mulisch: Archibald Strohalm

- Cees Nooteboom: Philip en de anderen
