= Cees Nooteboom =

Dutch novelist, poet and journalist (1933–2026)

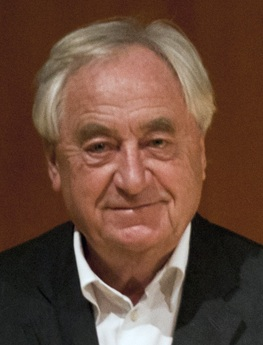
- Nooteboom in 2011
- Born: Cornelis Johannes Jacobus Maria Nooteboom; 31 July 1933; The Hague, Netherlands
- Died: 11 February 2026 (aged 92); Sant Lluís, Balearic Islands, Spain
- Occupations: Novelist; poet; journalist
- Spouse: Fanny Lichtveld (m. 1957; div. 1964)
- Partner: Liesbeth List (1965–1979)
- Writing career
- Language: Dutch
- Period: 1954–2025
- Notable works: Rituals (Rituelen, 1980); The Following Story (Het volgende verhaal, 1991)
- Notable awards: Pegasus Prize; Prix Formentor

Cornelis Johannes Jacobus Maria "Cees" Nooteboom (Dutch pronunciation: [seːs ˈnoːtəboːm]; 31 July 1933 – 11 February 2026) was a Dutch novelist, poet and journalist. After the attention received by his novel Rituals (Rituelen, 1980), which won the Pegasus Prize, it was the first of his novels to be translated into an English-language edition, published in 1983 by Louisiana State University Press (LSU Press) of the United States. LSU Press published his two earlier novels in English in the following years, as well as other works up until 1990. Harcourt (now Houghton Mifflin Harcourt) and Grove Press have since published some of his works in English.

Nooteboom won numerous literary awards and was mentioned as a candidate for the Nobel Prize in literature.

== Life and career ==
Cornelis Johannes Jacobus Maria "Cees" Nooteboom was born on 31 July 1933 in The Hague, Netherlands. His father was killed there in the 1945 bombing of the Bezuidenhout during World War II.

After his mother remarried in 1948, his Catholic stepfather enrolled Nooteboom in several religious secondary schools, including a Franciscan school in Venray and a school run by the Augustinians in Eindhoven. He finished his secondary education at a night school in Utrecht.

After his first job with a bank in Hilversum, Nooteboom travelled throughout Europe. In addition to his independent writing, he worked for the weekly magazine Elsevier, from 1957 to 1960, and at the newspaper de Volkskrant from 1961 to 1968. In 1967, he became the travel editor of the magazine Avenue.

In 1957 Nooteboom was hired as a sailor on a freighter to Suriname in order to earn money and ask for the hand of his first wife, Fanny Lichtveld. They married but later divorced in 1964. Some of his travel experiences are recounted in the book De verliefde gevangene (1958).

He was also in a relationship with the singer Liesbeth List. Nooteboom was until his death married to Simone Sassen and divided his time between Amsterdam, Germany and the island of Menorca.

On 2 September 2019, he was awarded an Honorary Doctorate from UCL, London.

Nooteboom died at his home in Sant Lluís, Menorca, on 11 February 2026, at the age of 92.

== Literary works ==
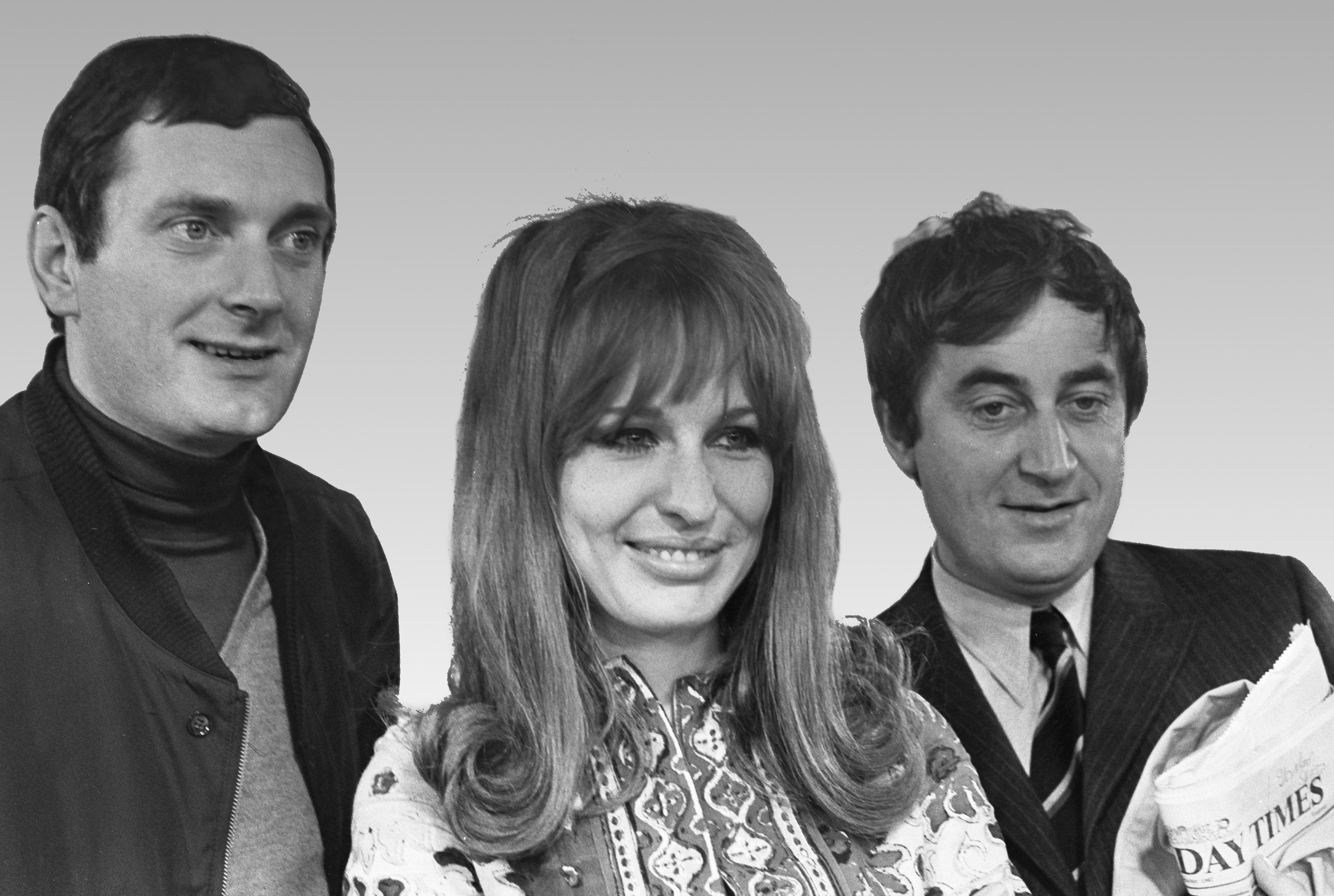
Nooteboom (right, holding the Sunday Times) with his girlfriend singer-actress Liesbeth List and Dutch composer Frans Mijts in Rio de Janeiro 1967

Nooteboom's first novel, Philip en de anderen (Philip and the Others, 1988 English translation), was published in 1954 and won the Anne Frank Prize. His second novel, De ridder is gestorven (1963) (The Knight Has Died, English edition, 1990) was his last for 17 years. During that period, he was working for publications and writing poetry and travel books.

In 1980, his third novel Rituelen (Rituals, 1983) brought him wide acclaim in the Netherlands, winning the Pegasus Prize. It was his first novel to be translated into English and was published by Louisiana State University Press, which published two of his earlier novels in English, as well as others through to 1990.

Other novels by Nooteboom include Een lied van schijn en wezen (A Song of Truth and Semblance, 1984); Allerzielen (1998) (All Souls' Day, 2001), and Paradijs verloren (Paradise Lost, 2007). His best-known work to English-speaking audiences is perhaps The Following Story (Het volgende verhaal, 1991), which was written for the Dutch Boekenweek in 1991. It won the Aristeion Prize in 1993.

Nooteboom was also a well-known travel writer. Some of his travel books include Een middag in Bruay, Een nacht in Tunesië, and De omweg naar Santiago (Roads to Santiago, 1997), an anthology of his writings on Spain. This last book inspired the musical work Six Glosses (2010) by Spanish composer Benet Casablancas. Nooteboom's experiences living in Berlin, Germany, are detailed in the book Berlijn 1989–2009, which collects his earlier books, Berlijnse notities and Terugkeer naar Berlijn, and new material.

The book De omweg naar Santiago inspired several Spanish and Dutch composers. It was the subject of the tournée of concerts celebrated in 2010 in The Netherlands by the Ensemble 88 from Maastricht.

== Bibliography ==
=== Novels and story collections ===
- 1954 Philip en de anderen; (Philip and the Others), English: LSU Press, 1988.
- 1958 De verliefde gevangene
- 1963 De ridder is gestorven; (The Knight Has Died), English: LSU Press, 1990.
- 1980 Rituelen; (Rituals), English: LSU Press, 1983.
- 1981 Een lied van schijn en wezen; (A Song of Truth and Semblance), English: LSU Press, 1984.
- 1982 Mokusei!
- 1984 In Nederland; (In the Dutch Mountains), English: LSU Press, 1987.
- 1986 Het Spaans van Spanje
- 1988 De brief
- 1991 Het volgende verhaal; (The Following Story), English: Harcourt Brace, 1994.
- 1998 Allerzielen; (All Souls' Day), English: Harcourt, 2001.
- 2004 Paradijs verloren; (Lost Paradise), English: Grove Press, 2007.
- 2007 Rode Regen
- 2009 's Nachts komen de vossen; (The Foxes Come at Night), English: MacLehose Press/Quercus, 2011.

=== Poetry ===
- 1956 De doden zoeken een huis
- 1959 Koude gedichten
- 1960 Het zwarte gedicht
- 1964 Gesloten gedichten
- 1970 Gemaakte gedichten
- 1978 Open als een schelp – dicht als een steen
- 1982 Aas. Gedichten
- 1982 Het landschap verteld. Paesaggi narrati
- 1984 Vuurtijd, ijstijd. Gedichten 1955–1983
- 1989 Het gezicht van het oog
- 1991 Water, aarde, vuur, lucht (Water, Earth, Fire, Air)
- 1999 Zo kon het zijn
- 2000 Bitterzoet, honderd gedichten van vroeger en zeventien nieuwe
- 2005 De slapende goden / Sueños y otras mentiras with Lithographs by Jürgen Partenheimer
- 2020 Afscheid, gedicht uit de tijd van het virus

=== Essays and reporting ===
- 1968 De Parijse beroerte
- 1980 Nooit gebouwd Nederland (Unbuilt Netherlands. Rizzoli, 1985)
- 1993 De ontvoering van Europa
- 1993 Zelfportret van een ander. Dromen van het eiland en de stad van vroeger

=== Travel writing ===
- 1963 Een middag in Bruay. Reisverslagen (An Afternoon in Bruay. Travelogues)
- 1965 Een nacht in Tunesië (A Night in Tunisia)
- 1968 Een ochtend in Bahia (One Morning in Bahia)
- 1971 Bitter Bolivia. Maanland Mali
- 1978 Een avond in Isfahan
- 1981 Voorbije passages
- 1983 Waar je gevallen bent, blijf je
- 1985 De zucht naar het Westen
- 1986 De Boeddha achter de schutting. Aan de oever van de Chaophraya
- 1989 De wereld een reiziger
- 1990 Berlijnse notities
- 1991 Vreemd water
- 1992 Roads to Santiago (De omweg naar Santiago). In English: Harcourt Brace, 1997
- 1992 Zurbarán
- 1993 De koning van Suriname
- 1995 Van de lente de dauw. Oosterse reizen
- 1997 De filosoof zonder ogen : Europese reizen
- 1997 Terugkeer naar Berlijn
- 2002 Nootebooms Hotel (Nomad's Hotel. Houghton Mifflin Harcourt, 2009; the German edition with the same title appeared first in 2000)
- 2005 Het geluid van Zijn naam. Reizen door de Islamitische wereld (the German edition with the title Der Laut seines Namens. Reisen durch die islamische Welt appeared first in 2004)
- 2007 Tumbas: graven van dichters en denkers
- 2009 Berlijn 1989/2009
- 2010 Scheepsjournaal

== Awards ==
- 1957 – Anne Frank Prize (for Philip and the Others)
- 1960 – Poetry Prize from the City of Amsterdam (for Ibicenzer gedicht)
- 1960 – ANV-Visser Neerlandia Prize (for De zwanen van de Theems)
- 1963 – Lucy B. en C.W. van der Hoogtprijs (for De ridder is gestorven)
- 1965 – Poetry Prize from the City of Amsterdam (for Gesloten gedichten)
- 1978 – Jan Campert Prize (for Open als een schelp – dicht als een steen)
- 1981 – Ferdinand Bordewijk Prijs (for Rituals)
- 1982 – Cestoda Prize
- 1982 – Pegasus Prize (for Rituals)
- 1985 – Multatuliprijs (for the novel In Nederland)
- 1992 – Constantijn Huygens Prize
- 1993 – Aristeion Prize
- 2002 – Goethe Prize
- 2002 – The Austrian State Prize for European Literature
- 2004 – P.C. Hooft Award
- 2009 – Prijs der Nederlandse Letteren
- 2010 – Gouden Uil for 's Nachts komen de vossen
- 2017 – Mondello Prize
- 2020 – Prix Formentor

In addition to his many literature awards, Nooteboom was awarded honorary doctorates from Radboud University in Nijmegen in 2006 and the Free University of Berlin in 2008.
