= Rodenbach =

Rodenbach may refer to:

- Rodenbach Brewery, a brewery from Roeselare, Belgium

== Places ==
- Rodenbach, Hesse, in the Main-Kinzig district, Hesse, Germany
- Rodenbach, Rhineland-Palatinate, in the district of Kaiserslautern, Rhineland-Palatinate, Germany
- Rodenbach bei Puderbach, in the district of Neuwied, Rhineland-Palatinate, Germany

== Rivers ==
- Rodenbach (Eisbach), a river in Rhineland-Palatinate, Germany
- Rodenbach (Wapelbach), a river in North Rhine-Westphalia, Germany

== People ==
- Georges Rodenbach (1855–1898), Belgian author
- Albrecht Rodenbach (1856–1880), Belgian author

== See also ==
- Rodenbachfonds, a Flemish non-profit cultural organisation for the promotion and support of the Dutch language in Flanders, named after Albrecht Rodenbach
