= Pillarisation =

Division of civil society along religio-political lines

Pillarisation (a calque from the Dutch: verzuiling [vɛrˈzœylɪŋ]) is a form of voluntary social segregation in which a society becomes arranged into several self-contained communities, or "pillars" (Dutch: zuilen), associated with specific political or confessional identities. The phenomenon is most closely associated with the Netherlands and Belgium in the 19th and 20th centuries.

In a pillarized society, a "pillar" is characterised by a self-contained network of institutions and social organisations which exist entirely separately from those of other "pillars". These have historically included trade unions, social clubs, farmers' associations, savings banks, co-operative shops, schools, hospitals, mutual organisations, universities, scouting groups, sports clubs and newspapers as well as political parties. It therefore limits interaction between members of different pillars even without significant residential segregation. Social relationships, including marriage, between people within different pillars were generally discouraged.

Society in the Netherlands was historically divided into four main pillars: Catholic, Protestant, socialist, and liberal. Belgium, by contrast, only Catholic, socialist, and liberal pillars emerged. The system allowed each community to maintain its own institutions and lifestyle, minimising conflict among groups. Pillarisation in both countries began to decline in the 1960s and 1970s through the weakening of social and political barriers. However, traces of pillarisation remain visible in contemporary Dutch political parties, media institutions, and in certain conservative religious communities, such as those in the Dutch Bible Belt.

Comparable systems of social segmentation have been identified in other countries, including Northern Ireland, Switzerland, Austria, Cyprus, Lebanon, and Malaysia.

== Pillarisation in the Netherlands ==
I know it all sounds most complicated, but you must realise that in the Netherlands we have always had a "pillarised" view of society—the roof held up by an assortment of pillars. Everyone belongs to some political party or Church which represents one of those pillars.

— Gerhardus van Beek of NOS, 1972

The Netherlands historically developed at least three main social pillars: Protestant, Catholic, and social democratic. Pillarisation in the country was initiated in the late 19th century by Abraham Kuyper, a theologian and politician associated with the Anti-Revolutionary Party (ARP), a Christian democratic and neo-Calvinist (gereformeerd) organisation connected to the Reformed Churches in the Netherlands. The movement was grounded in Kuyper's philosophy of sphere sovereignty, which held that distinct areas of life—such as religion, politics, and education—should operate autonomously within their own spheres.

Although pillarisation declined in the 1960s and 1970s, its influence remains evident in Dutch society, particularly in communities outside the Randstad region, where aspects of pillarised life persist alongside broader participation in civil society.

The Catholic pillar was historically the most tightly organised, reflecting the Catholic clergy's encouragement of collective organisation within confessional institutions. The conservative Protestant pillar and the socialist pillar, which primarily represented the proletariat, were also highly cohesive. The Christian Historical Union (CHU), founded in 1908 and associated with the Dutch Reformed Church (hervormd), aligned itself with the Protestant pillar shaped by the ARP rather than creating a separate structure.

Those outside the three main pillars—primarily middle and upper-class latitudinarian Protestants and atheists—were sometimes grouped into a liberal or "general" pillar. However, ties among liberal organisations were considerably weaker than within the other pillars. Liberals generally opposed the voluntary segregation of society and often denied that a liberal pillar existed. The political parties commonly linked with this group included the Free-thinking Democratic League (VDB) and the Liberal State Party (LSP). Smaller groups such as communists, humanists, and Protestant fundamentalists also established their own organisations, though on a much smaller scale.

The growth of pillarisation in the Netherlands was supported by two parallel developments: the emancipation of the working and lower middle classes and the efforts of elites to maintain influence. The working-class emancipation led to the creation of socialist parties, trade unions, newspapers, cooperatives, and leisure organisations that provided comprehensive social support to their members, similar to patterns observed elsewhere in Europe. The rise of the Protestant pillar reflected the mobilisation of the conservative, often strongly religious lower middle class. While the Dutch bourgeoisie tended to espouse liberal or moderate Protestant beliefs, large segments of the lower middle class followed Kuyper's neo-Calvinism, which was both more traditional and more accessible to ordinary people than the established Protestant churches.

Kuyper's doctrine of sphere sovereignty rejected both ecclesiasticism (the idea of church dominance over all social spheres) and statist secularism (the idea of state dominance over all spheres), arguing instead for distinct, autonomous domains within society. In 1879, Kuyper founded the Anti-Revolutionary Party (ARP) as the political expression of his religious movement and as the institutional foundation of the Protestant pillar.

Meanwhile, elites sought to retain control over emerging social movements: for example, Catholic clergy established confessional trade unions to prevent Catholic workers from joining socialist organisations. The creation of Christian political parties also reflected an effort to counterbalance the expanding influence of left-wing mass movements.

=== Institutions by pillar ===
The following table shows the most important institutions by pillar:

	Protestant	Catholic	Socialist	Liberal
Political party before 1945	ARP (from 1879; gereformeerd); CHU (from 1908; hervormd); SGP (from 1918; bevindelijk gereformeerd)	AB (1904–1926); RKSP (1926–1945)	SDAP (from 1894)	LU (1885–1921; mainstream Freethinking); VDB (from 1901 left-wing Freethinking); BVL (1906–1921; old Freethinking); LSP (from 1921; right-wing Freethinking)
Political parties after 1945	ARP (until 1977); CHU (until 1977); CDA (from 1977; oecumenisch); GPV (1948–2001; gereformeerd-vrijgemaakt); RPF (1975–2001; orthodox Protestant); CU (from 2001; orthodox Protestant); SGP	KVP (until 1977); CDA (from 1977; ecumenical)	PvdA (from 1945)	PvdV (1946–1948; Liberal-conservative Freethinking); VVD (from 1948; Liberal-conservative Freethinking); D66 (from 1966; Liberal Freethinking)
Broadcasting organisation	NCRV (Dutch Christian Radio Association); EO (Evangelical Broadcasting)	KRO (Catholic Radio Broadcasting Organisation); RKK Omroep (Roman Catholic Communion Broadcasting)	VARA (Association of Workers' Radio Amateurs)	AVRO (General United Radio Broadcasting Organisation); VPRO (Liberal Protestant Radio Broadcasting); VRON (Free Radio Broadcasting Netherlands); TROS (Television & Radio Broadcasting Organisation)
Unions	CNV (Christian National Union) (from 1909); NWV Patrimonium (gereformeerd) (from 1876)	NKV (Dutch Catholic Union) (1925–1976); FNV (from 1976)	NVV (Dutch Alliance of Unions) (1906–1976); FNV (from 1976); ANWV (General Dutch Workers' Unions) (from 1871)	
Employers	PCW	NKW	none	VNO
Newspapers	De Standaard (gereformeerd); Friesch Dagblad (Fryslân gereformeerd); Trouw (gereformeerd); Nederlands Dagblad (vrijgemaakt); Reformatorisch Dagblad (gereformeerd)	De Tijd (1845–1974); De Volkskrant (since 1919)	Het Vrije Volk; Het Parool	Staatscourant (Public journal); Algemeen Handelsblad (until 1970); Nieuwe Rotterdamsche Courant (until 1970); NRC Handelsblad (from 1970); De Telegraaf
Schools	"School with bible" (Protestant oriented school), Protestant Education	Roman Catholic School	Free Schools, Public Schools	Public Schools
Universities	Protestantse Theologische Universiteit (hervormd); Vrije Universiteit Amsterdam (gereformeerd); Theological University of the Christian Reformed Churches (bevindelijk gereformeerd); Theologische Universiteit (vrijgemaakt)	Radboud Universiteit; Katholieke Universiteit Brabant	State-sponsored universities; Universiteit voor Humanistiek; Nyenrode Business Universiteit	
Hospitals	Green/Orange Cross	White/Yellow Cross	Green Cross	
Sport clubs	NCSU; NSA; TvA	NKS; NSA	NASB; NRS; NCS; NSA	NOC*NSF
Recreation (examples)	Saturday football, weekend rugby union	Sunday football	Dancing schools, Sunday football, korfball	Folk dancing, weekend rugby union, field hockey, weekend football

=== Depillarisation ===
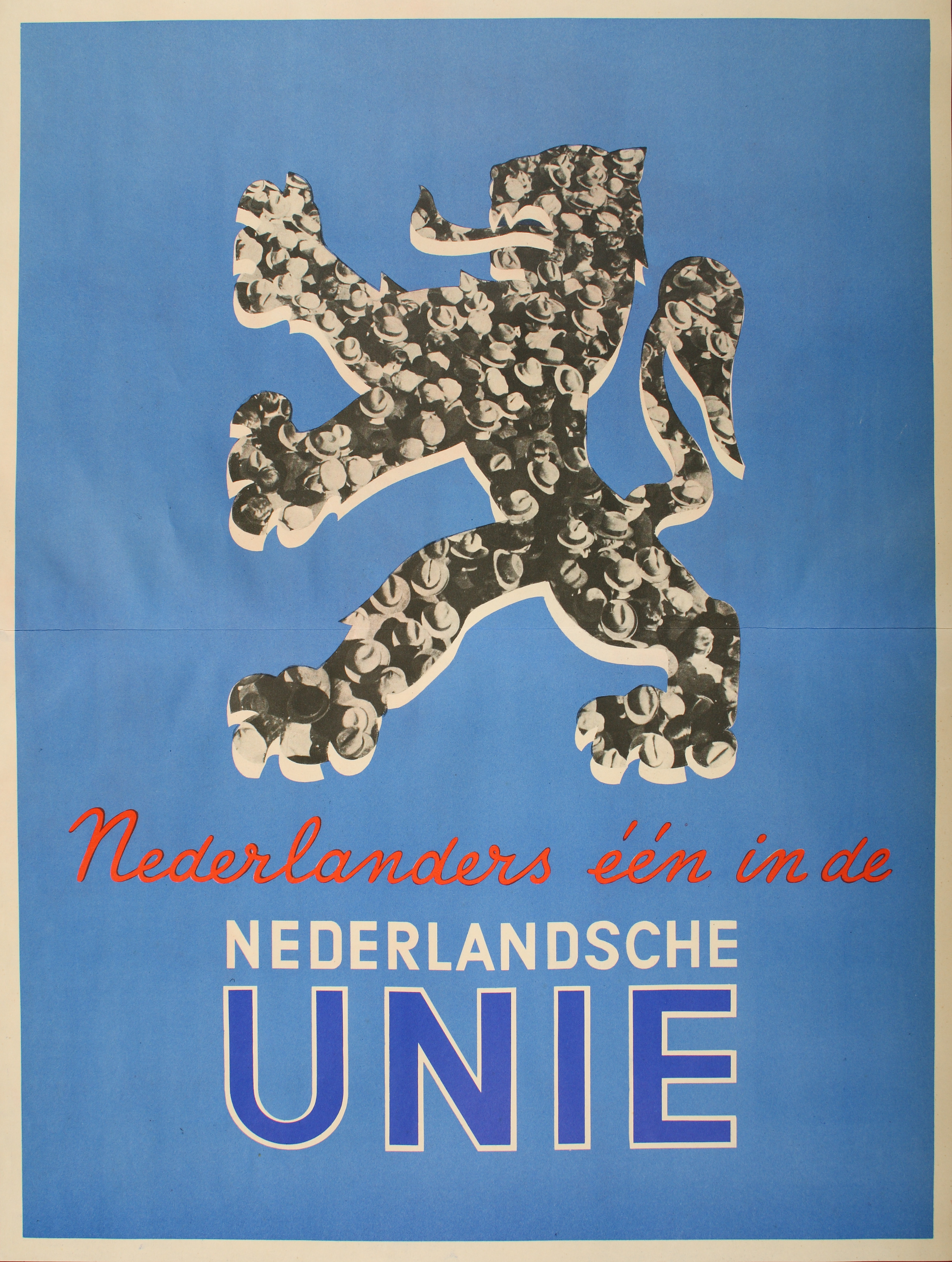
Poster of the Nederlandsche Unie, an anti-pillarisation group that was at first embraced by the German occupying administration but later banned in 1941

After World War II, during which the Dutch resistance itself was divided along pillarised lines, political and social groups from across the spectrum—including liberals, socialists, Protestants, and Catholics—began questioning the existing pillarised system. In response, they founded the People’s Movement (Nederlandse Volksbeweging), a unity initiative intended to renew the political landscape through what became known as the doorbraak ("breakthrough") movement. Participants from various ideological backgrounds, including members of the Catholic resistance group Christofoor, sought to overcome divisions between the pillars and create a more integrated society.

Despite these efforts, the entrenched nature of pillarisation limited the movement's success. To promote unity, the Social Democratic Workers’ Party, the left-liberal Free-thinking Democratic League, and the Christian-socialist Christian Democratic Union merged to form the Labour Party (Partij van de Arbeid, PvdA), a progressive party intended to be open to all citizens. However, the PvdA failed to attract significant support from Catholic and Reformed voters and became primarily associated with the socialist pillar.

In the early years of radio and television broadcasting, pillarisation also influenced the organisation of media. While Dutch broadcasters were divided along pillar lines, the separation in television was relatively limited, as all broadcasters shared the Netherlands' single national television channel (expanded to two channels after 1964), which was viewed by the entire audience.

The 1960s marked a period of major social and political transformation. The pillars began to dissolve under criticism from emerging political movements, notably Democrats 66 (D66) and the New Left (Nieuw Links) faction within the PvdA. Rising mobility, affluence, and educational opportunities enabled greater contact among citizens from different backgrounds, reducing perceived differences between groups. Younger generations increasingly rejected affiliation with pillarised institutions, leading to the gradual decline of the system.

Between 1973 and 1980, the Anti-Revolutionary Party and the Christian Historical Union—both Protestant—merged with the Catholic People's Party to form the Christian Democratic Appeal (CDA). The new party first contested the 1977 Dutch general election. Similarly, cooperation between the Dutch Catholic Trade Union Federation (NKV) and the socialist Dutch Confederation of Trade Unions (NVV) began in 1976, culminating in their merger as the Federation of Dutch Trade Unions in 1982.

Although formal pillarisation diminished, its influence persisted into the 21st century. The Dutch public broadcasting system remains organised along multiple association-based lines rather than as a single entity. The country also continues to maintain both public and religious schools, a division rooted in pillarisation-era education policies.

Certain communities continue to exhibit pillar-like characteristics. As of 2014, members of the Reformed Churches in the Netherlands (Liberated) maintain their own schools, a national newspaper, and other organisations such as a labour union. Several pietist Reformed groups have similarly established their own schools, press outlets, and political movements. Muslim communities have increasingly utilised legal frameworks originally designed for pillarised institutions to create their own educational establishments.

Residual effects of pillarisation are still reflected in voting patterns. For example, regions that were historically Catholic strongholds often show distinctive political tendencies, including higher support for populist parties in contemporary elections.

== Pillarisation in Belgium ==
Pillarisation in Belgium closely resembled that of the Netherlands, though it developed without a Protestant pillar, as the Protestant population was relatively small. There was also no "general" pillar, but a politically organised liberal pillar existed alongside the Catholic and later the Socialist pillars. In 1911, the British sociologist Seebohm Rowntree noted that in Belgium:

There is extraordinarily little social intercourse between Catholics and Liberals, and practically none between Catholics and Socialists. Politics enter into almost every phase of social activity and philanthropic effort, and it is the exception rather than the rule for persons holding different political opinions to co-operate in any other matter. Thus in one town there will be a Catholic, a Liberal and a Socialist trade union, a Catholic, a Liberal and a Socialist thrift society, each catering for similar people, but each confining its attentions to members of its own political party. The separation extends to cafes, gymnasia, choral, temperance, and literary societies; indeed it cuts through life!

In both Flanders and Wallonia, societies were pillarised between Catholic and Liberal political denominations which were subsequently joined by a Socialist pillar. While liberal influence in Belgium—particularly in Brussels—was stronger than in the Netherlands, it remained limited by the liberals' relatively small, middle-class base of support. Liberal trade unions were correspondingly small. The financial daily De Tijd is associated with liberal readers, while Het Laatste Nieuws, a Flemish newspaper, also has historical liberal roots.

Denominational schools, mainly Catholic and a few Jewish, receive partial public funding, though not full parity with state schools as in the Netherlands, so that tuition is almost entirely free. Belgian universities charge comparable, relatively low tuition fees across the board.

During the latter half of the twentieth century, Belgium's long-standing language struggle led to the division of existing pillars along language lines, creating separate Flemish/Dutch, Walloon/French, and German-speaking segments within the Catholic, Liberal, and Socialist pillars. This linguistic split became the dominant source of societal division. The pillar system remained a central organising force in Belgian society for a longer period than in the Netherlands. It only began to decline near the end of the Cold War, particularly at the individual level, though its institutional influence persisted.

Political movements that emerged in the late 20th century, such as Vlaams Blok, Vlaams Belang, Groen, and the New Flemish Alliance, did not attempt to build new pillars.

Traces of pillarisation have also been visible in everyday social life. Musical groups, sports clubs, and recreational associations were often organised along pillar lines. Although weakened in contemporary Belgium, many large social organisations—including trade unions and cooperatives—continue to operate within the traditional boundaries of the pillar system. Elements of pillarisation have continued to shape Belgian politics. For instance, the 1999–2003 Rainbow Coalition led by Guy Verhofstadt was often described using the framework of pillarisation.

=== Institutions by pillar with their ethnic divisions ===
The following table is limited to the most important institutions and it shows the current division of everyone by the three ethnic groups.

	Flemish Catholic	Walloon Catholic	German Catholic	Flemish Socialist	Walloon Socialist	German Socialist	Flemish Liberal	Walloon Liberal	German Liberal
Political parties before 1945	Catholic Party (until 1936); Catholic Bloc (since 1936)			Belgian Labour Party (BWP/POB)			Liberal Party		
Political parties before 1945	Catholic Flemish People's Party (since 1936)	Social Catholic Party (since 1936)		Belgian Labour Party (BWP/POB)			Liberal Party		
Political parties between 1945 and 1970	Christian Social Party (CVP/PSC)			Belgian Socialist Party (BSP/PSB)			Liberal Party (until 1961); Party for Freedom and Progress (PVV/PLP/PFF) (since 1961)		
Political parties after 1970	CVP (until 2001); CD&V (since 2001); minor: VCP (2007–2014); NCD (2012)	PSC (until 2002); CDH (2002–2022); Les Engagés (since 2022); minor: MCC (since 1998); CDF (2002–2012)	CSP minor: PDB (until 2008); ProDG (since 2008)	SP (until 2001); SP.A (2001–2021); Forward (since 2021)	PS	SP	PVV (until 1992); VLD (1992–2007); Open VLD (since 2007)	PRL (since 2002 part of MR); MR (since 2002)	PFF
Trade unions	Confederation of Christian Trade Unions (ACV/CSC)			General Federation of Belgian Labour (ABVV/FGTB)			General Confederation of Liberal Trade Unions of Belgium (ACLVB/CGSLB)		
Trade unions	Boerenbond								
Health insurance	Christelijke Mutualiteit	Mutualité chrétienne	Christliche Krankenkasse	Socialistische Mutualiteit	Mutualité socialiste	Sozialistische Krankenkasse	Liberale Mutualiteit	Mutualité Libérale	Freie Krankenkasse
Hospitals	White/Yellow Cross	Christian Fund	Christian Fund	(Center for) Homecare	Socialist Fund	Socialist Fund	Solidarity for the Family	Liberal Fund	Liberal Fund
Aid agencies	Caritas Vlaanderen	Caritas en Belgique francophone et germanophone	Caritas en Belgique Francophone-Deutschsprachiges Belgien	FOS-Socialistische Solidariteit	Solidarité Socialiste-FCD	Solidariteit-FCD	none	none	none
Newspapers	De Standaard; Gazet van Antwerpen; Het Volk; Het Belang van Limburg; Het Nieuwsblad	La Libre Belgique	Grenz-Echo	Vooruit (until 1978); Volksgazet (until 1978); De Morgen (since 1978)	Le Peuple (until 1998); Le Matin (1998-2001)	none	Het Laatste Nieuws; De Tijd	Le Soir	none
Cultural associations	Davidsfonds	none	none	Vermeylenfonds	none	none	Willemsfonds	none	none
Schools	Flemish Secretariat for Catholic Education (Catholic Schools), Flemish Association of Catholic Colleges	Catholic schools	Public schools	Public schools	Public schools	Public schools, non-denominational private schools	Public schools, non-denominational private schools	Public schools, non-denominational private schools	
Major universities	Katholieke Universiteit Leuven	Université catholique de Louvain	none	Ghent University	University of Liège	none	Vrije Universiteit Brussel	Université libre de Bruxelles	none
Other universities	University of Antwerp; Industriële Hogeschool Brabant; Hogeschool-Universiteit; Vlaams Verbond van Katholieke Hogescholen; Vesalius College; Institute of Tropical Medicine Antwerp	Université de Namur; Facultés Universitaires Catholiques de Mons; Facultés universitaires Saint-Louis	none	Trans-Universiteit Limburg	Faculté Universitaire des Sciences Agronomiques de Gembloux	none	Erasmus Hogeschool	Université de Mons	none
Youth organisations	KVHV; JONGCD&V; Katholische Academische Verbindung Leuven; SGV; Chiro; KSJ-KSA-VKSJ; KLJ; KAJ	FSC; GCB; Jeunes cdH	Die Junge Mitte; FSC; GCB	Rode Valken; Animo Jong Links	MJS	MJS	FOS; VLDJONG	SGP; Les Jeunes Réformateurs	JFF; SGP; MJS
Banks	Volksdepositokas Spaarbank	Dexia	none	Bank van De Post	Banque de La Poste	Bank von der Post	Generale Bankmaatschappij	Générale de Banque	Generale Bank
Sport clubs	Sporta; Gym & Dans Vlaanderen	none	none	AVB (1919–2000); FROS (1976–2000); VASCO (1993–2000); FROS Amateursportconfederatie vzw (since 2000)	none	none	none	none	none
Women's organisations	Femma	Vie féminine	Frauenliga	ZIJKant; Rebelle	Soralia	none	Vvvuur	FNFL	none

== Similar concepts in other countries ==
=== Proporz in Austria ===
The Austrian version of pillarisation is the Proporz system (a hypocorism for Proportionalität, German for 'proportionality'). A political structure of the second Austrian republic, it later evolved into a neo-corporatist system characterised by widespread patronage and nepotism that extended into many areas of Austrian society.

The Proporz system was developed and maintained by the two dominant political parties: the Austrian People’s Party (ÖVP), representing Catholic and conservative interests, and the Socialist Party of Austria (SPÖ), renamed the Social Democratic Party of Austria in 1991. This de facto two-party system collapsed after the 1999 Austrian legislative election, when the far-right Freedom Party of Austria (FPÖ) joined the government. The FPÖ's earlier marginalisation—along with that of its predecessor, the Federation of Independents—had been one of the reasons for establishing the Proporz system, due to their pro-German, far-right and individualist views.

The Proporz system emerged from a desire for stable, consensus-based governance during Austria's post–World War II reconstruction period. It was closely associated with the grand coalitions in which the SPÖ and the ÖVP have shared governmental responsibilities.

As in the Netherlands and Belgium, Austria's main political blocs created extensive parallel structures within civil society. Many organisations reflected this dual alignment: for example, automobile clubs such as the ÖAMTC (aligned with the ÖVP) and ARBÖ (aligned with the SPÖ), rival factions within the Austrian Trade Union Federation (ÖGB) such as the FCG, FSG, and Freiheitlichen Arbeitnehmer (FPÖ), and sports associations like Sportunion and ASKÖ. These "black" (ÖVP-aligned) and "red" (SPÖ-aligned) institutions illustrate the persistence of Proporz as a defining feature of Austria's social and political organisation.

=== Italy ===
A comparable form of pillarisation existed in Italy during the period of the First Italian Republic.

Multiple trade unions were aligned with different political parties and ideologies. The Italian Confederation of Trades Unions maintained close ties with Christian Democracy, while the Italian General Confederation of Labour was associated with the Italian Communist Party. The General Labour Union was linked to the Italian Social Movement, and the Italian Labour Union had connections with the Italian Republican Party and the Italian Democratic Socialist Party.

The state-owned public broadcaster RAI was also divided along party lines. Rai 1 was generally regarded as being close to Christian Democracy, Rai 2 to the Italian Socialist Party, and Rai 3 to the Italian Communist Party.

=== Northern Ireland ===
The term "pillarisation" has also been applied to describe the segregation between the two principal ethno-religious communities in Northern Ireland, particularly between the establishment of Northern Ireland in 1922 and the end of The Troubles (1969–1998). Although both segregation and elements of pillarisation continue to exist, they have been gradually declining.

A distinctive feature of pillarisation in Northern Ireland was the imbalance of power between the two groups. The Protestant–Unionist–Loyalist population held clear political, economic, and social dominance over the Catholic–Nationalist–Republican community. This dynamic has been characterised as a form of pillarisation "without consociationalism", meaning that, unlike in the Netherlands or Belgium, social separation existed without an accompanying system of power-sharing or institutional balance between the communities.

People	Protestants	Catholics
National identity	"British", "Northern Irish" or "Ulster"	"Irish" or "Northern Irish"
Religions	Church of Ireland; Presbyterianism; Methodism	Roman Catholicism
Political persuasions	Unionism; Loyalism; Ulster nationalism Protestant Irish nationalism	Irish nationalism Irish republicanism Dissident republican Éire Nua
Political parties	Democratic Unionist Party; Ulster Unionist Party; Traditional Unionist Voice; Progressive Unionist Party	Sinn Féin; Social Democratic and Labour Party; Workers' Party; Aontú; Republican Sinn Féin; Irish Republican Socialist Party; Nationalist Party (before 1977)
Fraternal organisations	Apprentice Boys of Derry; Orange Order; Independent Orange Order; Royal Arch Purple; Royal Black Institution	Ancient Order of Hibernians; Knights of Saint Columbanus
Unions	Ulster Workers' Council	Irish Congress of Trade Unions
Languages	English, Ulster Scots; British Sign Language, Northern Ireland Sign Language	English and Irish; Irish Sign Language, Northern Ireland Sign Language
Schools	Protestant schools, state schools	Catholic schools
Universities	Queen's University of Belfast; Magee College; Ulster University; Stranmillis University College; Universities in Great Britain	Ulster University; St Mary's University College, Belfast; Universities in the Republic of Ireland
Sports	Rugby union Cricket; Field hockey Association football (most clubs)	Gaelic football Hurling and camogie Association football (Cliftonville, Derry City; Belfast Celtic until 1949)
Banks	Ulster Bank; Belfast Banking Company (to 1970); Northern Bank (to 2012)	Bank of Ireland; Hibernian Bank (to 1958)
Newspapers	Belfast Telegraph; News Letter; Sunday Life; Northern Whig (until 1963); Protestant Telegraph (1966–82)	The Irish News; An Phoblacht; Lá (1984–2008)
TV and radio	BBC Northern Ireland; UTV; BBC Radio Ulster; Pirate radio: Voice of Ulster, Radio Orange, Radio Shankill, Radio Sundown, Radio Free Ulster	RTÉ (Republic of Ireland state broadcaster); Pirate radio: Radio Free Belfast, Radio Free Derry

Since the Good Friday Agreement of 1998, various efforts have been made to reduce segregation in Northern Ireland. "Cross-community" political parties such as the Alliance Party, the Green Party, and People Before Profit exist and an increasing number of voters now identify as "other" rather than aligning with traditional Catholic or Protestant identities. There has also been a rise in the number of people identifying as atheists.

Despite these developments, elections in Northern Ireland are often characterised as a "sectarian head-count", with concerns growing among some members of the Protestant community about the potential emergence of a Catholic majority.

Historically, other non-sectarian political organisations also operated in Northern Ireland, including the Northern Ireland Labour Party and the Northern Ireland Women's Coalition.

=== Finland ===
In Finland, particularly between 1918 and the 1960s, parallel organizational and cultural spheres emerged for the labor movement and bourgeois society. The press, the retail sector, and cultural and sports clubs split into two camps. The labor movement and bourgeois civic activity developed, in part, separately from one another.

== See also ==
- Balkanization
- Confessionalism (politics)
- Consociationalism
- Identity politics
- Millet (Ottoman Empire)
- National Pact, Lebanon
- Political particularism
- Sectarianism
- Social environment
- Social stratification
- Sui iuris
- Test Act
