= Jean-Baptist David =

Dutch canon and professor

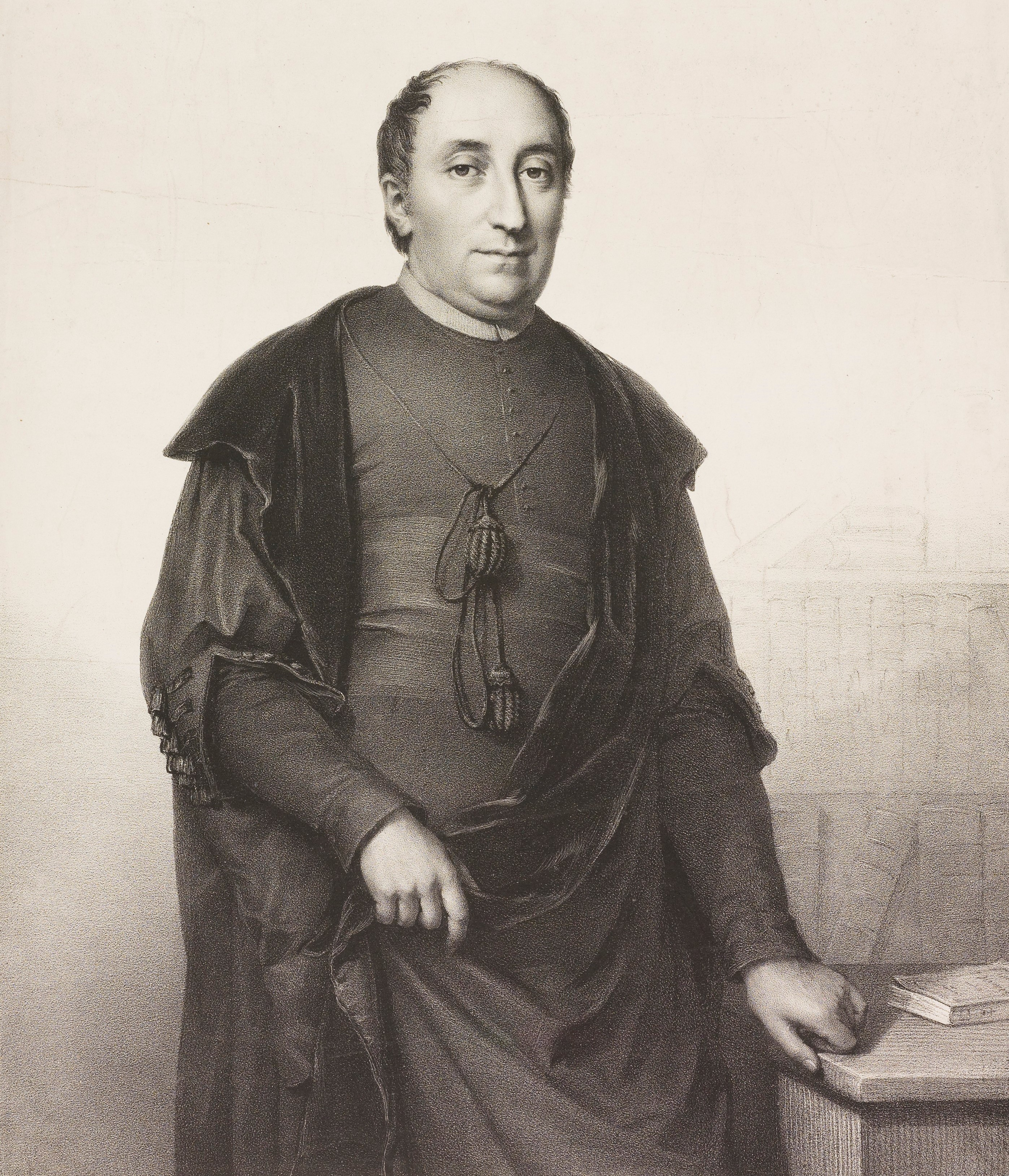
Jean-Baptist David

Jean-Baptist David (25 January 1801, Lier – 24 March 1866, Leuven) was a canon and professor of Dutch and history at the Katholieke Universiteit Leuven.

Jean-Baptist David was born in the Belgian city of Lier. As a professor he worked together with Jan Frans Willems and was president of the first and second Taelcongres that resulted in the language unity between the Netherlands and Flanders. He was the editor of the first united Dutch dictionary, that was published in 1864. He also wrote several books on the history of Flanders, and produced the first modern edition of the works of Jan van Ruusbroec (5 vols., Maetschappy der Vlaemsche Bibliophilen, Ghent, 1858–1868). He died in 1866 in Leuven.

To his honour, the Davidsfonds was founded in 1875 with the purpose to promote the Flemish literature, culture and history.

== Bibliography ==
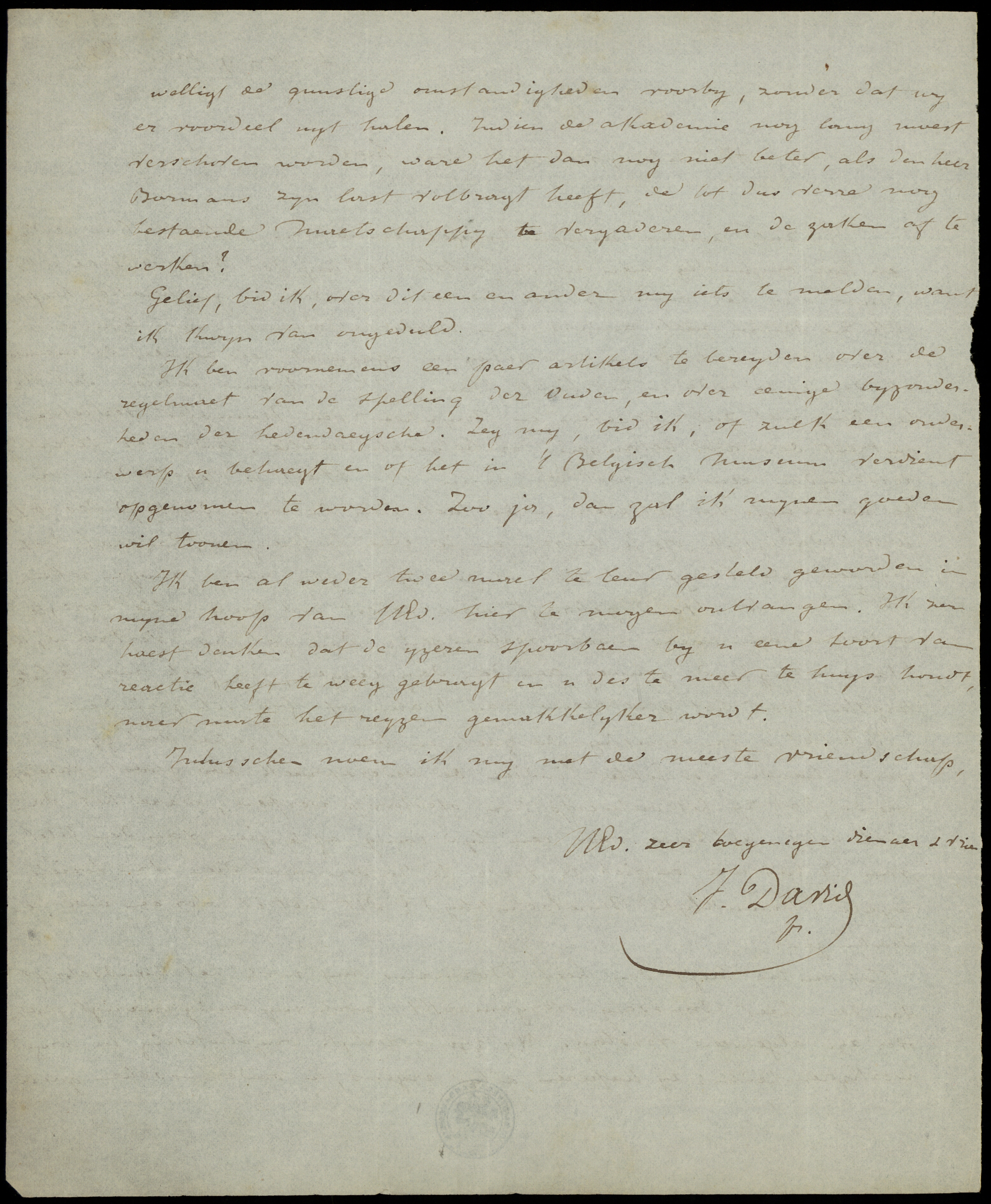
Letter by Jean-Baptist David (1839)

- Vaderlandsche historie (11 volumes) (1842–1866)
  - Vaderlandsche historie. Deel 1 (1842–1866)
  - Vaderlandsche historie. Deel 2 (1842–1866)
  - Vaderlandsche historie. Deel 3 (1842–1866)
  - Vaderlandsche historie. Deel 4 (1842–1866)
  - Vaderlandsche historie. Deel 5 (1842–1866)
  - Vaderlandsche historie. Deel 6 (1842–1866)
  - Vaderlandsche historie. Deel 7 (1842–1866)
  - Vaderlandsche historie. Deel 8 (1842–1866)
  - Vaderlandsche historie. Deel 9 (1842–1866)
  - Vaderlandsche historie. Deel 10 (1842–1866)
  - Vaderlandsche historie. Deel 11 (1842–1866)
- Geschiedenis van Sint-Albertus van Leuven (1843)
- Geschiedenis van de stad en de heerlykheid van Mechelen (1854)
- Nederduytsche spraekkunst (2 vol., 1833–1835)
- Van Maerlants Rymbybel (4 vol. 1858-1864)
- Werken van Jan van Ruusbroec (5 vol., 1858–1868), completed by F. A. Snellaert

== See also ==
- Flemish literature

== Sources ==
- Jean-Baptist David (Dutch)
- Jean-Baptist David (Dutch)
- Jean-Baptist David (Dutch)

Media related to Jan Baptist David at Wikimedia Commons
