= Flemish Movement =

Regionalist movement in Flanders, Belgium

Flemish strijdvlag as adopted by large parts of the Flemish Movement

The Flemish Movement (Dutch: Vlaamse Beweging, pronounced [ˈvlaːmsə bəˈʋeːɣɪŋ]) is an umbrella term which encompasses various political groups in the Belgian region of Flanders and, less commonly, in French Flanders. Ideologically, it encompasses groups which have sought to promote Flemish culture and the Dutch/Flemish language as well as those seeking greater political autonomy for Flanders within Belgium. It also encompasses nationalists who seek the secession of Flanders from Belgium, either through outright independence or unification with the Netherlands. It has historically also been referred to as flamingantisme in French and Dutch.

In the 19th century, the Flemish Movement emerged around a form of cultural patriotism which celebrated the regional traditions and history of Flanders and sought equal status for Dutch in the Belgian nation-state, often under the auspices of the Catholic Church. Although gaining a number of its initial objectives, it became increasingly radical in the aftermath of World War I. Inspired by authoritarian and fascist politics, it was widely discredited for its collaboration in German-occupied Belgium during World War II. However, it re-emerged in the post-war period under the auspices of the Volksunie (1954–2002) and increasingly permeated into other parties in Flanders. It played an important role in Belgium's transformation into a federal state through the 1970s and 1980s.

The Flemish Movement's right wing is dominated by right-wing nationalist organizations such as Vlaams Belang, Voorpost, Nationalistische Studentenvereniging (Nationalist Students Union), and several others. The most radical group on the left side is the socialist and Flemish independentist Flemish-Socialist Movement. The militant wing also still comprises several moderate groups such as the New Flemish Alliance (N-VA, Nieuw-Vlaamse Alliantie), and several extra-parliamentary organisations, a number of which are represented in the Overlegcentrum van Vlaamse Verenigingen (OVV, Consultation Centre of Flemish Associations). The most important of these is the Vlaamse Volksbeweging (VVB, Flemish People's Movement).

In recent history, the Flemish Movement has increasingly grown amid the 2007–2011 Belgian political crisis and its aftermath. Since 2010, the separatist N-VA party has been the biggest polled in Flanders, while Vlaams Belang has become the second largest in the 2019 federal and regional elections.

== History ==
=== Early roots ===
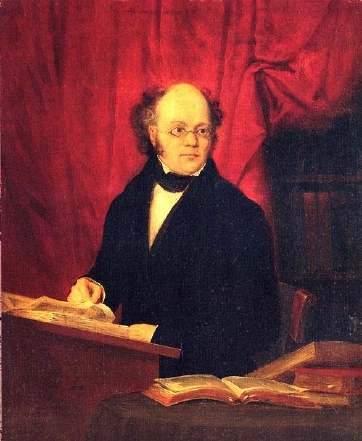
Jan Frans Willems

In the Spanish and then Austrian Netherlands in the 18th century and until the Brabant Revolution, the language of the literate was Spanish and then gradually French, but accompanied by a vernacular language. Language problems did not arise at that time.

In 1788 Jan Baptist Chrysostomus Verlooy (1747–1797), a jurist and politician from the Southern Netherlands, wrote an essay titled Verhandeling op d'Onacht der moederlycke tael in de Nederlanden (Essay on the disregard of the native language in the Low Countries). It is considered to be the first movement in favour of the Flemish language, but also in favour of freedom and democracy.

Before the creation of the Belgian state, the French language had already been for centuries a lingua franca for the bourgeoisie and noble elites among Europe (including the territories that would then become Belgium). With the French Revolution and Napoleon's conquests, today's Belgium was attached to France in 1795. France imposed its official language on the Belgian territory with the result of accelerating the conversion of the upper class from current Wallonia and Flanders to the French language.

At that time, most of the population however spoke Germanic languages and dialects in the north and south (Flemish, Brabantian, Limburgish and Luxembourgish) as well as Romance languages and dialects in the south of the territory (Walloon, Picard, Champenois and Lorrain) which were not standardized and unified languages. Those people often could not understand or speak any French.

=== Belgian Independence ===
After the fall of Napoleon, the Congress of Vienna of 1815 led to the creation of a buffer state: the United Kingdom of the Netherlands composed of today's Netherlands, Luxembourg and Belgium.

The United Kingdom of the Netherlands survived for a short period of 15 years; that was put to an end by the Belgian revolution. The revolution was due to a combination of factors, the main one being the difference of religion (Catholic in today's Belgium, Protestant in today's Netherlands). Other important factors also played a role in the independence. Among those factors, we can cite:

- The under-representation of Belgians in the parliament (62% of the population for 50% of the seats);
- The over-representation of Dutch people in the administration and important positions (4 times more);
- The fact that the public debt of the Netherlands (higher than that of the south) had to be supported by today's Belgium as well;
- The diminution in the freedom of the press and freedom of assembly.
- William I of the Netherlands imposed the standard Dutch everywhere in the Flemish-speaking part of Belgium, provoking the anger of the Flemish (albeit close to their language, Flemish people did not master at the time standard Dutch and were not considering this language as theirs) and of the French-speaking upper-class of today's Belgium. On 4 June 1830 (before the revolution) linguistic freedom was however restored.

A common grievance of the Flemish movement is that the Belgian revolution was a will of the French-speaking Belgians. They invoke that the volunteers were mainly Walloons and from the French-speaking bourgeoisie. This argument has also been invoked by Walloon nationalists in the past.

Two studies conducted by prof. John W. Rooney Jr. and prof. Jean Stengers however contradict those statements. These studies have shown that the vast majority of the revolutionaries originated from Brussels and from the province of Brabant and were of modest origin. According to John W. Rooney Jr., between 73% and 88% of the dead and injured were from Brussels and 91% and 95% were from Brabant. Jean Stengers reaches the same conclusion (76% of the fighters from Brussels). Prof. Els Witte comes to the same conclusion regarding the origin of the fighters. At the time, Brussels and the province of Brabant are mainly Brabantian-speaking (close to Flemish), which shows that Flemish speakers actively took part in the Belgian revolution. Rooney concludes that 60% of the workers who took part in the revolution were Flemish speakers. According to the same study, the upper class accounted for only 5% of revolutionaries.

A large part of the Francophone Belgian elites were in fact opposed to the revolution and wanted to remain within the United Kingdom of the Netherlands , considering that their interests would be better served there. This led to a movement called "Orangism" which spread among a substantial part of the French-speaking elites of Flanders, Brussels and Wallonia.

After the Belgian revolution, protests occurred in large Flemish cities, notably in Ghent, where the textile industry was deeply hurt by the new political situation. Those events are however not to be misplaced in time, as they occurred months after the actual revolution.

=== French Flanders ===
Upon Belgium becoming an independent state from the Netherlands, there was an (administrative) reaction against the Dutch and their language. In an attempt to remove Dutch from the new country, Belgian officials declared that the only official language in Belgium now was French. The Administration, Justice System, and higher education (apart from elementary schools in Flanders) all functioned in the French language. Even Brussels, the capital where more than 95% of the population spoke Dutch, lacked a formal, state-sanctioned Flemish school of higher education. The consequence was that every contact with the government and justice was conducted in French. This led to a number of erroneous legal judgements where innocent people received the death penalty because they were not able to verbally defend themselves at trials.

The French-speaking Belgian government succeeded in removing the Dutch language from all levels of government more quickly in Brussels than in any other part of Flanders. Because the administration was centered in Brussels, more and more French-speaking officials took up residency there. Education in Brussels was only in French which led to a surplus of young, unskilled and uneducated Flemish men. Dutch was hardly taught in the French schools. For example: Dutch was worth 10 points in French schools, but drawing earned 15 points. Today 16% of Brussels is Dutch-speaking, whereas in 1830 it was over 95%.

The French-speaking bourgeoisie showed little respect for the Flemish portion of the population. Belgium's co-founder, Charles Rogier, wrote in 1832 to Jean-Joseph Raikem, the minister of justice:

Les premiers principes d'une bonne administration sont basés sur l'emploi exclusif d'une langue, et il est évident que la seule langue des Belges doit être le français. Pour arriver à ce résultat, il est nécessaire que toutes les fonctions civiles et militaires soient confiées à des Wallons et à des Luxembourgeois; de cette manière, les Flamands, privés temporairement des avantages attachés à ces emplois, seront contraints d'apprendre le français, et l'on détruira ainsi peu à peu l'élément germanique en Belgique."

"The first principles of a good administration are based upon the exclusive use of one language, and it is evident that the only language of the Belgians should be French. In order to achieve this result, it is necessary that all civil and military functions are entrusted to Walloons and Luxemburgers; this way, the Flemish, temporarily deprived of the advantages of these offices, will be constrained to learn French, and we will hence destroy bit by bit the Germanic element in Belgium."

In 1838, another co-founder, senator Alexandre Gendebien, even declared that the Flemish were "one of the more inferior races on the Earth, just like the negroes".

The economic heart of Belgium in those days was Flanders. However, Wallonia would soon take the lead due to the Industrial Revolution. The Belgian establishment deemed it unnecessary to invest in Flanders and no less than 80% of the Belgian GNP between 1830 and 1918 went to Wallonia. This had as a consequence that Wallonia had a surplus of large coal mines and iron ore facilities, while Flanders, to a large extent, remained a rural, farming region. When Belgium became independent, the economy of Flanders was hard hit. Antwerp was now almost impossible to reach by ships (The Scheldt River was blocked by the Netherlands) and foreign trade was drastically affected. The prosperous textile industry of Ghent lost a major portion of its market to Amsterdam.

=== A call for change ===
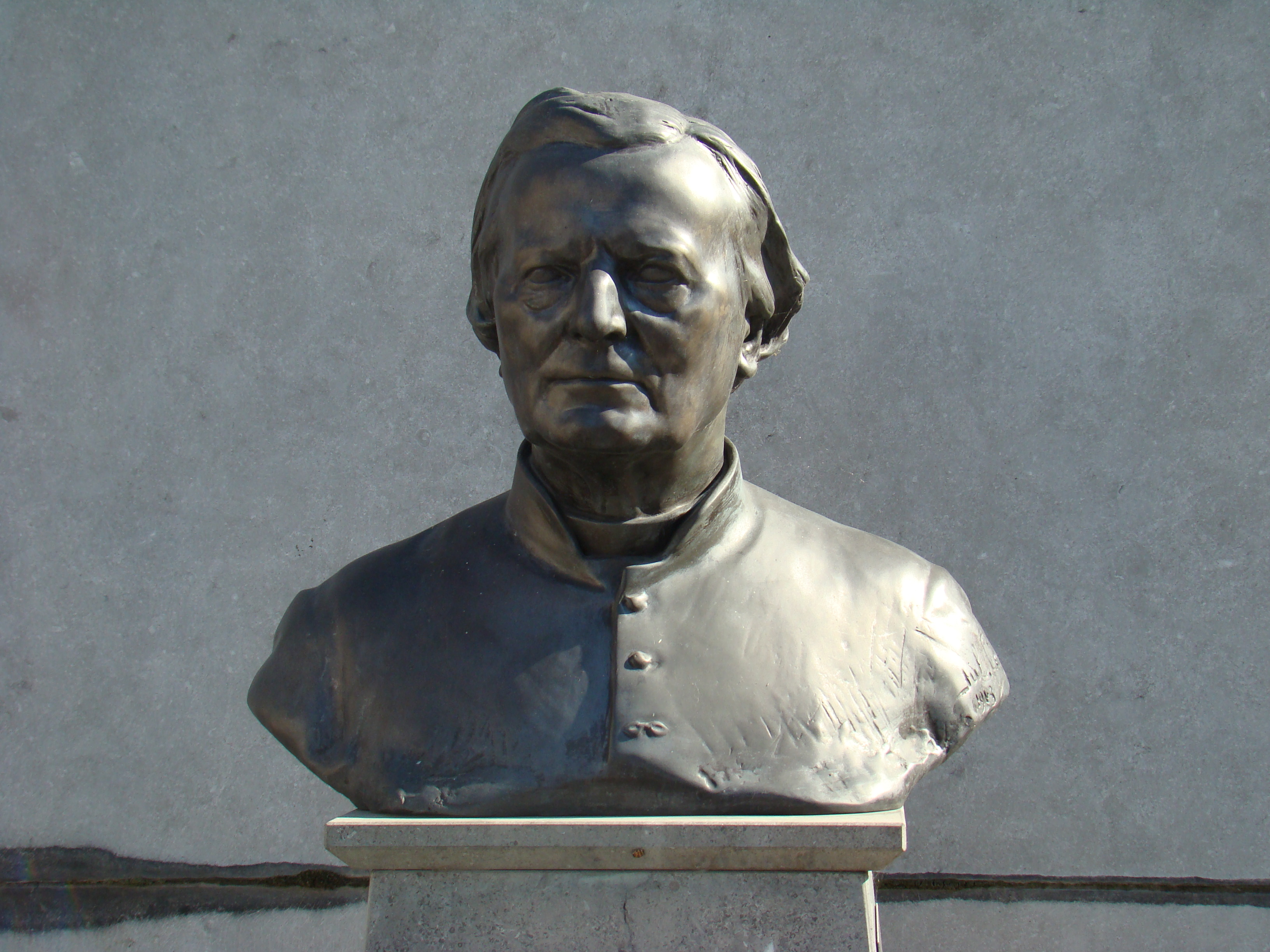
Bust of Hugo Verriest in Roeselare, Belgium.

It was decades after the Belgian revolution that Flemish intellectuals, such as Jan Frans Willems, Philip Blommaert, Karel Lodewijk Ledeganck, Ferdinand Augustijn Snellaert, August Snieders, Prudens van Duyse, and Hendrik Conscience, began to call for recognition of the Dutch language and Flemish culture in Belgium. This movement became known as the Flemish Movement, but was more intellectual than social, with contributors such as the poets Guido Gezelle, Hugo Verriest, and Albrecht Rodenbach (all of whom were associated with the Minor Seminary, Roeselare).

Cultural organizations promoting the Dutch language and Flemish culture were founded, such as the Willemsfonds in 1851, and the Davidsfonds in 1875. The first Vlaemsch Verbond (Constant Leirens, Ghent) and the Nederduitse Bond, were founded in 1861. The Liberale Vlaemsche Bond was founded in 1867. Writers such as Julius de Geyter and Max Rooses were active in the Nederduitse Bond. On 26 September 1866, Julius de Geyter founded the Vlaamsche Bond in Antwerp. The Flemish weekly magazine Het Volksbelang, founded by Julius Vuylsteke, appeared for the first time on 12 January 1867.

In 1861, the first Flemish political party, the Meetingpartij was founded in Antwerp, by radical liberals, Catholics and Flamingants (Jan Theodoor van Rijswijck, J. De Laet and E. Coremans), and it existed until 1914. In 1888, Julius Hoste Sr. founded the moderate liberal Flemish newspaper Het Laatste Nieuws, to support the Flemish Movement in Brussels. In 1893, the Flemish priest Adolf Daens, founded the Christene Volkspartij, which would cause a radicalization and democratization of the Catholic party. The first Flemish political success was the passing of the Gelijkheidswet (Equality law) in 1898 that for the first time recognized Dutch as equal to French in judicial matters (legal documents).

=== World War I ===
The liberal politician Louis Franck, the Roman Catholic Frans Van Cauwelaert and the socialist Camille Huysmans (together they were called the three crowing cocks) worked together for the introduction of Dutch at Ghent University. In 1911 the proposal by Lodewijk De Raet to this end was accepted, though it would not be implemented until 1930. With the coming of the 20th century the Flemish Movement became more radical and during World War I some activists welcomed the occupiers as "liberating Germanic brothers". The young Marnix Gijsen and the poet Paul van Ostaijen were involved in this activist movement during the war. The Germans did indeed help out their "Germanic brothers" by setting Dutch as the sole administrative language and by creating the Dutch language Von Bissing University in Ghent. Such steps were dictated by the German tactics of taking advantage of the Flemish-Walloon animosity in order to further Germany's own aims and to boost the occupying power's position known as the Flamenpolitik. With German support, Flemish activists formed a regional government, known as the Raad van Vlaanderen (RVV) which declared Flemish autonomy in December 1917. During World War I several Flemish soldiers were punished for their active or passive involvement in the Flemish Movement. Ten of these soldiers were sent to a penal military unit in 1918 called the Special Forestry Platoon in Orne, Normandy, France. They were forced to work as woodchoppers in hard living conditions until several months after the war ended. Most of the Flemish population disapproved of those who collaborated with the German occupiers. The language reforms implemented by the Germans during occupation did not remain in place after the defeat of Germany. The collaboration and subsequent prosecution of certain leaders of the Flemish Movement did not produce a climate congenial to compromise.

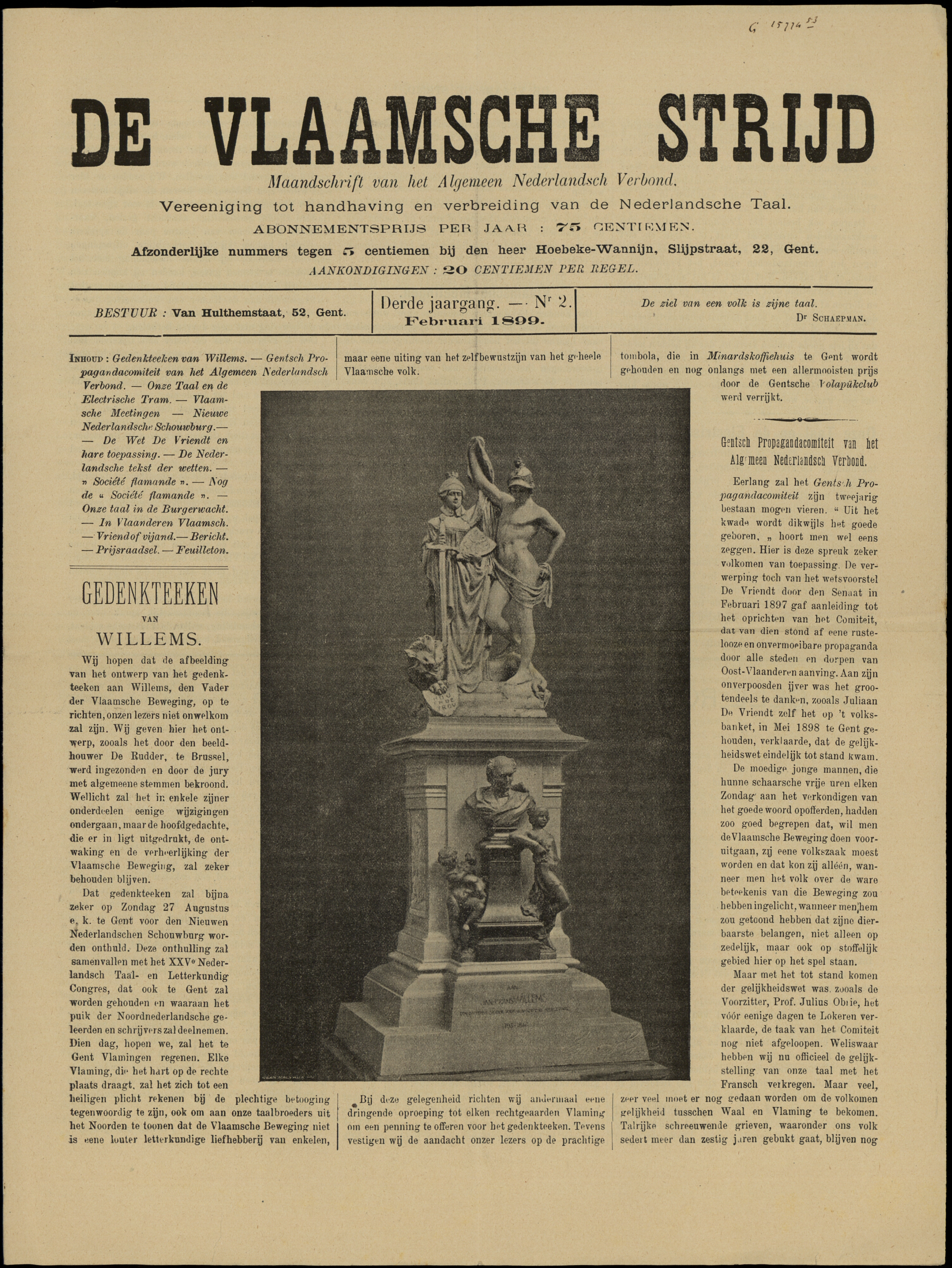
Excerpt from the newspaper De Vlaamsche Strijd of 1899. Preserverd in the Ghent University Library. Good example of the propaganda that was held.

=== Post World War I ===
The Flemish Movement became more socially oriented through the Frontbeweging (Front Movement), an organization of Flemish soldiers who complained about the lack of consideration for their language in the army, and in Belgium in general, and harbored pacifistic feelings. The Frontbeweging became a political movement, dedicated to peace, tolerance and autonomy (Nooit Meer Oorlog, Godsvrede, Zelfbestuur). A yearly pilgrimage to the IJzertoren is still held to this day. The poet Anton van Wilderode wrote multiple texts for this occasion. A number of rumours arose regarding the treatment of Flemish soldiers in World War I, though Flemish historians debunked a number of these. One such rumour is that multiple Dutch-speaking soldiers were slaughtered because they could not understand orders given to them in French by French speaking officers. Whether a disproportionate number of Flemish died in the war compared to Walloons remains a point of contention to this day. It is clear, however, that the Belgian army de facto had only French as the official language. The phrase "et pour les Flamands, la meme chose" originated in this environment also, allegedly being used by the French-speaking officers to "translate" their orders into Dutch. It literally means "and for the Flemish, the same thing", which adds insult to injury for Flemish soldiers not understanding French. Another source of further frustration was the Belgian royal family's poor knowledge of Dutch. King Albert I enjoyed some popularity in the early ages of the war because he was a proponent of the bilingual status of Flanders – even though Wallonia was monolingual French, because he declared his oath to be king in both French and Dutch, and because he gave a speech at the start of the war in Dutch, referring to the Battle of the Golden Spurs. In the last years of the war, however, it became clear that his only wish was to keep his country peaceful, and not to give the Flemish the rights the French-speaking establishment denied them.

In the 1920s the first Flemish nationalist party was elected. In the 1930s the Flemish Movement grew ever larger and Dutch was recognized for the first time as the sole language of Flanders. In 1931, Joris Van Severen founded the Verbond van Dietse Nationaal-Solidaristen Verdinaso, a fascist movement in Flanders.

=== World War II ===
During World War II, Belgium was once again occupied by Germany. The Third Reich enacted laws to protect and encourage the Dutch language in Belgium and, generally, to propagate ill-feelings between Flemings and Francophones, e.g. by setting free only Flemish prisoners-of-war (see Flamenpolitik). The Nazis had no intentions of allowing the creation of an independent Flemish state or of a Greater Netherlands, and instead desired the complete annexation of not only Flanders (which they did de jure during the war through the establishment of a "Reichsgau Flandern" in late 1944), but all of the Low Countries as "racially Germanic" components of a Greater Germanic Reich. Most Flemish nationalists embraced collaboration as a means to more autonomy. Because of this collaboration by a few, after the war being part of the Flemish movement was associated with having collaborated with the enemy.

=== Post World War II ===
While the Vermeylenfonds had been founded in 1945, the Flemish Movement lay dormant for nearly 20 years following the Second World War. In the 1960s the Flemish movement once more gathered momentum and, in 1962, the linguistic borders within Belgium were finally drawn up with Brussels being designated as a bilingual city. Also, in 1967 an official Dutch version of the Belgian Constitution was adopted. For more than 130 years, the Dutch version of the Belgian constitution had been only a translation without legal value. The late 1960s saw all major Belgian political parties splitting up into either Flemish or Francophone wings. It also saw the emergence of the first major nationalist Flemish party, the Volksunie (Popular Union). In 1977 more radical far right-wing factions of the Volksunie became united and, together with earlier far right nationalist groups, formed Vlaams Blok. This party eventually overtook the Volksunie, only to be forced later, on the grounds of a discrimination conviction, to change its name to Vlaams Belang. It has become an important right-wing party of the Flemish Movement.

=== Language border ===
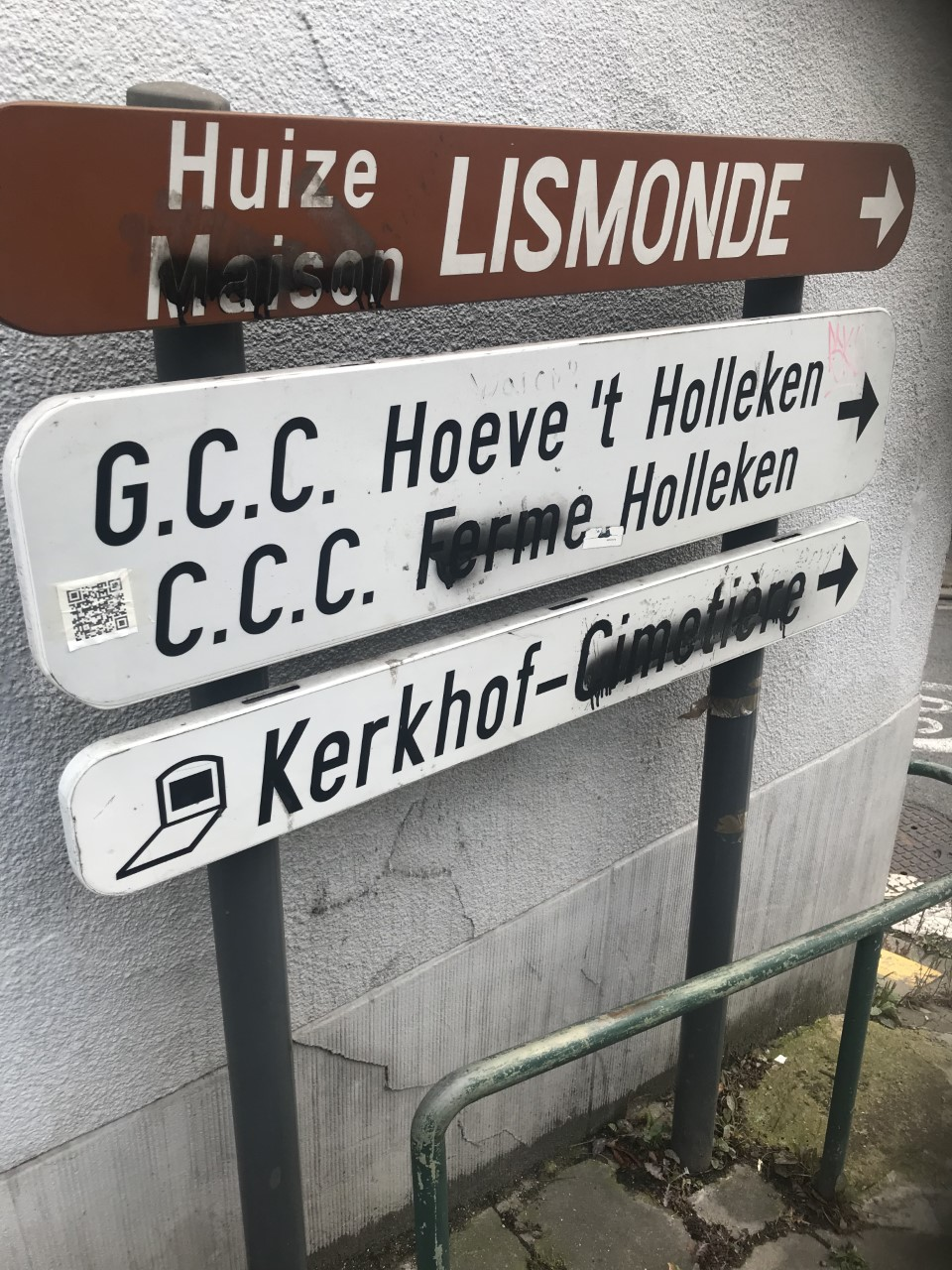
Bilingual road sign in Linkebeek. The French words have been painted over, leaving the Dutch words only.

During the existence of Belgium more and more Dutch-speaking regions have become French-speaking regions; for example, Mouscron (Moeskroen), Comines (Komen), and particularly Brussels (see Francization of Brussels). Every ten years the government counted the people who spoke Dutch and those who spoke French. These countings always favoured the French-speaking part of Belgium. In 1962 the Linguistic Border was drawn. In order to do so, a complicated compromise with the French-speakers was orchestrated: Brussels had to be recognised as an autonomous and bilingual region while Flanders and Wallonia remained monolingual regions. The French-speakers also demanded that in certain regions where there was a minority of more than 30% French-speaking or Dutch-speaking people; there would be language facilities. This means that these people can communicate with the government in their birth language.

=== Present day ===
The Flemish saw these facilities as a measure of integration to another language, as opposed to viewing it as a recognition of a permanent linguistic minority. The French-speaking people, however, saw these language facilities as an acquired right, and a step for an eventual addition to the bilingual region of Brussels, even though that would be unconstitutional. As a result, the number of French-speaking people in these regions (mostly around Brussels) did not decline, and contain a growing majority of French-speaking Belgians, even though they reside in the officially monolingual Flanders. Francization is considered frustrating by the Flemish Movement and a reason for a call to separate.

The situation is intensified due to a lack of Dutch language classes in the French-speaking schools.

=== Transfers ===
Since the 1960s and continuing into the present time, Flanders is significantly richer than Wallonia. Based on population and GDP figures for 2007, GDP per capita in that year was €28,286 (US$38,186) in Flanders and €20,191 (US$27,258) in Wallonia. Although equalization payments between richer and poorer regions are common in federal states, the amount, the visibility and the utilization of these financial transfers are a singularly important issue for the Flemish Movement. A study by the University of Leuven has estimated the size of the annual transfers from Flanders to Wallonia and Brussels in 2007 at 5.7 billion euros. If the effect of interest payments on the national debt is taken into account the figure could be as high as 11.3 billion euros or more than 6% of Flemish GDP. Flemish criticism is not limited to the size of the transfers but also extends to the lack of transparency and the presumed inability or unwillingness of the recipients to use the money wisely and thus close the economic gap with Flanders. Although no longer relevant in the current economic context, the discussion is often exacerbated by the historic fact that even in the 19th century, when Flanders was much the poorer region, there was a net transfer from Flanders to Wallonia; this was mainly because of relatively heavier taxation of agriculture than of industrial activity. The tax system was never adjusted to reflect the industrial affluence of Wallonia, which led to an imbalance in tax revenue placing Flanders (average for 1832–1912 period: 44% of the population, 44% of total taxes) at a disadvantage compared with Wallonia (38% of population, 30% of taxes).

=== Current Belgian politics ===
As a result of escalating internal conflicts the Volksunie ceased to exist in 2000, splitting into two new parties: Spirit and N-VA (Nieuwe Vlaamse Alliantie, New Flemish Alliance). Both parties tried their luck in cartel with a bigger party, N-VA allying with the Christian Democrats of CD&V, and Spirit with the Flemish socialists of SP.a. The cartel CD&V – N-VA emerged as the clear winner of the Belgian general election in June 2007 on a platform promising a far-reaching reform of the state. However, coalition negotiations with the French-speaking parties, who rejected any reform, proved extremely difficult. When the CD&V leader Yves Leterme was eventually able to form a government, his reform plans had been greatly diluted and with the onset of the financial crisis in the autumn of 2008 they were shelved completely. This led N-VA to break up the cartel in September 2008, withdrawing its parliamentary support for the federal government (which was thus left without a parliamentary majority in Flanders, a situation that is not unconstitutional but has been deemed undesirable by politicians and constitutional experts).

The role of Spirit, which represented the more left-leaning part of the former Volksunie, gradually declined. After a series of defections, two unsuccessful attempts to broaden its appeal (each time accompanied by a name change) and ending far below the 5% threshold in the Flemish regional elections of 2009, what was left of the party merged with Groen! (the Flemish green party) at the end of 2009.

In the Belgian general election of June 2010, N-VA became the leading party in Flanders and even in Belgium as a whole, polling 28% of the Flemish vote, dwarfing the senior partner of their former cartel, CD&V, which ended at an all-time low of 17.5%. The enormous growth of N-VA is generally explained as caused by an influx of "moderate" Flemish voters who do not support the party's eventual aim of Flemish independence but do want consistent and far-reaching reforms with greater autonomy for the regions, something they no longer trust the traditional parties to be able to achieve. On the Walloon side, the Parti Socialiste (PS), led by Elio Di Rupo, received an even stronger electoral mandate with 37% of the vote. After the election, coalition negotiations started with seven parties: N-VA, CD&V, SP.a and Groen! on the Flemish side, and PS, CDH (nominally Christian Democrat but very much left of centre) and the green party Ecolo on the Francophone side. The talks soon ran into serious difficulties, mainly because of the totally opposed objectives of the two victors: the N-VA economically conservative but with a radical constitutional agenda, the PS socialist and reluctant to agree to any significant reform of the state. The ensuing deadlock led to an 18-month government formation crisis. In the end, a coalition was formed by CD&V, SP.a, Open VLD on the Flemish side, and PS, CDH and MR on the Walloon side. This coalition however didn't contain a majority of the Flemish representatives, with only 43 of 88 Flemish seats supporting it. This situation had never happened since the split of the political parties into Flemish and Walloon wings. The following 2014 election saw large electoral gains for N-VA, mostly at the expense of VB.

== Modern internal trends ==
=== Separatists ===
The militant wing of the Flemish Movement, such as the Vlaams Belang, advocates the foundation of an independent Flemish republic, separating from Wallonia. A part of this militant wing also advocates reunion with the Netherlands. This view is shared with several Dutch right-wing activists and nationalists, as well as some mainstream politicians both in the Netherlands and Flanders (such as Louis Tobback, the former mayor of Leuven and former minister of defence and Eurocommissioner Frits Bolkestein).

The N-VA takes a gradualist approach looking to transfer powers to Flanders and the EU working towards the final goal of an independent Flanders as a European Member State.

=== Confederalists ===
The liberal List Dedecker, as well as several representatives of important Flemish parties belonging to the moderate wing, including the Christian Democratic and Flemish (CD&V) party, the Flemish Liberals and Democrats (VLD) party, and, to a lesser extent, the Different Socialist Party (SP.A), prefer a confederal organisation of the Belgian state over the current federal organisation. Such a scheme would make the Flemish government responsible for nearly all aspects of government, whereas some important aspects of government are currently the responsibility of the Belgian federal government. The Belgian capital of Brussels would remain a city where both Dutch-speaking and French-speaking citizens share equal rights.

As of 2010, the confederalist parties made up more than half of the Flemish Parliament, which combined with the separatist parties, would result in about 80% of the Flemish Parliament (and at least this much of the Flemish part of the Belgian Federal Parliament) occupied by parties who wish to see Flanders obtaining greater autonomy than is the case today.

=== Federalists ===
Several representatives of the SP.A and, to a lesser extent, the CD&V and VLD parties, prefer an improved federal organisation of the Belgian state over a confederal one. This view is shared with several social and cultural organisations such as the Vermeylenfonds (Vermeylen Foundation) or Willemsfonds, with labor unions, and with mutual health insurance organisations. The advocates of this view hope to improve the Belgian institutions so that they work correctly.

== Opinion polling ==
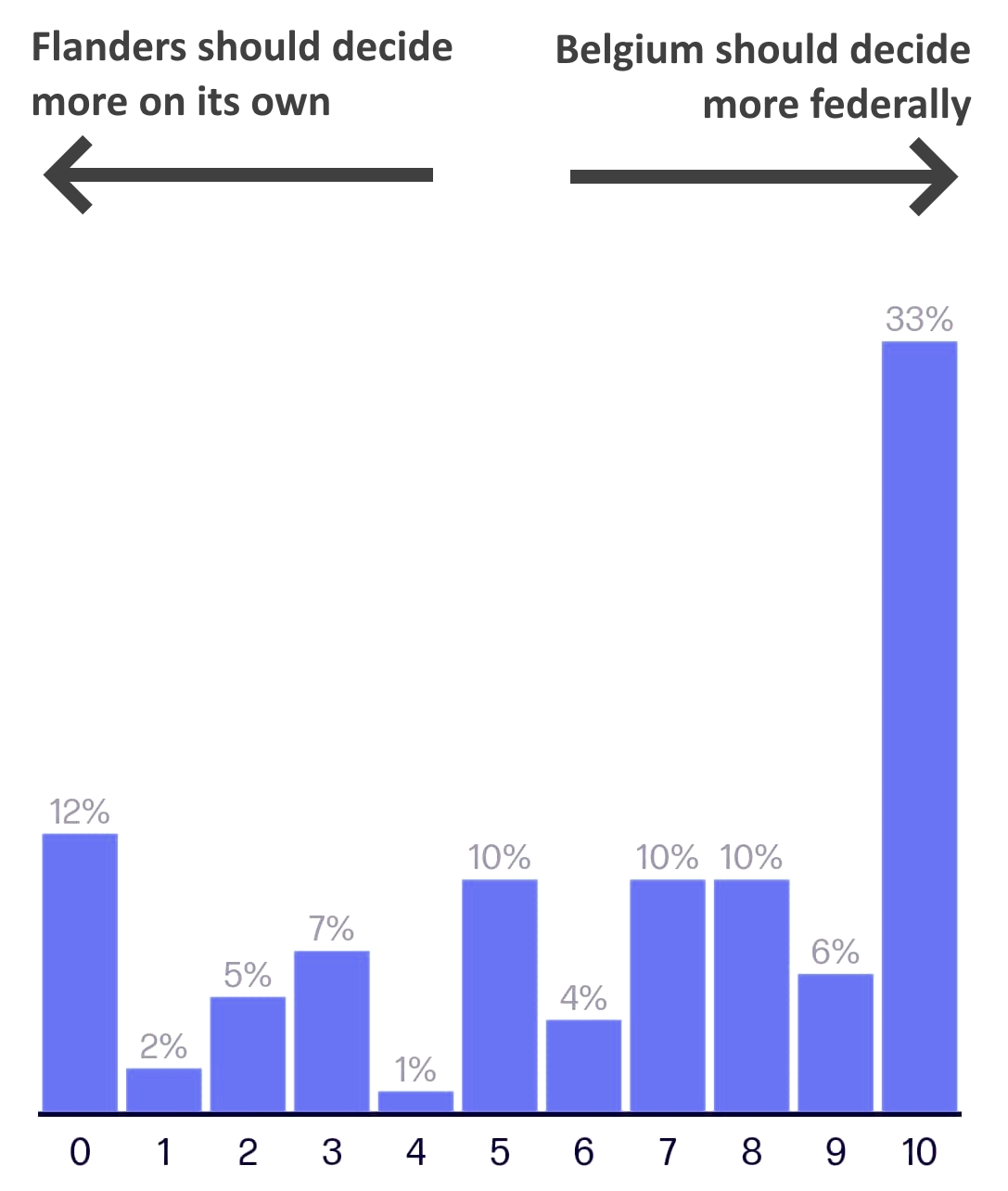
Visual representation of a May 2021 poll commissioned from De Stemming

In June 2006 a poll published by VRT found that 40% percent of respondents support Flemish independence.

In December 2019 a poll published by Le Soir and RTL found that 37% percent of Flemish respondents would vote for Flemish independence, as opposed to only 14% percent of Walloons and 17% percent of Brussels residents.

In May 2021, an article by VRT showed a poll taken by De Stemming (Note: A research commissioned by VRT NWS and De Standaard, conducted by the University of Antwerp and KU Leuven.) gauging preferences in how the country is run (depicted). The research ran from late March to 19 April. Correspondents could choose between a grade ranging from 0 to 10, with 0 tending towards 'more Flanders' and 10 referring to 'more Belgium'. The study found that 63% wanted 'more Belgium' and only 27% 'more Flanders', with 10% indicating the status quo is fine.

== See also ==
- Burgundian Netherlands
- Dietsland
- Flemish literature
- French Flemish
- Partition of Belgium
- Politics of Flanders
- Seventeen Provinces
- Walloon movement
- List of active separatist movements in Europe
