= Rodenbachfonds =

Flemish nonprofit foundation

The Rodenbachfonds, named after Albrecht Rodenbach, is a Flemish non-profit and cultural foundation or "cultuurfonds" related to the Flemish movement. It is one of a family of five cultural foundations in Flanders, together with the Davidsfonds, Vermeylenfonds, Willemsfonds, and Masereelfonds.

The Rodenbachfonds was founded in 1984. It strives for social cohesion and solidarity in society, taking Dutch language and Flemish culture as a starting point. It accentuates an open perception and experience of Flemish identity. With its activities, the Rodenbachfonds wants to strengthen the role of the neighborhood or village as a prime location to facilitate community participation, cooperation between generations and cultural exchange. The Chairperson of the organization is, since 2011, Patrik Vankrunkelsven.

== See also ==
- Masereelfonds
- Vermeylenfonds
- Davidsfonds
- Willemsfonds
