= Frans de Potter =

Belgian writer

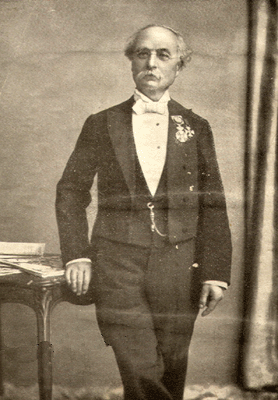
Frans De Potter

Frans de Potter (4 January 1834, Ghent – 15 August 1904) was a Belgian writer in the Dutch language.

He was Chief Clerk of the Fondsenblad of Ghent, and from 1886 onwards secretary of the Flemish Academy. He wrote an extensive oeuvre, such as Geschiedenis der Nederlandse Letterkunde, (1854), Volksliederen, (1861, a cantata Jacob van Artevelde, (1863), Geschiedwerk over Gent en Kortrijk, Geschiedenis van Jacoba van Beieren, (1880).

Of particular importance is his Vlaamsche bibliographie of 1893, and his Geschiedenis van de gemeenten van Oost-Vlaanderen, (46 volumes). He was awarded for his Gemeentefeesten in Vlaanderen in 1870. He also wrote an historical novel Robert van Valois te Gent (1862).

Frans de Potter was the main founder of the Roman Catholic Davidsfonds and became its first general secretary, and in 1886 he created the Flemish Academy in Ghent as an addition to the Royal Academy in Brussels.

== Bibliography ==
- Spelling der aardrijkskundige namen. In: Het Belfort: volume 1 (1886)
- Een hoekje der stad Gent. In: Het Belfort: volume 1 (1886)

== See also ==
- Flemish literature

== Sources ==
- Frans de Potter
- K. ter Laan, Letterkundig woordenboek voor Noord en Zuid (1941)
