= Masereelfonds =

Progressive Flemish non-profit cultural organization

The Masereelfonds, named after Frans Masereel, is a Flemish non-profit cultural organization, for the promotion and support of the Dutch language in Flanders (northern Belgium). It is one of a family of five cultural organizations in Flanders, such as the Davidsfonds, Vermeylenfonds, Willemsfonds, and the Rodenbachfonds. Traditionally it was related to the Belgian communist party, but nowadays it is a progressive cultural organization.

== See also ==
- Flemish literature
