= Georges Rodenbach =

Belgian Symbolist poet and novelist (1855–1898)

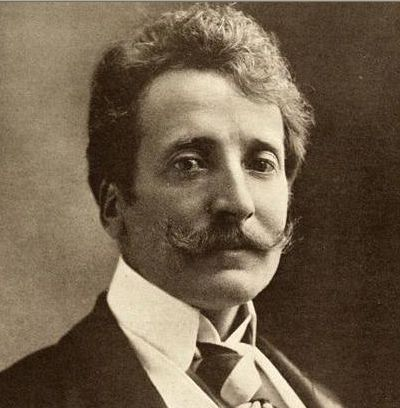
- Born: Georges Raymond Constantin Rodenbach; 16 July 1855; Tournai, Belgium
- Died: 25 December 1898 (aged 43); Paris, France
- Resting place: Père Lachaise cemetery, Paris
- Occupations: Novelist, poet
- Relatives: Albrecht Rodenbach (cousin)

Georges Raymond Constantin Rodenbach (16 July 1855 – 25 December 1898) was a Belgian Symbolist poet and novelist.

== Biography ==
Georges Rodenbach was born in Tournai to a French mother and a German father from the Rhineland (Andernach). He was related to the famous German poet Christoph Martin Wieland. He went to school in Ghent at the prestigious Sint-Barbaracollege, where he became friends with the poet Émile Verhaeren. Rodenbach worked as a lawyer and journalist. He was an early contributor to the literary review La Jeune Belgique, and spent the last ten years of his life in Paris as the correspondent of the Journal de Bruxelles, and was an intimate of Edmond de Goncourt.

He published eight collections of verse and four novels, as well as short stories, stage works and criticism. He produced some Parisian and purely imitative work; but a major part of his production is the outcome of a passionate idealisation of the quiet Flemish towns in which he had passed his childhood and early youth. In his best known work, Bruges-la-Morte (1892), he explains that his aim is to evoke the town as a living being, associated with the moods of the spirit, counselling, dissuading from and prompting action. Bruges-la-Morte was used by the composer Erich Wolfgang Korngold as the basis for his opera Die tote Stadt. Albrecht Rodenbach, his cousin, was a poet and novelist as well, and a leader in the revival of Flemish literature of the 19th century.

== Works ==
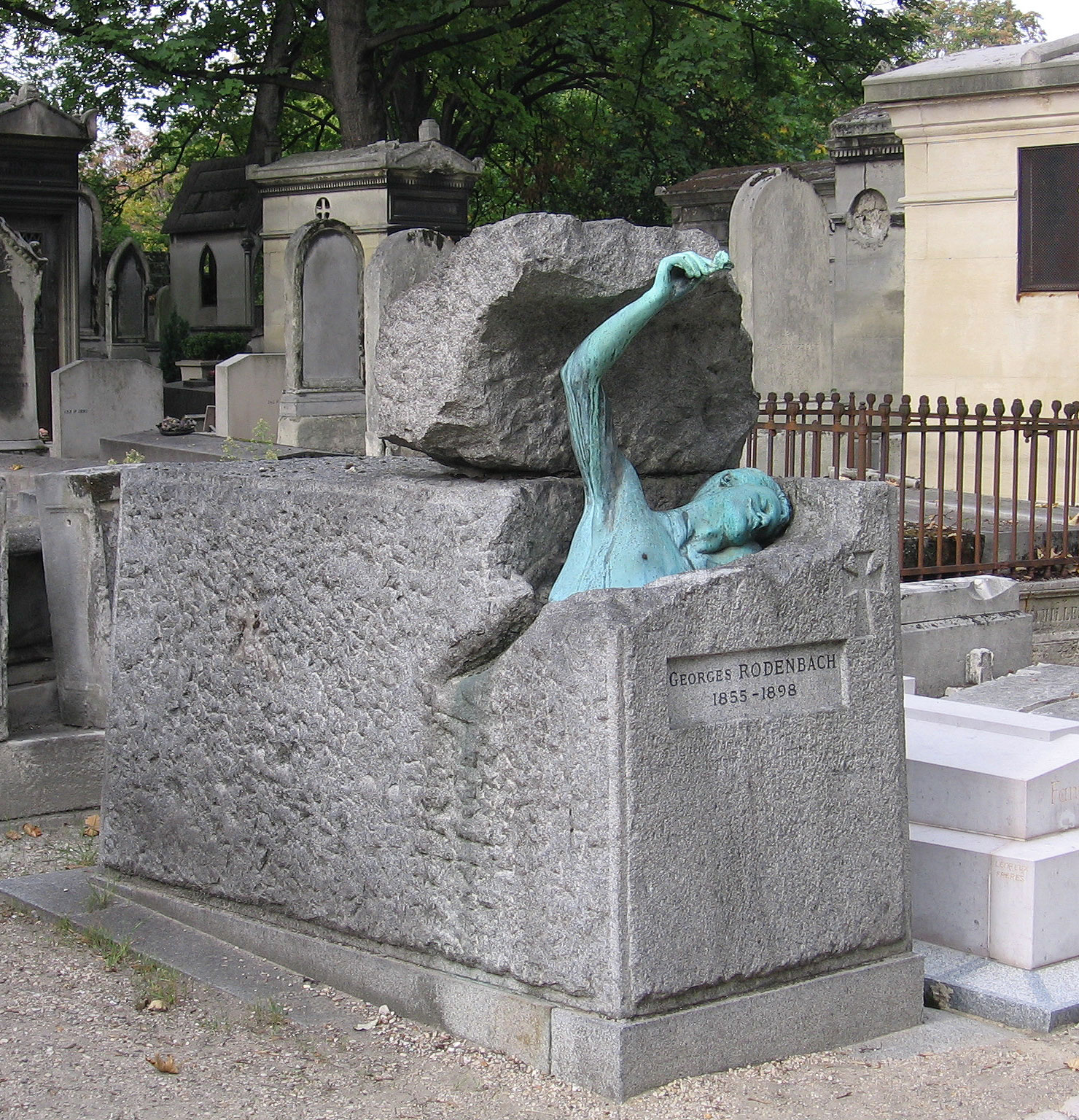
Rodenbach's tomb in Paris.

- Le Foyer et les Champs (1877), poetry
- Les Tristesses (1879), poetry
- La Belgique 1830-1880 (1880), historic poem
- La Mer élégante (1881), poetry
- L'Hiver mondain (1884)
- Vers d'amour (1884)
- La Jeunesse blanche (1886), poetry
- Du Silence (1888)
- L'Art en exil (1889)
- Bruges-la-Morte (1892)
- Le Voyage dans les yeux (1893)
- Le Voile, drama
- L'Agonie du soleil (1894)
- Musée de béguines (1894)
- Le Tombeau de Baudelaire (1894)
- La Vocation (1895), translated as Hans Cadzand's Vocation
- A propos de "Manette Salomon". L'Œuvre des Goncourt (1896)
- Les Tombeaux (1896)
- Les Vierges (1896)
- Les Vies encloses (1896), poem
- Le Carillonneur (1897), translated as The Bells of Bruges
- Agonies de villes (1897)
- Le Miroir du ciel natal (1898)
- Le Mirage (1900)
