= Ferdinand Augustijn Snellaert =

Flemish writer

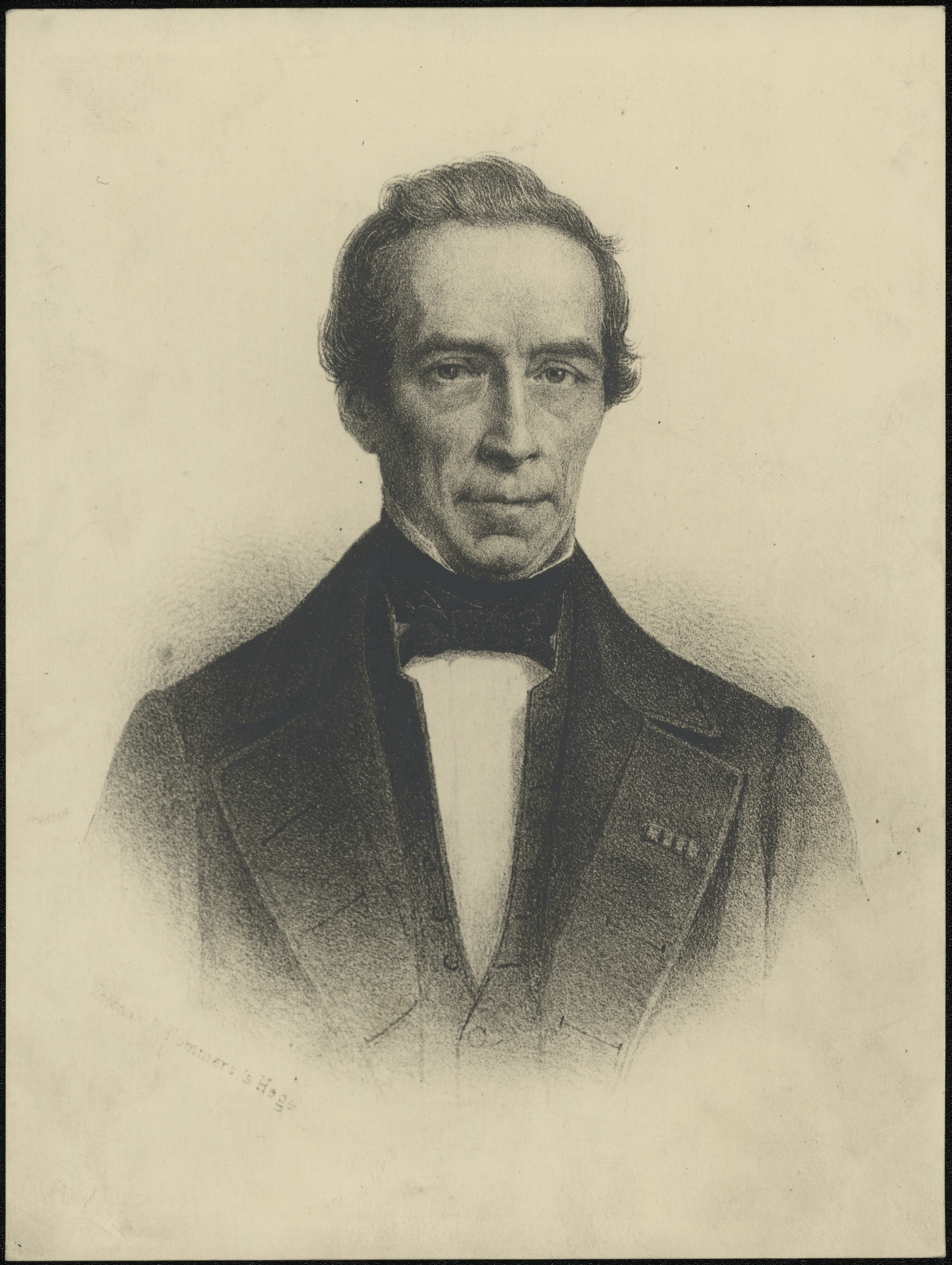
Ferdinand Snellart

Ferdinand Augustijn Snellaert (21 July 1809 in Kortrijk – 3 July 1872 in Ghent) was a Flemish writer.

== Life ==
Snellaert studied medicine at the University of Utrecht (1827–1829) and became officer of health in the Dutch army (1830–1835). After his dismissal, he graduated as a doctor from the University of Ghent (1836–1837), and became a general practitioner in Ghent.

Snellaert became active in the Flemish movement. He founded the Maetschappy van Vlaemsche Letteroefening De Tael is gantsch het Volk, and he participated in several Flemish actions, such as the Vlaams petitionnement (1840), the Kunst- en Letterblad (1840), the Dutch Linguistic and Literary Conferences(vanaf 1849), the Rapport van de Grievencommissie (1856–1859) en the Vlaemsch Verbond (1861).

In 1847, he succeeded his friend Jan Frans Willems as member of the Royal Belgian Academy in Brussels, where he represented the Flemish cause, and he was one of the co-founders of the Willemsfonds. In 1849, at the first Dutch Linguistic and Literary Conference, he held the opening speech, where he argued every possible means should be used to strengthen the spirit of the people, and that we should fight those who worked against the development of the spirit of the people. Language was believed to be an important tool to influence the character of the people.

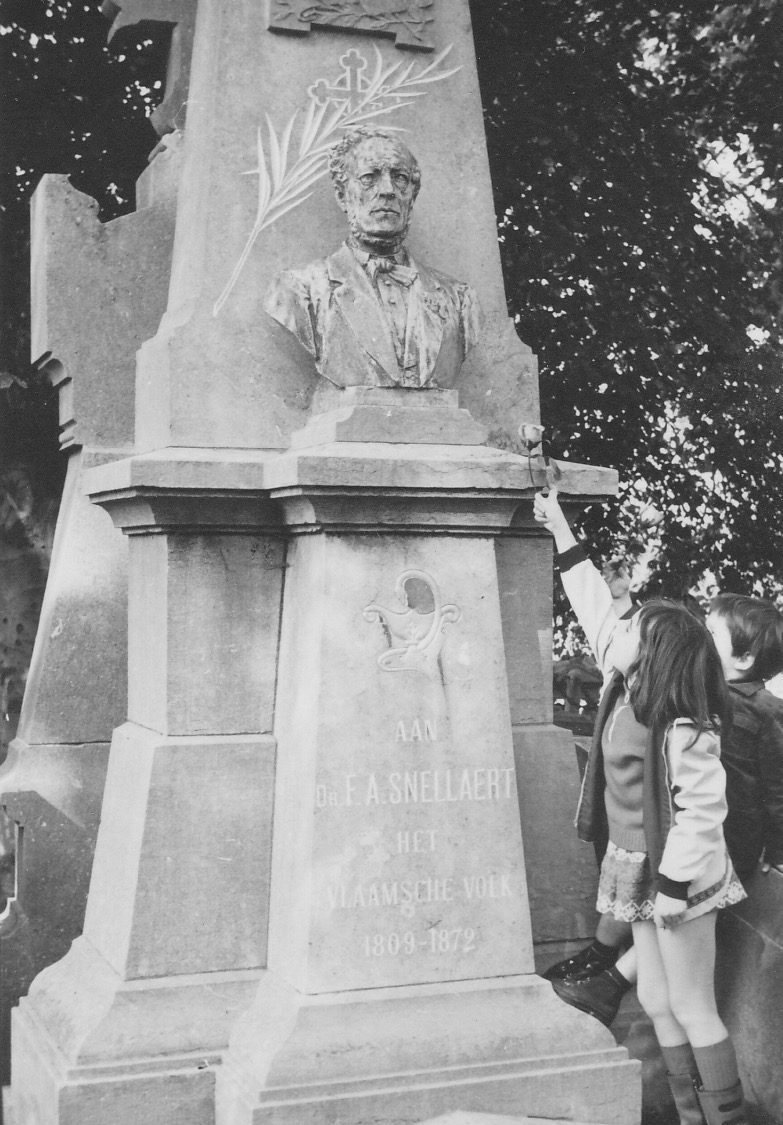
Grave monument

In the first half of the 1850s Snellaert tried to win a seat on the city council with the support of the moderate Société l'Union and the progressives of the newspaper Broedermin. However, due to the electoral victory of Judocus Delehaye he chose to join the Liberale Associatie ('Liberal Association'), where he was for a brief period a key figure of the pro-Flemish group. However, he failed to break through. His followers, including Jacob Heremans and especially Julius Vuylsteke turned away from him when it became clear that Snellaert, disappointed by the attitude of the Liberale Associatie, started to think again of establishing an ideologically neutral Flemish party. Despite mediation by Adolphe Pierre Sunaert, Snellaert broke in October 1860 with the Liberale Associatie, which led to a rift between the Ghent liberals and the liberal, pro-Flemish Snellaert. A similar conflict arose in 1861 in the Vlaemsch Verbond ("Flemish Union') of which Snellaert was a co-founder. The liberal group made it impossible to maintain this politically neutral Flemish association and would establish in 1866 the Vlaamsche Liberale Vereeniging ('Flemish Liberal Association').

== Honours ==
- 1849 : Knight in the Order of Leopold.

== Bibliography ==
- Oude Vlaemsche liederen (1848), together with Jan Frans Willems
- Histoire de la littérature flamande (1849)
- Vlaemsche bibliographie (1851)
- Oude en nieuwe liedjes (1852)
- Vlaemsche commissie (1859)
- Alexanders geesten (1861)
- Nederlandsche gedichten uit de veertiende eeuw van Jan van Boendaele, Hein van Aken e.a. (1869).

== Sources ==
- The Volksgeist Concept in Dutch Linguistics
- Ferdinand Augustijn Snellaert
