= Albrecht Rodenbach =

Flemish poet (1856–1880)

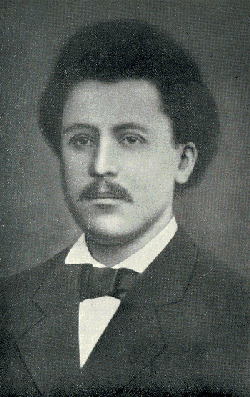
- Born: Albertus Petrus Josephus Mansuetus Ferdinandus Rodenbach; 27 October 1856; Roeselare, Belgium
- Died: 23 June 1880 (aged 23); Roeselare, Belgium
- Occupation: Poet
- Relatives: Georges Rodenbach (cousin)
- Writing career
- Literary movement: Flemish movement

Albertus Petrus Josephus Mansuetus Ferdinandus "Albrecht" Rodenbach (Dutch: [ˈɑlbrɛxt ˈroːdə(m)bɑx]; 27 October 1856 – 23 June 1880) was a Flemish poet, and a leader in the revival of Flemish literature, or "Flemish movement", that occurred in the late 19th century. He is more noteworthy as a symbol of the Flemish movement than for his actual activities, since he died at the age of 23. Hugo Verriest called Rodenbach "the poet, the soul, the heart, the mind, the word of Reborn Flanders".

== Early life ==
Rodenbach was born in Roeselare into a bourgeois family, the eldest of 10 children and cousin to the novelist Georges Rodenbach. Albrecht Rodenbach's father was Julius Rodenbach (1824–1915) from the Rhineland, brother to Felix Rodenbach, the Flemish political propagandist. Albrecht Rodenbach's mother was Silvia de la Houttre (1834–1899). Although his mother was a Walloon from Tournai, she had adopted the Dutch spoken in Roeselare. From an early age, Rodenbach was exposed to Flemish nationalistic feeling by his father and his uncle.

Rodenbach attended the Minor Seminary, Roeselare, where he was exposed to the ideas of the Flemish literature movement by Hugo Verriest and others. Rodenbach was also influenced at this time by Guido Gezelle. In the 1874–1875 school year, this led to a conflict between the Flemish students and the school's francophile director. At the annual songfest the students traditionally sang French songs, Rodenbach led the protest and the predominantly Dutch-speaking students sang a protest song in Dutch. This protest led to similar protests all over Belgium. Despite this and other activism, Rodenbach graduated with a first in rhetoric in 1876.

== Flemish movement ==
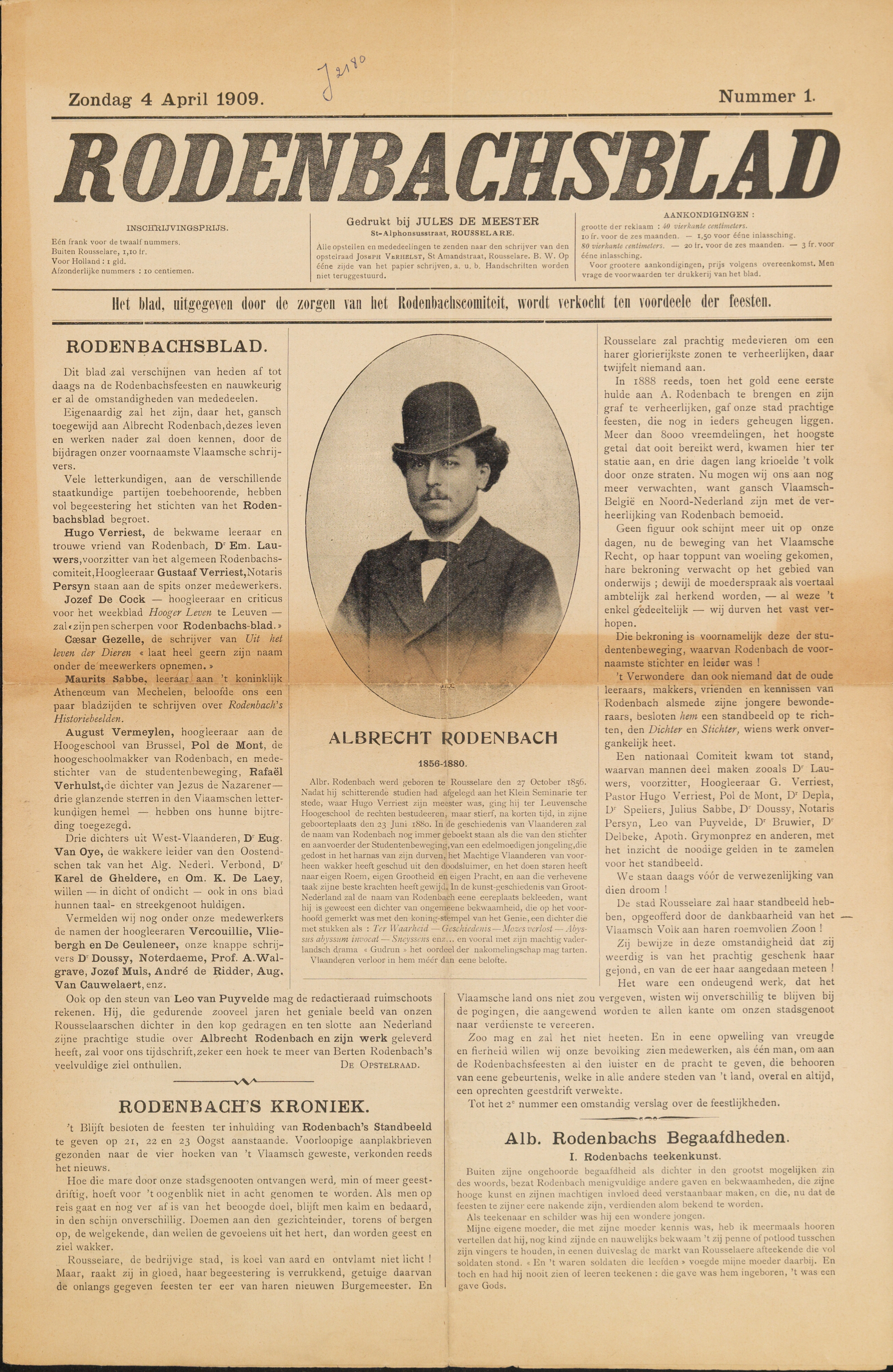
Excerpt from The Rodenbachsblad in 1909. A newspaper dedicated to Albrecht Rodenbach. Preserved in the Ghent University Library.

At the University of Leuven he met the poet Pol De Mont who was a year older. Together they sought to promote a Flemish artistic revival and equal rights for Flemish students as a student movement, creating the "Algemene Vlaamse Studentenbond" (All Flemish Student Association) in 1876. Among their objectives were to have classes in Dutch and to have classes include Flemish culture. The association's illustrated magazine Het Pennoen (The Pennant) published Rodenbach's essays anonymously. Rodenbach maintained his contacts in Roeselare through a committee of correspondence. Their ideology was a mixture of the philosophy Guido Gezelle, with the romantic nationalism of Hendrik Conscience, and the righteousness of true belief. Robenbach and de Mont called their student movement Blauwvoeterie after the blauwvoet (blue-footed booby) whose flight announces the coming storm. The rallying cry of the Blauwvoeterie was Vliegt de blauwvoet, storm op zee! (When the bluefoot flies, there is a storm at sea!) Rodenbach compared it to the German Burschenschaften movement.

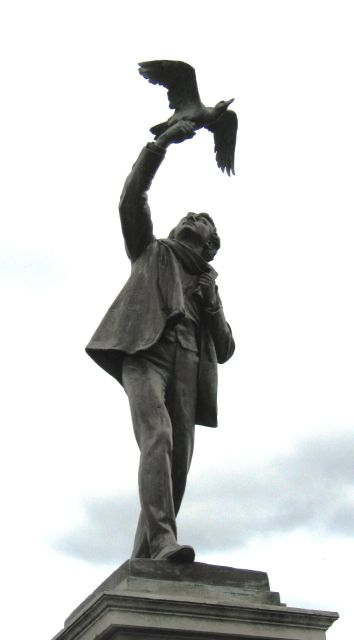
Albrecht Rodenbach statue in Roeselare, Belgium; sculptor Jules Lagae

Additionally, Rodenbach made contacts with the Flemish liberals, such as poet Jan van Beers and author Max Rooses, which served to publicize the movement and to expose its members to more political aims.

Rodenbach died in Roeselare of tuberculosis before his 24th birthday, and almost immediately became the pre-eminent symbol of the Flemish student movement. On Rodenbach's death, Pol de Mont took over the leadership of the "Algemene Vlaamse Studentenbond".

== Literature ==
In 1876 Rodenbach published some essays under the pseudonym "Harold". His book Eerste Gedichten (First Poems) was published in 1878. The rest of his work, including his verse play Gudrun, a dramatized epic of the Vikings, was not published until after his death.

Rodenbach was known at the time of his death for his songs, poems and tonal works which have remained inspiring symbols for the Flemish movement. He was the inspiration for Hendrik Conscience's novel Kerels van Vlaanderen. Flandria Film made a film about him in 1930 entitled Albrecht Rodenbach and directed by Clemens De Landtsheer. The cultural organization Rodenbachfonds was named after him.
