= Adolphe Pierre Sunaert =

Belgian painter (1825–1876)

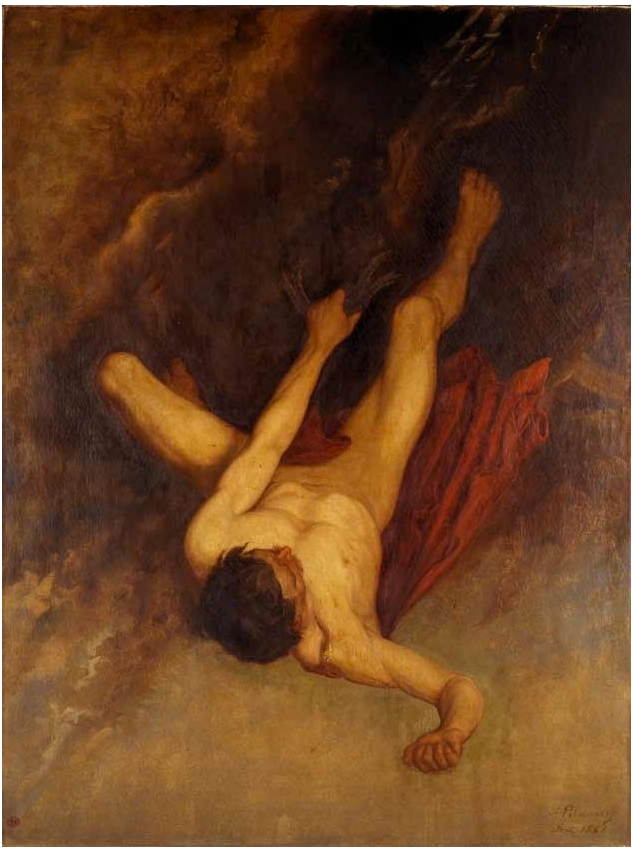
The fall of Phaethon

Adolphe Pierre Sunaert, Adolphe Sunaert or Adolf Sunaert (Ghent, 27 November 1825 – Ghent, 17 April 1876) was a Belgian painter, printmaker, teacher and author. He played a role in the organization and conservation of the art collections of the city of Ghent.

== Life ==
Adolphe Pierre Sunaert was born in Ghent where he trained as a civil engineer at the local School of Civil Engineering and obtained a diploma of teacher of the middle school. At the creation of a special school of industrial design and weaving by the Ghent city council in 1852, Sunaert was appointed to teach the second part of the course. He was sent to Paris and Lyon in France to learn the specialist technical knowledge. When the school was merged with the Industrial School in 1857, Sunaert became professor of the spinning course.

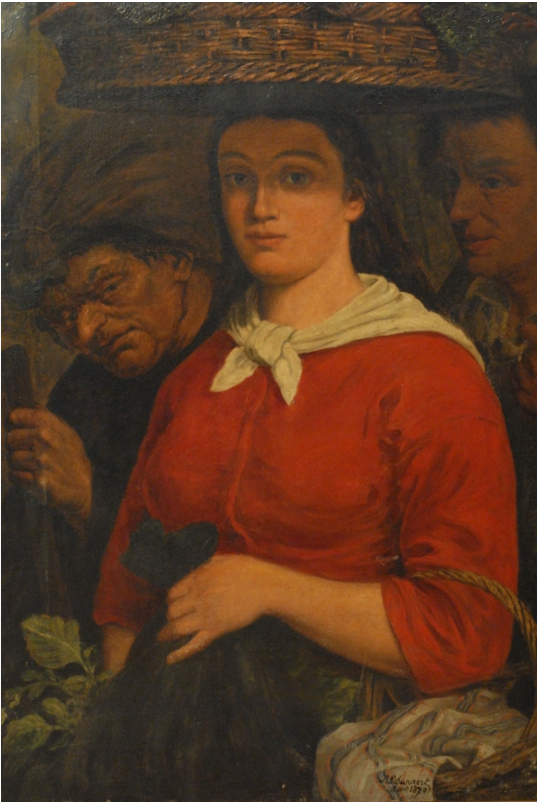
Young woman on a market

On 8 August 1857 Sunaert was appointed professor at the Academy of Fine Arts of Ghent. He taught algebra, geometry, stone cutting and perspective. He drafted two course books in the Dutch language, one on perspective entitled Doorzichtigheid of perspectief (1855) and one on geometry entitled Meetkundige bepalingen en begrippen met toepassingen bestemd voor de leerlingen der klas van lijntekening (1871). He also wrote in collaboration with L. Debaudt a bilingual French-Dutch manual on designs for doors and windowns entitled Recueil de 24 planches de modèles de portes et fenêtres (1875). One of Sunaert's students was the painter Gustave den Duyts who studied spinning and weaving with him.

In 1870 Sunaert prepared a detailed catalogue of the collection of the local museum of fine arts, which was published in French as Catalogue descriptif du Musée de la ville de Gand. A year later, Sunaert, who was a supporter of the cause of the Flemish (Dutch) language in Belgium, published a Dutch-language version of the catalogue the next year. His catalogue provided a detailed description of the works in the museum collection with very careful attributions of the works and received abundant praise.

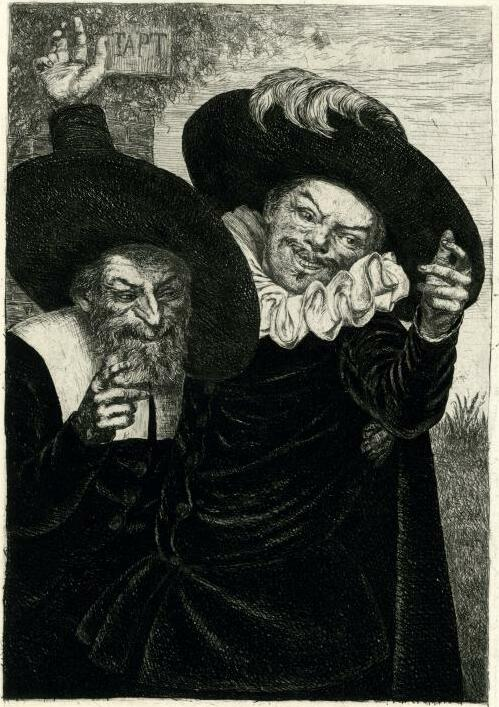
Two men with hats in Dutch seventeenth century costume

The city council of Ghent was of the opinion that the local museum did not receive a sufficient number of visitors. It entrusted Sunaert in 1871 with the task of designing a reorganization of the museum. In his report Sunaert advised that the works of the Flemish artists Gaspar de Crayer and Nicolas de Liemaker be given prominence and that all the works in the collection be presented chronologically. Sunaert's proposals would require some adjustments to the museum building and was rejected by the city council. The Ghent city council also gave Sunaert the task to write a report on the state of all the holdings in the city's art collection located in the civil buildings and churches in the city. His report was issued in 1872 and commenced a tradition of annual inspections of the city's collections. Sunaert was able to recover some objects for the city council and was entrusted to restore others. From 1875 he was a member of the city's local commission of monuments.

Sunaert was active in the 'Liberale Associatie' ('Liberal Association'), the political organization of the liberal party in Ghent. He was co-founder in 1846 of the 'Vlaamsch Gezelschap' ('Flemish Society'), an organization pursuing the emancipation of the Flemish people in Belgium and the recognition of Flemish (Dutch) on an equal footing with the French language in the country. He later joined the Willemsfonds, a cultural organization promoting the Dutch language and Flemish culture. In 1864 Sunaert provided financial support to Julius Vuylsteke in the attempt to establish the Dutch-language 'Liberaal-Nederlandsch Weekblad' ('Liberal-Dutch Weekly') and in 1867 he was involved in the re-establishment of the Flemish Liberale Associatie. Five years later Sunaert was a member, along with Hippolyte Metdepenningen and Auguste de Maere, of the Ghent Committee that sought to celebrate the 1572 capture by the Dutch of Brielle during the Dutch Revolt.

Sunaert was an avid art collector, in particular of prints. He left his large collection of prints to the library of Ghent, where it formed the basis of the library's print cabinet.

== Artistic career ==
Sunaert started his artistic career during his student years when he drew caricatures for satiric Dutch-language journals De Lanteern and De Mascarade. He also created illustrations for a short story of by baron Jules de Saint Genois entitled De grootboekhouder: eene Gentsche vertelling ('The great accountant: a story from Ghent') (1851). He was a member of the 'Kunstverbond' ('Art Association'), which was formed by painters and sculptors in Ghent.

Sunaert only started to paint in his forties. The majority of his paintings are historic and mythological scenes influenced by Rubens. He also made some portraits. He was active as an etcher and created some engravings of portraits and genre scenes.
