= Willemsfonds =

Belgian foundation

The Willemsfonds, named after Jan Frans Willems, is a non-profit cultural organisation founded in the 19th century to promote Flemish culture and language in Belgium. In order to achieve this goal, the organisation encouraged Flemish folk song, organised linguistic games and published inexpensive Flemish books. In addition, the organisation established general libraries.

Nowadays, the Willemsfonds is still a volunteer organisation and a meeting place for cultural activities. It seeks to promote a dialogue between people in order to allow them to form their own opinion. The Willemsfonds is of liberal inspiration, which distinguishes it from the socialist Vermeylenfonds and the Catholic Davidsfonds.

== History ==
The Willemsfonds was founded on 23 February 1851, for the promotion and support of the Dutch language in Flanders (northern Belgium). It was founded by 31 people from Ghent and 7 from Brussels, and since 1868, its headquarters has been in the Lakenmetershuis at the Vrijdagmarkt in Ghent.

In its early days, both Roman Catholics and liberals worked together within the organisation, even Jean-Baptist David was a member of the Willemsfonds. When in 1870, the Roman Catholic Church opposed the non-denominational status of public education, the Willemsfonds sided with the liberals and the Roman Catholics, such as Jean-Baptist David left the organisation, and they founded the Davidsfonds in 1875.

Until 1976, the presidents of the Willemsfonds would come from Ghent, such as its first president Jules de Saint-Genois (1813–1867), Ferdinand Snellaert, Prudens van Duyse, Frans Rens, Jacob Jan Heremans, and Julius Vuylsteke, to name a few.

Over the years, it published the work of several Flemish authors, such as Jan Frans Willems, Reinaert de Vos and Julius de Geyter, Johanna Courtmans-Berchmans, Tony Bergmann, Cyriel Buysse, Virginie Loveling, Maurits Sabbe, Paul Kenis, Karel Jonckheere, Marcel van Maele, Willem Roggeman, and Clem Schouwenaars.

== See also ==
- Davidsfonds
- Flemish literature
- Liberaal Vlaams Verbond
- Liberal Archive
- Masereelfonds
- Rodenbachfonds
