= Davidsfonds =

Belgian cultural foundation

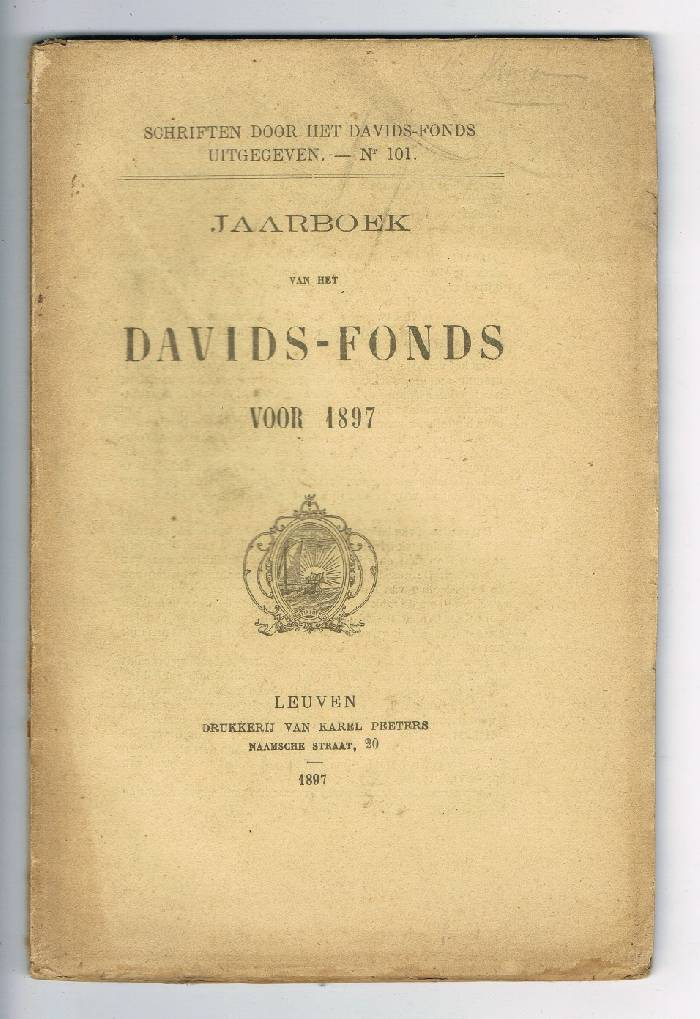
Yearbook Davidsfonds, 1897

The Davidsfonds is a Catholic organisation in Flanders, Belgium with the purpose of promoting the Flemish culture in the areas of literature, history and art.

The Davidsfonds was founded in Leuven, Belgium on 15 January 1875, with the motto Voor Godsdienst, taal en volk (E: For religion, language and people). It was named after canon and professor Jean-Baptist David. Together with the Vermeylenfonds (socialist) and the Willemsfonds (liberal), it promoted the Flemish culture, resulting in a growing feeling of Flemish identity.

In the 20th century, the activities of the Davidsfonds, Vermeylenfonds and Willemsfonds reflected a divided society, based upon political ideology. Called "pillarization" (Dutch: verzuiling), Catholic, socialist, and liberal interests formed parallel organizations (political parties, trade unions, banks, newspapers, cultural, and social circles) to promote their interests. While sometimes leading to wasteful re-duplication the pillars also supported each other (e.g., in labor strikes) when it furthered their own interests.

As of 2005, the organization had 60,000 members and 575 divisions. It organizes cultural activities and publishes a magazine and books.

== See also ==
- Frans de Potter
- Flemish literature
- Masereelfonds
- Rodenbachfonds
- Willemsfonds
