= Jan Frans Willems =

Flemish writer (1793–1846)

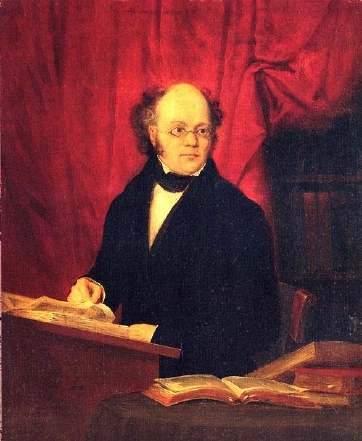
Jan Frans Willems.

Jan Frans Willems (11 March 1793 – 24 June 1846) was a Flemish writer, and the father of the Flemish movement.

Willems was born in the Belgian city of Boechout while it was under French occupation. He started his career in the office of a notary in Antwerp.

He devoted his leisure to literature, and in 1810 he gained a prize for poetry with an ode in celebration of the peace of Tilsit. He hailed with enthusiasm the foundation of the United Kingdom of the Netherlands, and the revival of Flemish literature; and he published a number of spirited and eloquent writings in support of the claims of the native tongue of the Netherlands.

His political sympathies were with the Orange party at the revolution of 1830, and these views led him into trouble with the provisional government. Willems, however, was soon recognized as the unquestioned leader of the Flemish popular movement, the chief plank in whose platform he made the complete equality of the languages in the government and the law courts. He died in Ghent in 1846.

Among his writings, which were quite numerous, the most important were:

- De Kunsten en Wetenschappen (1816)
- Aen de Belgen, Aux Belges (1818)
- Historisch Onderzoek naer den oorsprong en den waren naem der openbare plaetsen en andere oudheden van de stad Antwerpen (1828)

He also produced several learned critical editions of old Flemish texts.

== Bibliography ==
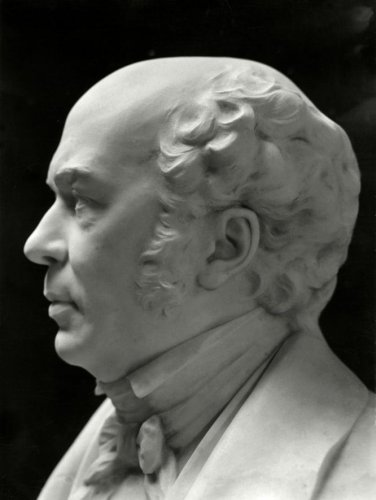
Jan Frans Willems

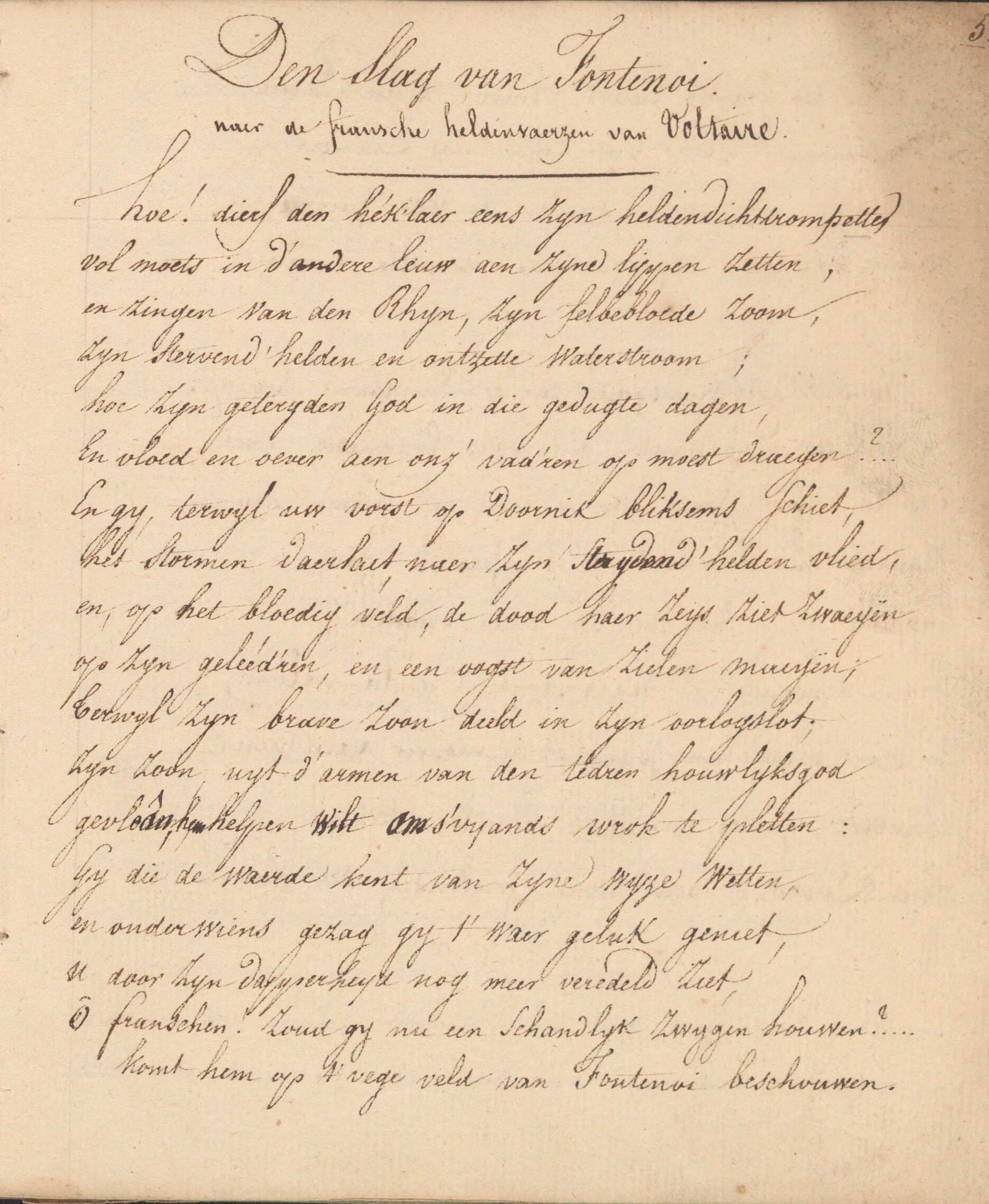
Excerpt from the manuscript Poetic Works, 1807–1815. Written by Jan Frans Willems.

Hekeldicht op den maire en municipaliteyt van Bouchout (1807)

- Hymne aan het vaderland over den veldslag van Friedland en de daeropvolgende Vrede van Tilsit (1812)
- De puyn-hopen rondom Antwerpen (1814, poem)
- Den ryken Antwerpenaer of de hebzugtige neéven (1815)
- Quinten Matsys, of wat doet de liefde niet! (1816)
- Aen de Belgen. Aux Belges (1818, poem)
- Lykrede op Johanns Abraham Terbruggen (1819, prose)
- Verhandeling over de nederduytsche tael- en letterkunde opzigtelijk de Zuydelyke Provintiën der Nederlanden (1819-'24)
- Antwoord van J.F. Willems aen J.B. Buelens, R.C.Pr te Mechelen (1821)
- By 's Konings komst te Antwerpen (1822, poem)
- Redevoering over de poëzy van den dichter en van den schilder (1823)
- Keur van Nederduytsche spreekwoorden en dichterlyke zedelessen (1824)
- Over de Hollandsche en Vlaemsche schryfwyzen van het Nederduitsch (1824, essay)
- Redevoering over het karakter van den Nederlandschen schilder (1825)
- Mengelingen van historisch-vaderlandschen inhoud (1827–1830, essays and publications)
- Bijdragen tot de geschiedenis der boekdrukkunst in Antwerpen (1828, studie)
- Maria van Braband (1828, poem)
- De la langue Belgique. Lettre de Jean François Willems à M. Sylvain Van de Weyer (1829)
- De oude bevolking der provincie Antwerpen (1829, essay)
- La séparation des rats et des souris (1830, fairy tale)
- Voorzeggingen van de Heylige Hildegarde omtrent de Belgische Omwenteling (1831, tekstuitgaven en polemiek)
- Reinardus Vulpus - Reinaert de Vos (1833, essay)
- Over eenige oude Nederlandsche vloeken, eeden en uitroepingen (1834, essay)
- Reinaert de Vos, naer de oudste beryming (1834, restyling)
- Rymkroniek van Jan van Heelu betreffende de slag van Woeringen van het jaer 1288 (1836, texts published)
- Lettres de Marguerite de Parme et du sire de Montigny sur les troubles de Tournai de l'an 1564 (1836)
- Elnonensia. Monuments des langues romanes et tudesque dans le IXe siecle (1837)
- De Brabantsche Yeesten, of Rymkroniek van Brabant door Jan De Klerk, I and II (1839–1843, texts published)
- De la population de quelques villes de la Belgique au moyen-âge (1839, studie)
- Van den Derden Edewaert. Coninc van Engelant, Rymkroniek geschreven omtrent het jaer 1347 door Jan De Klerk (1840, texts published)
- Brief aen Professor Bormans over de tweeklanken IJ en UU (1841)
- Redevoering uitgesproken by de opening van het Vlaemsch feest (1842)
- Pasquyn doctor en astrologant. Kluchtspel van 1782 (1844)
- Kronyk der Kamers van Rhetorica te Lier (1844)
- Notice sur un recueil d'anciennes chansons françaises (1844)
- Mémoires sur les noms de communes de la Flandre Orientale (1845)
- De eerste bliscap van Maria, Misteriespel van 1444 (1845)
- Oude Vlaemsche liederen ten deele met de melodien (1845–1848, finished by Ferdinand Augustijn Snellaert)

== Publications ==
Biographies of Willems have been written by Ferdinand Augustijn Snellaert (Ghent, 1847) and Max Rooses (Antwerp, 1874). (New International Encyclopedia). Also published by Rooses, Julius Vuylsteke, and Anton Bergmann is Jan Frans Willems, (Ghent, 1893).

== See also ==
- Flemish literature
- Willemsfonds

== Sources ==
- Jan Frans Willems
- Jan Frans Willems
