= Julius de Geyter =

Flemish writer (1830–1905)

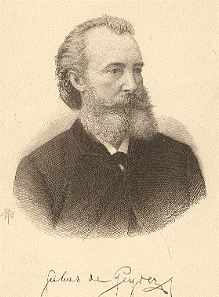
Julius de Geyter

Julius De Geyter (Lede, 25 April 1830 – Antwerp, 18 February 1905) was a Flemish writer born in Lede, Belgium. He started his career as a teacher and journalist. In 1874, he became director of the Bank van Lening in Antwerp. Together with J.F.J. Heremans and E. Zetternam he founded the literary illustrated magazine "De Vlaamsche School", which existed from 1855 until 1862. Together with his friend Julius Vuylsteke he was one of the most important political poets of his time and he was one of the leaders of the Flemish movement. Julius De Geyter is the author of many romantic and political poems, which were mostly rhetorical and sometimes anticlerical. He wrote also to the texts of several cantatas of Peter Benoit, such as the Rubenscantate in 1877. In 1874, he also rewrote the text of Reinaert de Vos in rhyme. He died in Antwerp at age 74.

== Bibliography ==
- Bloemen op een graf (1857)
- Drii menschen van in de wieg tot in het graf (poetry, 1861)
- Reinaart-de-Vos (re-rhyming, 1874)
- Vlaanderens kunstroem (Rubenscantate, 1877)
- De wereld in (1878)
- De muze der geschiedenis (1880)
- De Rhijn (cantata, 1882)
- Keizer Karel en het Rijk der Nederlanden (poetry, 1888)
- Julius De Geyter's werken (1907-1909)

== See also ==
- Flemish literature
