= Vermeylenfonds =

Belgian socialist organization

The Vermeylenfonds is a non-profit Flemish cultural socialist organization. The Vermeylenfonds was founded in 1945, in Brussels with the aim of studying and of continuing the work of August Vermeylen. The Vermeylenfonds was set up within the framework of the enlargement process of the Flemish movement which consisted until then mainly of catholic (Davidsfonds) and liberal (Willemsfonds) organizations. For a long time the Vermeylenfonds also participated in the political debate in Flanders as a lobbying group.

== See also ==
- Masereelfonds
- Rodenbachfonds
- Flemish literature
