= Max Rooses =

Belgian writer, literary critic and curator

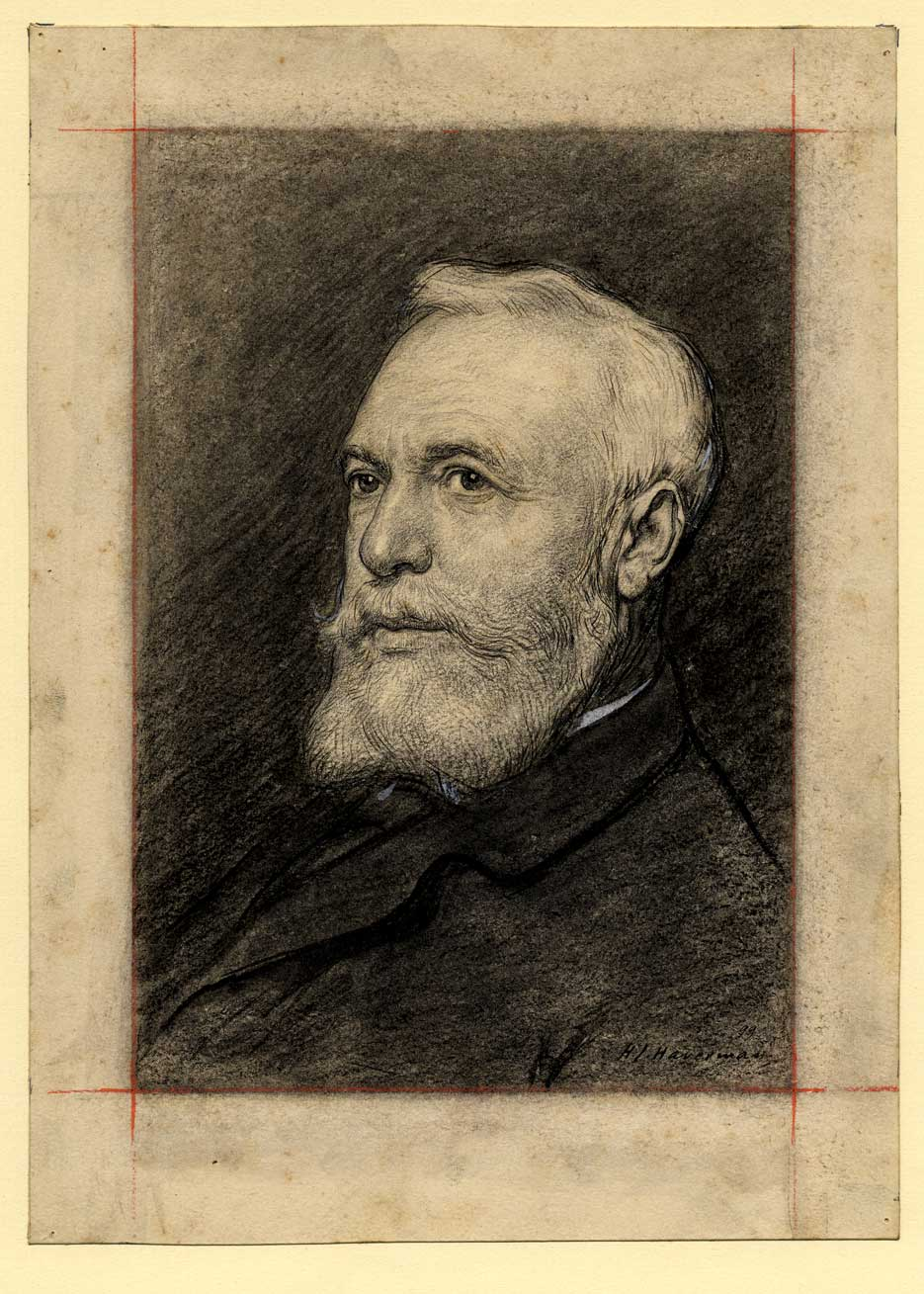
Max Rooses by H. J. Haverman, 1899

Max Rooses (10 February 1839 – 15 July 1914) was a Belgian writer, literary critic, and curator of the Plantin-Moretus Museum at Antwerp.

Rooses was born in Antwerp, and went to school there up to 1858, after which he attended the University of Liège to study Philosophy and Literature. From 1860 until 1864 he was study master at the Koninklijk Athenaeum (Royal Athenaeum) in Antwerp, and in the meantime he graduated with a degree in Literature from the University of Liège. In 1864, he became teacher of Dutch at the Royal Athenaeum of Namur, and in 1866 in Ghent. Finally on 8 July 1876 he was appointed Director of the Plantin-Moretus Museum in Antwerp.

== Bibliography ==
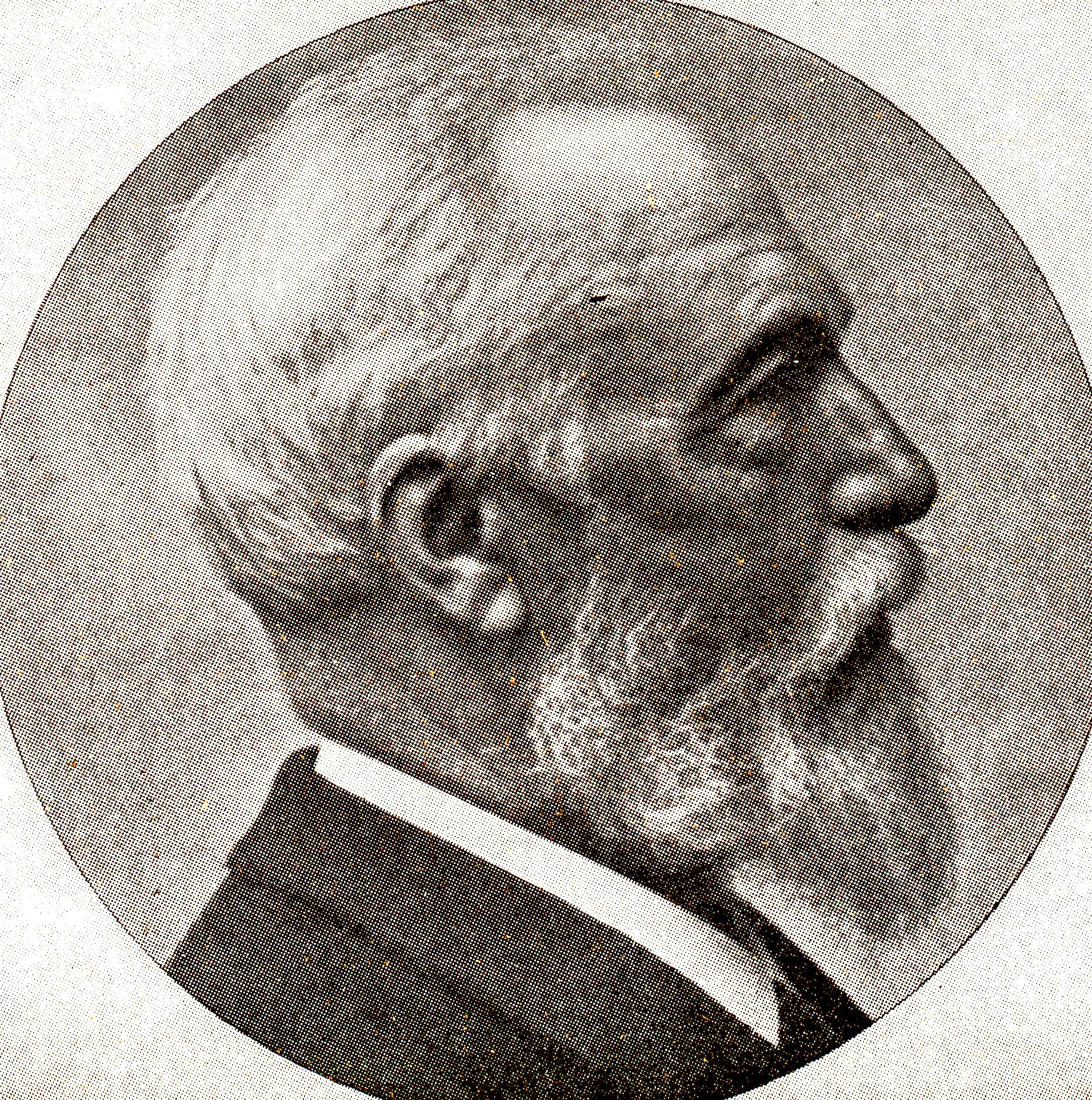
Max Rooses

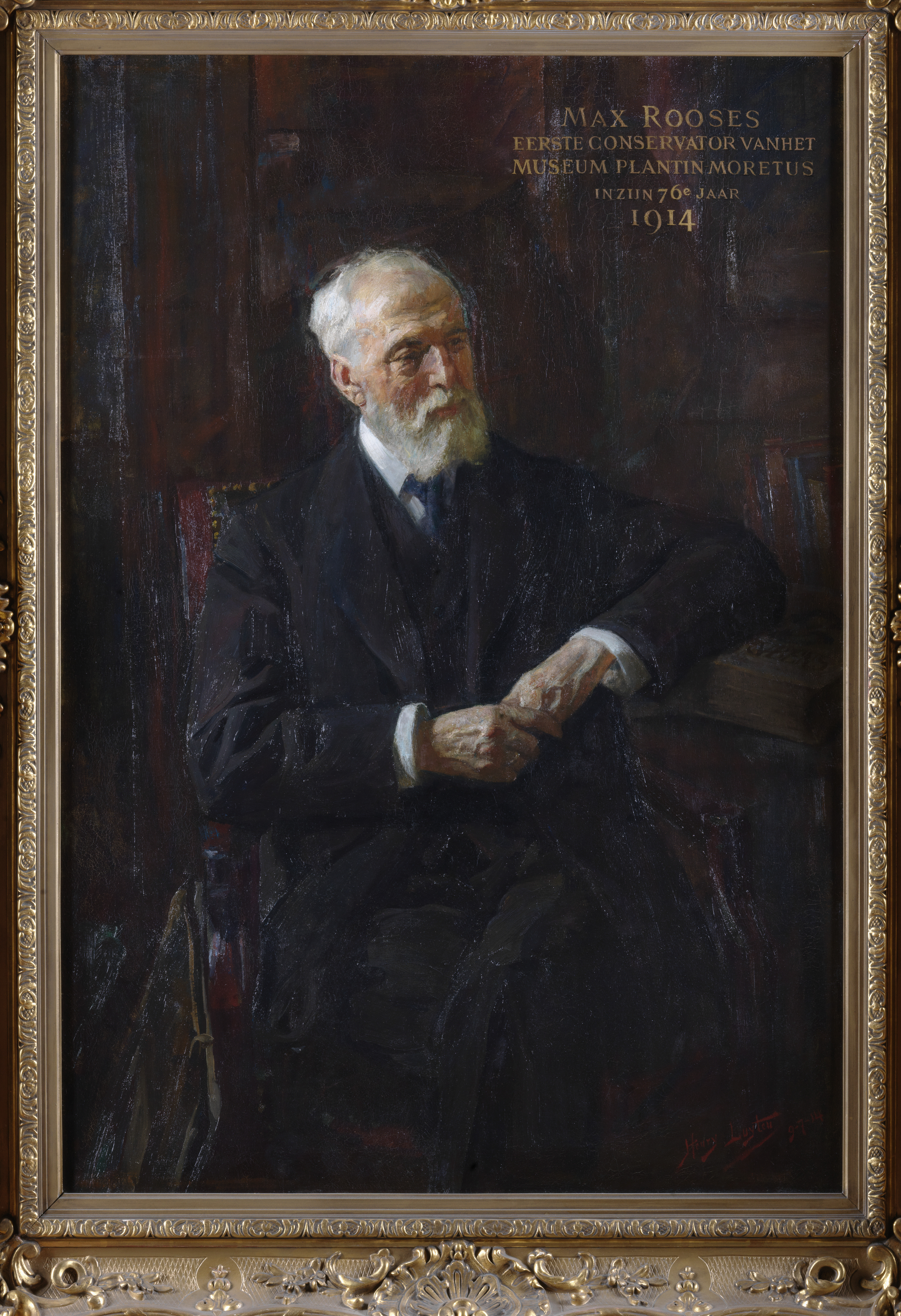
Portrait of Rooses by Henry Luyten

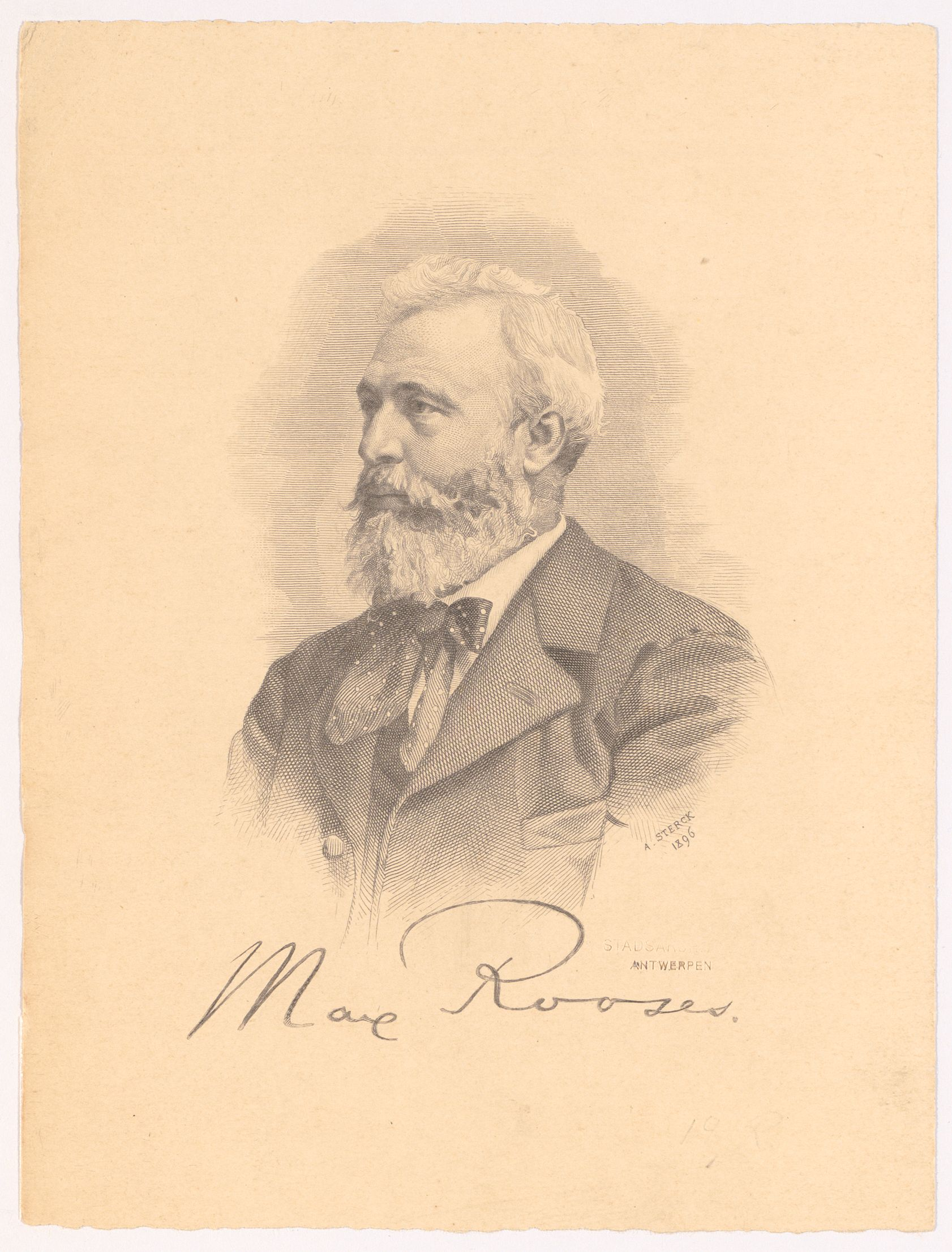
Max Rooses by Arthur Sterck (1896)

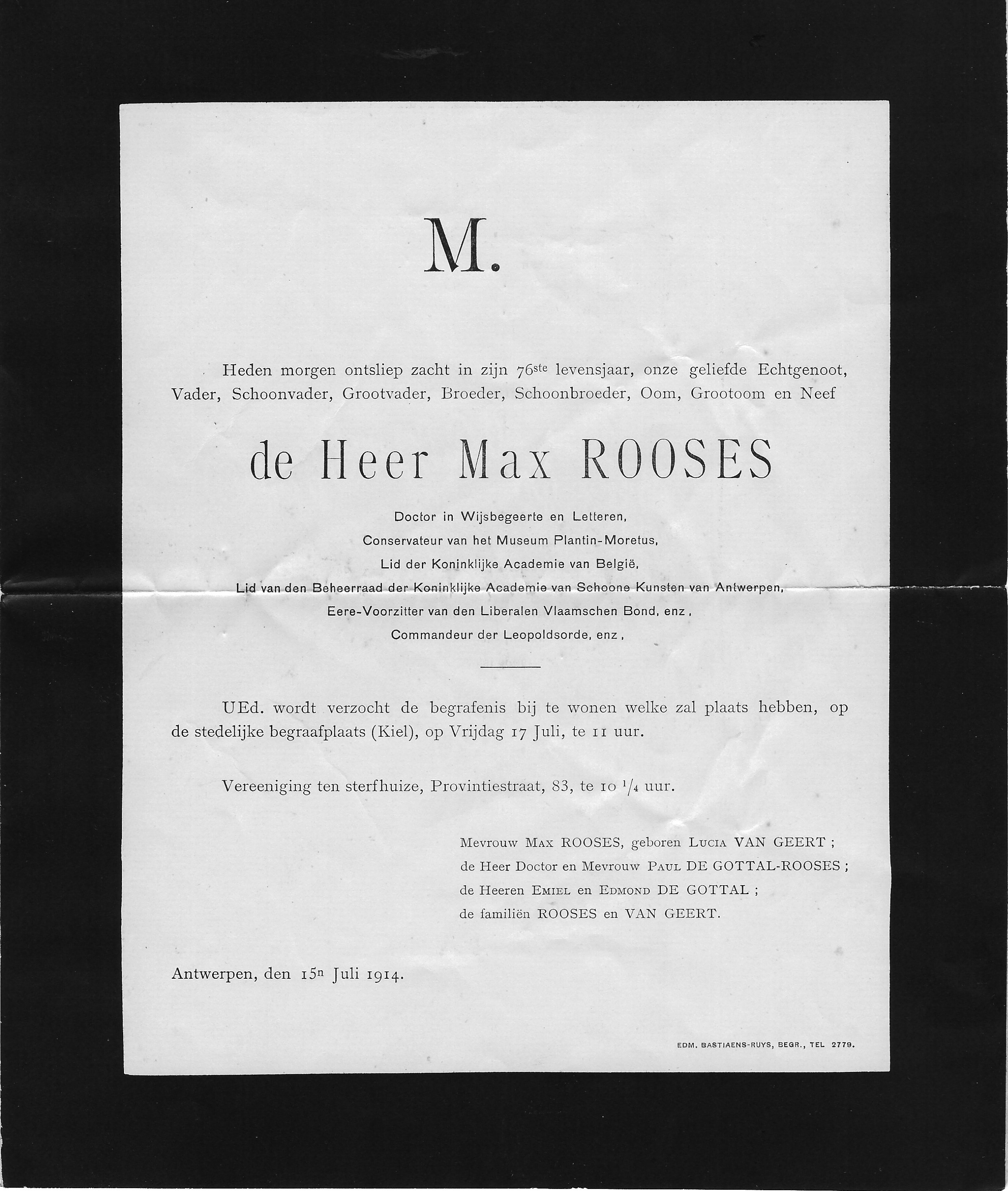
Death letter
- Geschiedenis der Antwerpsche schildersschole (1873) – a history of the Antwerp school of painting
- Levensschets van Jan Frans Willems (1874) – a biography of Jan Frans Willems
- Schetsenboek (1877) – sketchbook
- Over de Alpen (1880)
- Christophe Plantin (1882)
- Correspondance de Chr. Plantin (1883–1911)
- Nieuw schetsenboek (1885)
- Derde schetsenboek (1886)
- L'oeuvre de P.P. Rubens (1886–1892)
- Correspondance de Rubens et documents épistolaires concernant sa vie et ses oeuvres (1887–1909) – Rubens correspondence
- Letterkundige studiën (1894) – literary essays
- Oude en nieuwe kunst (1895–1896)
- Vijftig meesterwerken van Antoon van Dijck (1900)
- Rubens' leven en werken (1903)
- Jordaens' leven en werken (1906)
- Le Musée Plantin-Moretus (1914)

== See also ==
- Flemish literature

== Sources ==
- Max Rooses
- G.J. van Bork and P.J. Verkruijsse, De Nederlandse en Vlaamse auteurs (1985)
- L. C., "Max Rooses", Burlington Magazine, Vol. 25, No. 137 (Aug., 1914): 318
