= Literature of Flanders =

Literature of Flanders or Flemish literature is literature from Flanders, historically a region comprising parts of present-day Belgium, France and the Netherlands. Until the early 19th century, this literature was regarded as an integral part of "Dutch" (Nederlandse) literature. After Belgium became independent from the Netherlands in 1830, the terms Flemish literature and literature of Flanders acquired a narrower meaning, and refer to the Dutch-language literature produced in Belgium. Most of the literature created in Flanders remains part of Dutch-language literature.

== Medieval Flemish literature ==
=== Chronicles ===
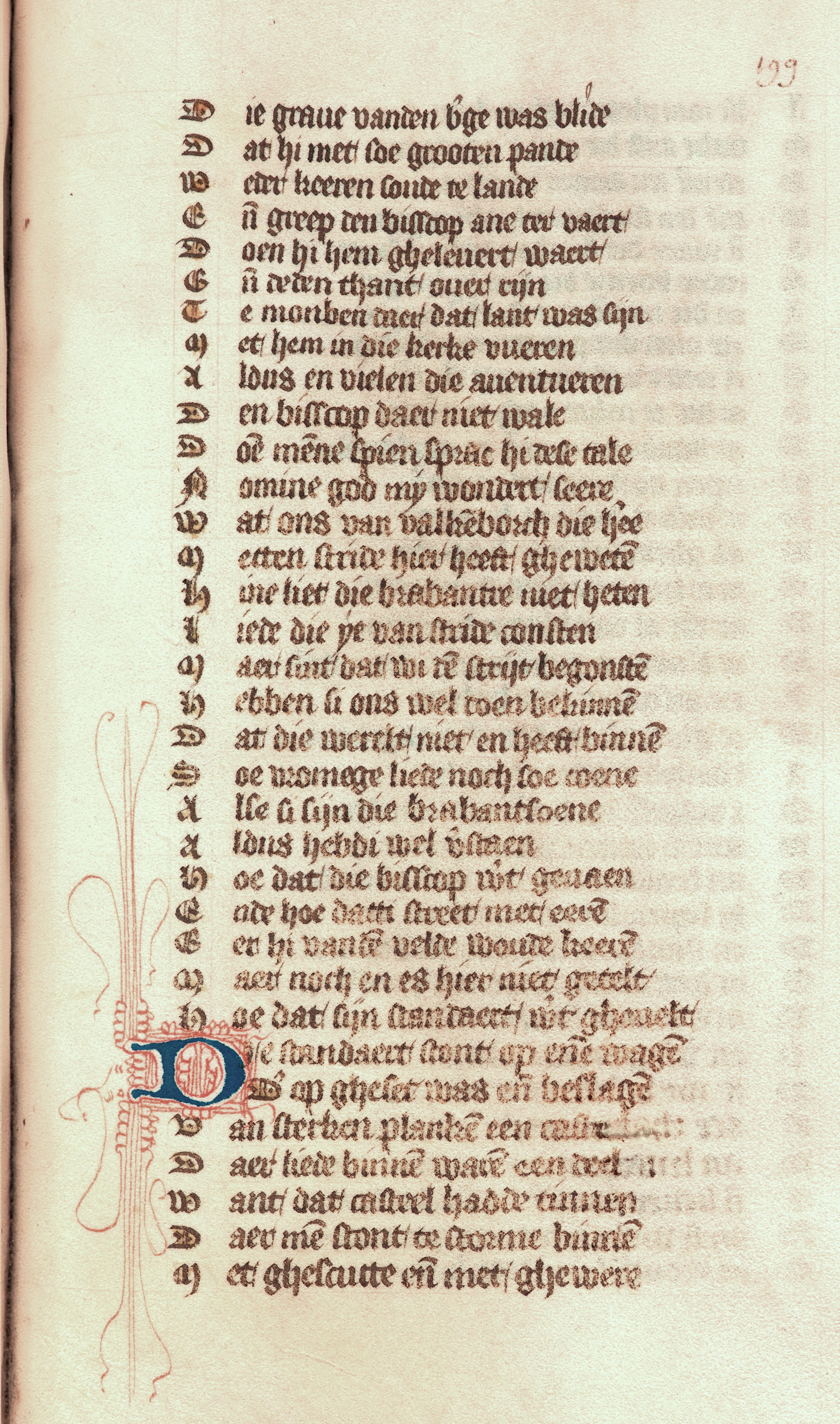
Manuscript KB 76 E 23 - fol 100r of the Rhyming Chronicle of Worringen.

The oldest literary works from the region now known as Flanders (until 1795 roughly comprising the County of Flanders, the heart of the Duchy of Brabant, and the County of Loon) were not written in the Middle Dutch language, but in Latin. Apart from such devotional literature such as hagiography, various local and regional chronicles began to emerge as early forms of historiography. The earliest textual tradition in the County of Flanders was the so-called Flandria Generosa, which started as a very simple and basic genealogy of the counts of Flanders in the late 10th century. In the next stages, called the Genealogia comitum Flandrensium, the texts were updated until the year 1168.

As these initial texts were copied and expanded further by scribes, more narrative elements were added about other groups of people, society as a whole, the landscape and environment, and lots of events and developments in the wider region were included. By 1200, the first translations of Flandria generosa from Latin into Old French started to appear. By the mid-14th century, during the transition from Old to Middle French, the Chronique de Flandre was written, which in turn served as the basis for the Middle Dutch Rhymed Chronicle of Flanders. However, the main branch of the Flandria generosa tradition was the Continuatio Claromariscensis, which by the early 15th century brought forth a family of prose chronicles in Middle Dutch, known as the Excellent Chronicle of Flanders (Excellente Cronike van Vlaenderen).

Chronicle writing in Brabant began much later, in the 13th century, also initially in Latin. One of the first in Middle Dutch was the Rhyming Chronicle of Worringen, a dramatic account of the Battle of Worringen (1288) in praise of the victor John I, Duke of Brabant. The most famous Middle Dutch example is the Brabantsche Yeesten, another rhymed chronicle, until 1351 written by Jan van Boendale.

=== Poetry ===
In the earliest stages of the Dutch language, a considerable degree of mutual intelligibility with some (what we now call) German dialects was present, and some fragments and authors are claimed for both realms. Examples include the 12th-century poet Hendrik van Veldeke, who is claimed by both Dutch and German literature.

In the first stages of Flemish literature, poetry was the predominant form of literary expression. In the Low Countries as in the rest of Europe, courtly romance and poetry were popular genres during the Middle Ages. One such Minnesanger was the aforementioned Van Veldeke. The chivalric epic was a popular genre as well, often featuring King Arthur or Charlemagne (Karel) as protagonist (with notable example of Karel ende Elegast, Dutch for "Charlemagne and the elf-spirit/elf-guest").

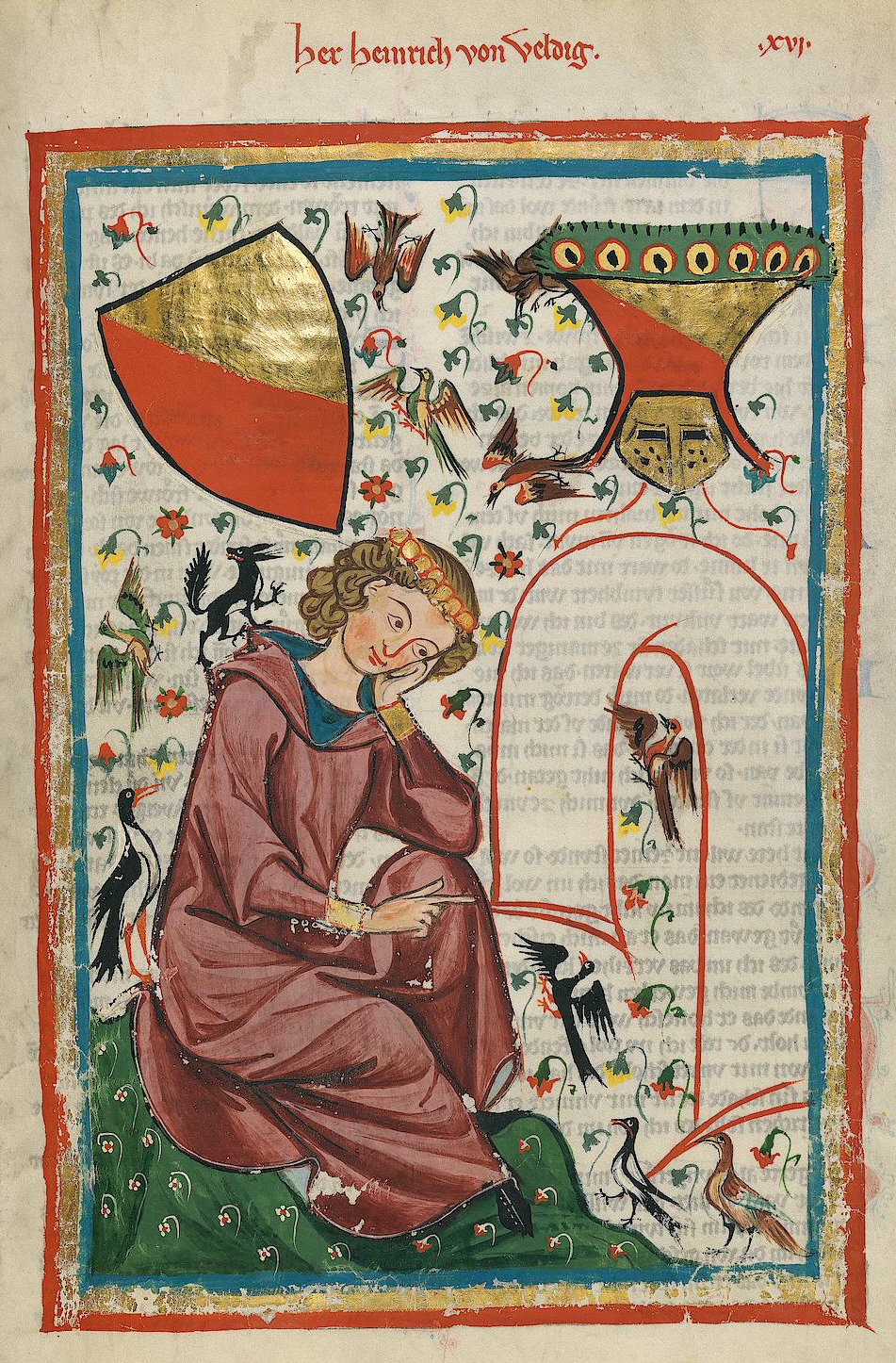
Hendrik van Veldeke in the Codex Manesse, 14th century

The first Dutch language writer known by name is the 12th-century County of Loon poet Hendrik van Veldeke, an early contemporary of Walther von der Vogelweide. Van Veldeke wrote courtly love poetry, a hagiography of Saint Servatius and an epic retelling of the Aeneid in a Limburgish dialect that straddles the Dutch-German language boundary.

A number of the surviving epic works, especially the courtly romances, were copies from or expansions of earlier German or French efforts, but there are examples of truly original works (such as the anonymously written Karel ende Elegast) and original Dutch-language works that were translated into other languages (notable Dutch morality play Elckerlijc formed the basis for the English play Everyman).

=== Legends and folk tales ===
Apart from ancient tales embedded in Dutch folk songs, virtually no genuine folk-tales of Dutch antiquity have come down to us, and scarcely any echoes of Germanic myth. On the other hand, the sagas of Charlemagne and Arthur appear immediately in Middle Dutch forms. These were evidently introduced by wandering minstrels and translated to gratify the curiosity of the noble women. It is rarely that the name of such a translator has reached us. The Chanson de Roland was translated somewhere in the twelfth century, and the Flemish minstrel Diederic van Assenede completed his version of Floris and Blancheflour as Floris ende Blancefloer around 1260.

The Arthurian legends appear to have been brought to Flanders by some Flemish colonists in Wales, on their return to their mother country. Around 1250 a Brabantine minstrel translated the Prose Lancelot at the command of his liege, Lodewijk van Velthem. This adaptation, known as the Lancelot Compilation, contains many differences from the French original, and includes a number of episodes that were probably originally separate romances. Some of these are themselves translations of French originals, but others, such as the Moriaen, seem to be originals. The Gauvain was translated by Penninc and Pieter Vostaert as Roman van Walewein before 1260, while the first wholly original Dutch epic writer, Jacob van Maerlant, occupied himself around 1260 with several romances dealing with Merlin and the Holy Grail.

The earliest existing fragments of the epic of Reynard the Fox were written in Latin by Flemish priests, and about 1250 the first part of a very important version in Dutch, Van den vos Reynaerde ("Of Reynard") was made by Willem. In his existing work the author follows Pierre de Saint-Cloud, but not slavishly; and he is the first really admirable writer that we meet with in Dutch literature. The second part was added by another poet, Aernout, of whom we know little else either.

The first lyrical writer of the Low Countries was John I, Duke of Brabant, who practised the minnelied with success. In 1544 the earliest collection of Dutch folk-songs saw the light, and in this volume one or two romances of the fourteenth century are preserved, of which "Het Daghet in den Oosten" is the best known.

=== Education and exhortation ===
Up until now, the Middle Dutch language output mainly serviced the aristocratic and monastic orders, recording the traditions of chivalry and of religion, but scarcely addressed the bulk of the population. With the close of the thirteenth century a change came over the face of Dutch literature.

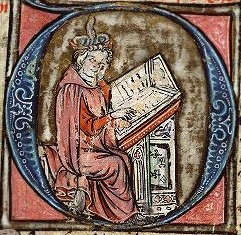
Jacob van Maerlant.

The founder and creator of this original Dutch literature was Jacob van Maerlant. His Der Naturen Bloeme ("The Flower of Nature"), written about 1263, takes an important place in early Dutch literature. It is a collection of moral and satirical addresses to all classes of society. With his Rijmbijbel ("Verse Bible") he foreshadowed the courage and free-thought of the Reformation. It was not until 1284 that he began his masterpiece, De Spieghel Historiael ("The Mirror of History") at the command of Count Floris V.

From the very first the literary spirit in the Low Countries began to assert itself in a homely and utilitarian spirit. Thoroughly aristocratic in feeling was Hem van Aken, a priest of Louvain, who lived about 1255–1330, and who combined to a very curious extent the romantic and didactic elements prevailing at the time. As early as 1280 he had completed his translation of the Roman de la Rose, which he must have commenced in the lifetime of its author Jean de Meung.

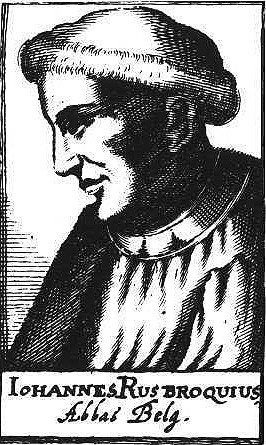
Jan van Ruusbroec.

As for prose, the oldest pieces of Dutch prose now in existence are charters of towns in Flanders and Zeeland, dated 1249, 1251 and 1254. Beatrice of Nazareth (1200–1268) was the first known prose writer in the Dutch language, the author of the notable dissertation known as the Seven Ways of Holy Love. From the other Dutch mystics whose writings have reached us, the Brussels friar Jan van Ruusbroec (better known in English as the Blessed John of Ruysbroeck, 1293/4–1381), the "father of Dutch prose" stands out. A prose translation of the Old Testament was made about 1300, and there exists a Life of Jesus of around the same date.

=== Guilds and festivals ===
The poets of the Low Countries had already discovered in late medieval times the value of guilds in promoting the arts and industrial handicrafts. The term "Collèges de Rhétorique" ("Chambers of Rhetoric") is supposed to have been introduced around 1440 to the courtiers of the Burgundian dynasty, but the institutions themselves existed long before. These literary guilds, whose members called themselves "Rederijkers" or "Rhetoricians", lasted until the end of the sixteenth century and during the greater part of that time preserved a completely medieval character, even when the influences of the Renaissance and the Reformation obliged them to modify in some degree their outward forms. They were in almost all cases absolutely middle class in tone, and opposed to aristocratic ideas and tendencies in thought.

Of these chambers, the earliest were almost entirely engaged in preparing mysteries and miracle plays for the people. Towards the end of the fifteenth century, the Ghent chamber began to exercise a sovereign power over the other Flemish chambers, which was emulated later on in Holland by the Eglantine at Amsterdam. But this official recognition proved of no consequence in literature and it was not in Ghent but in Antwerp that intellectual life first began to stir. In Holland the burghers only formed the chambers, while in Flanders the representatives of the noble families were honorary members, and assisted with their money at the arrangement of ecclesiastical or political pageants. Their Landjuwelen, or Tournaments of Rhetoric, at which rich prizes were awarded, were the occasions upon which the members of the chambers distinguished themselves.

Between 1426 and 1620, at least 66 of these festivals were held. The grandest of all was the festival celebrated at Antwerp on August 3, 1561. The Brussels chamber sent 340 members, all on horseback and clad in crimson mantles. The town of Antwerp gave a ton of gold to be given in prizes, which were shared among 1,893 rhetoricians. This was the zenith of the splendour of the chambers, and after this time they soon fell into disfavour.

Their dramatic pieces produced by the chambers were of a didactic cast, with a strong farcical flavour, and continued the tradition of Jacob van Maerlant and his school. They very rarely dealt with historical or even Biblical personages, but entirely with allegorical and moral abstractions. The most notable examples of Rederijker theatre include Mariken van Nieumeghen ("Mary of Nijmegen") and Elckerlijc (which was translated into English as Everyman).

Of the pure farces of the rhetorical chambers we can speak with still more confidence, for some of them have come down to us, and among the authors famed for their skill in this sort of writing are named Cornelis Everaert of Bruges and Laurens Janssen of Haarlem. The material of these farces is extremely raw, consisting of rough jests at the expense of priests and foolish husbands, silly old men and their light wives.

The chambers also encouraged the composition of songs, but with very little success; they produced no lyrical genius more considerable than Matthijs de Casteleyn (1488–1550) of Oudenaarde, author of De Conste van Rhetorijcken ("The Art of Rhetoric").

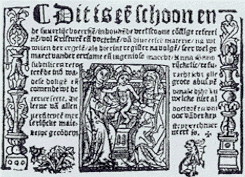
Title page of Anna Bijns' first volume of Refereinen (1528).

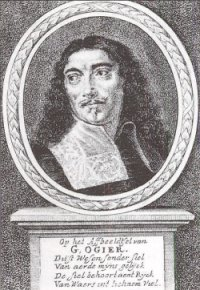
Portrait of Willem Ogier, etching by Gaspar Bouttats for the publication of "De seven hooft-sonden" in 1682

The first writer who used the Dutch tongue with grace and precision of style was a woman and a professed opponent of Lutheranism and reformed thought. Modern Dutch literature practically begins with Anna Bijns (c. 1494–1575). Bijns, who is believed to have been born at Antwerp in 1494, was a schoolmistress at that city in her middle life, and in old age she still instructed youth in the Catholic religion. She died on April 10, 1575. From her work we know that she was a lay nun and that she occupied a position of honour and influence in Antwerp. Bijns' main subjects were faith and the character of Luther. In her first volume of poetry (1528) the Lutherans are scarcely mentioned and the focus is on her personal experience of faith. In the volume of poetry of 1538 every page is occupied with invective against the Lutherans. All the poems of Anna Bijns still extant are of the form called refereinen (refrains). Her mastery over verse form is considered to be remarkable. With the writings of Anna Bijns, the period of Middle Dutch closes and modern Dutch begins.

== Split between North and South ==
Flanders formed a political and cultural whole with the Netherlands until 1579, when as a result of the Reformation the Protestant northern provinces (part of today's Netherlands) split off from the Roman-Catholic south which remained under Spanish rule.

While the Republic of the Seven United Netherlands witnessed its Golden Age, the Southern Netherlands suffered war and misery under Spanish occupation. As the Protestants fled from the Catholic Southern Netherlands, the once prospering port town of Antwerp started to decline as a metropolis and this to the benefit of towns and cities in the Netherlands, like Amsterdam, The Hague, Rotterdam and Utrecht. As a result of these political developments, the literature in the South, Flanders and Brabant changed its character. The flowering of medieval literature came to an abrupt end while in the 17th century the North knew a 'Golden Age' in the arts including literature. With the mass exodus of Flemish intellectuals to the Dutch Republic, literary activity in Flanders virtually came to a halt. In the French occupied part of Flanders a few major figures were active including Dominic De Jonghe (1654–1717) who translated Le Cid by Pierre Corneille into Dutch, the poet Michiel de Swaen (1654–1707) who wrote the epic Het Leven en Dood van Jezus Christus (The Life and Death of Jesus Christ) (1694) and the comedy The gecroonde leerse (The Crowned Boot) and Willem Ogier who is known for the comedy Droncken Heyn (Drunk Heyn) (1639) and a drama series entitled De seven hooft-sonden (The Seven Capital Sins) (1682).

During the 18th century, Flemish literary production was at a low tide. In 1761 Jan Des Roches who was born in The Hague published the Nieuwe Nederduytsche spraek-konst, a Dutch grammar that attempted to challenge the use of Latin as a culture language and French as the language of prestige by elaborating a standardized southern Dutch (Flemish) language. The Brussels lawyer Jan-Baptist Verlooy (1746–1797) wrote the Verhandeling op d'onacht der moederlyke tael in de Nederlanden (Treatise on the negligence of the mother tongue in the Netherlands) (1788), a report on the status of the Dutch language and the contempt with which it was treated in the past.

Other important authors include Willem Verhoeven (1738–1809), Charles Broeckaert (1767–1826) (author of the Flemish popular novel Jelle en Mietje), and Jan-Baptist Hofman (1758–1835), author of middle class tragedies.

== Reunification and new split ==
After the conclusion of the Napoleonic Wars, Belgium and the Netherlands were reunited in 1815 under Dutch rule as the United Kingdom of the Netherlands. The reunification lead to a wider recognition of the Dutch language in Belgium. Resentment of Dutch rule by the French-speaking elites and the Catholic Church created a climate in which the Belgians revolted against Dutch rule in 1830, an event which is known as the Belgian Revolution.

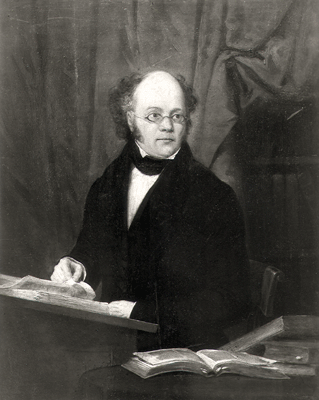
Jan Frans Willems

The immediate result of the Belgian Revolution was a reaction against everything associated with the Dutch, and a disposition to regard the French language as the speech of liberty and independence. The provisional government of 1830 suppressed the official use of the Dutch language, which was relegated to the rank of a patois.

For some years before 1830 Jan Frans Willems (1793–1846) had been advocating the use of the Dutch language. He had done his best to allay the frictions between the Netherlands and Belgium and to prevent a separation. As archivist of Antwerp he had access to direct sources that allowed him to write a history of Flemish literature. After the revolution his Dutch sympathies made it necessary for him to keep a low profile for a while, but in 1835 he settled in Ghent, and devoted himself to the cultivation of the Dutch language. He edited old Flemish classics, such as Reinaert de Vos (1836), the rhyming Chronicles of Jan van Heelu and Jean Leclerc, etc. He gathered around him a group of people such as the chevalier Philip Blommaert (1809–1871), Karel Lodewijk Ledeganck (1805–1847), Frans Rens (1805–1874), Ferdinand Augustijn Snellaert (1809–1872), Prudens van Duyse (1804–1859), and others who wanted to support the use of the Dutch language.

Philipp Blommaert, who was born in Ghent on 27 August 1809, founded in 1834 in his native town the Nederduitsche letteroefeningen, a review for new writers. This magazine was speedily followed by other Flemish organs, and by literary societies for the promotion of Dutch in Flanders. In 1851 a central organization for the Flemish propaganda was provided by a society, named after the father of the movement, the Willemsfonds. The Roman Catholic Flemings founded in 1874 a rival Davidsfonds, called after the energetic Jean-Baptist David (1801–1866), professor at the Universite Catholique de Louvain (Leuven), and the author of a Dutch history book on Belgium (Vaderlandsche historie, Louvain, 1842–1866). As a result of this propaganda the Dutch language was placed on an equality with French in law, and in administration, in 1873 and 1878, and in the schools in 1883. Finally in 1886 a Flemish Academy was established by royal authority at Ghent, where a course in Flemish literature had been established as early as 1854.

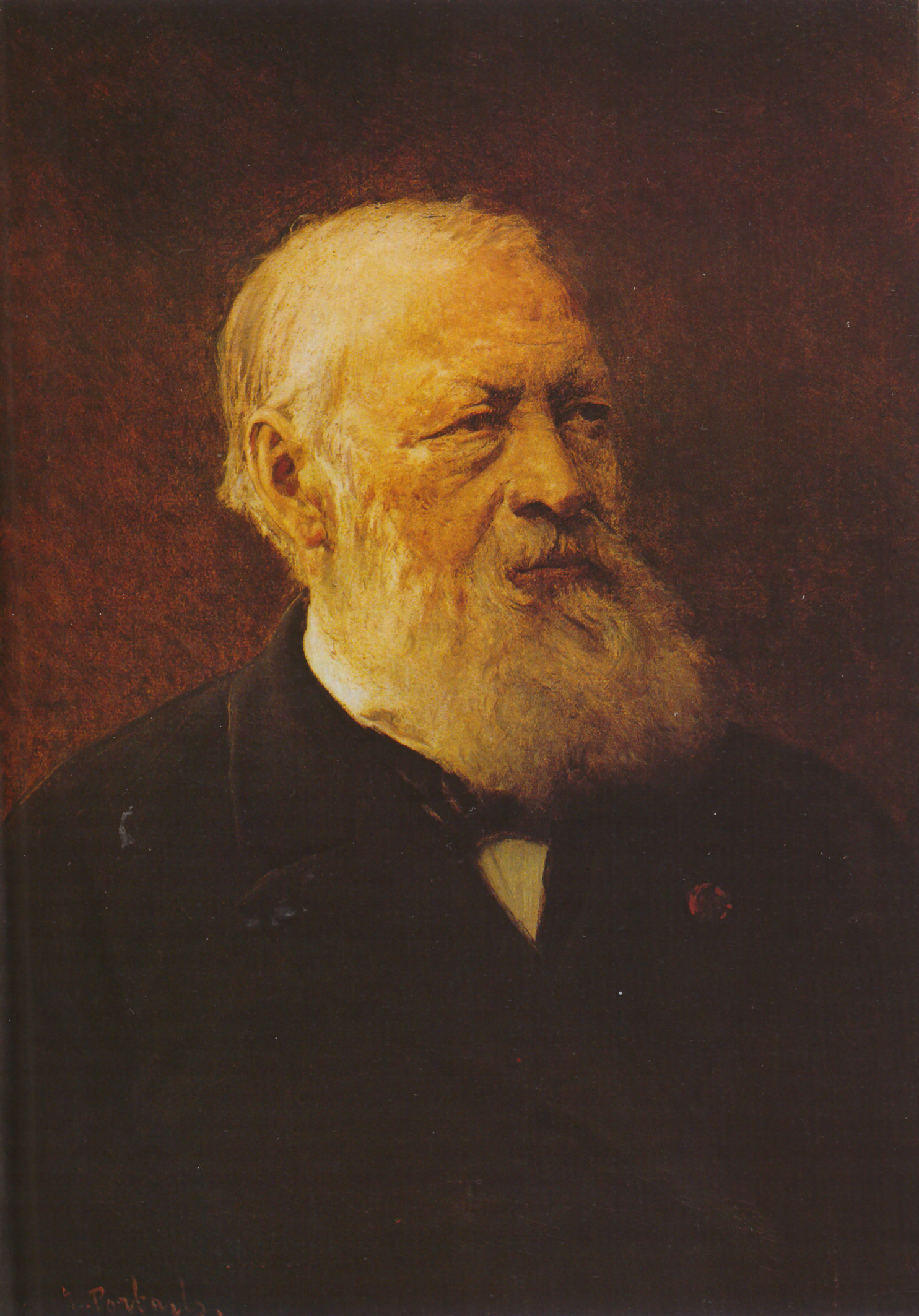
Hendrik Conscience

The claims put forward by the Flemish school were justified by the appearance (1837) of In 't Wonderjaer 1566 (In the Wonderful year) of Hendrik Conscience, who roused national enthusiasm by describing the heroic struggles of the Flemings against the Spaniards. Conscience was eventually to make his greatest successes in the description of contemporary Flemish life, but his historical romances and his popular history of Flanders helped to give a popular basis to a movement which had been started by professors and scholars.

The first poet of the new school was Karel Lodewijk Ledeganck, the best known of whose poems are those on the three sister cities of Bruges, Ghent and Antwerp (De drie zustersteden, vaderlandsche trilogie, Ghent, 1846), in which he makes an impassioned protest against the adoption of French ideas, manners and language, and the neglect of Flemish tradition. The book speedily took its place as a Flemish classic. Ledeganck, who was a magistrate, also translated the French code into Dutch. Jan Theodoor van Rijswijck (1811–1849), after serving as a volunteer in the campaign of 1830, settled down as a clerk in Antwerp, and became one of the hottest champions of the Flemish movement. He wrote a series of political and satirical songs, admirably suited to his public. The romantic and sentimental poet, Jan van Beers, was typically Flemish in his sincere and moral outlook on life. Prudens van Duyse, whose most ambitious work was the epic Artevelde (1859), is perhaps best remembered by a collection (1844) of poems for children. Peter Frans Van Kerckhoven (1818–1857), a native of Antwerp, wrote novels, poems, dramas, and a work on the Flemish revival (De Vlaemsche Beweging, 1847).

Antwerp produced a realistic novelist in Jan Lambrecht Domien Sleeckx (1818–1901). An inspector of schools by profession, he was an indefatigable journalist and literary critic. He was one of the founders in 1844 of the Vlaemsch Belgie, the first daily paper in the Flemish interest. His works include a long list of plays, among them Jan Steen (1852), a comedy; Gretry, which gained a national prize in 1861; Vissers van Blankenberge (1863); and the patriotic drama of Zannekin (1865). His talent as a novelist was diametrically opposed to the idealism of Conscience. He was precise, sober and concrete in his methods, relying for his effect on the accumulation of carefully observed detail. He was particularly successful in describing the life of the shipping quarter of his native town. Among his novels are: In't Schipperskwartier (1856), Dirk Meyer (1860), Tybaerts en Cie (1867), Kunst en Liefde (Art and Love, 1870), and Vesalius in Spanje (1895). His complete works were collected in 17 volumes (1877–1884).

Jan Renier Snieders (1812–1888) wrote novels dealing with North Brabant; his brother, August Snieders (1825–1904), began by writing historical novels in the manner of Conscience, but his later novels are satires of contemporary society. A more original talent was displayed by Anton Bergmann (1835–1874), who, under the pseudonym of Tony, wrote Ernest Staas, Advocaat, which gained the quennial prize of literature in 1874. In the same year appeared the Novellen of the sisters Rosalie (1834–1875) and Virginie Loveling (1836–1923). These simple and touching stories were followed by a second collection in 1876. The sisters had published a volume of poems in 1870. Virginie Lovelings gifts of fine and exact observation soon placed her in the front rank of Flemish novelists. Her political sketches, In onze Vlaamsche gewesten (1877), were published under the name of W. G. E. Walter. Sophie (1885), Een dure Eed (1892), and Het Land der Verbeelding (1896) are among the more famous of her later works. Reimond Stijns (1850–1905) and Isidoor Teirlinck (1851–1934) produced in collaboration one very popular novel, Arm Vlaanderen (1884), and some others, and have since written separately. Cyriel Buysse, a nephew of Virginie Loveling, is a disciple of Émile Zola. Het Recht van den Sterkste (The Right of the Strongest, 1893) is a picture of vagabond life in Flanders; Schoppenboer (The Knave of Spades, 1898) deals with brutalized peasant life; and Sursum corda (1895) describes the narrowness and religiosity of village life.

In poetry, Julius de Geyter (1830–1905), author of a rhymed translation of Reinaert (1874), an epic poem on Charles V (1888), etc. produced a social epic in three parts, Drie menschen van in de wieg tot in het graf (Three Men from the Cradle to the Grave, 1861), in which he propounded radical and humanitarian views. The songs of Julius Vuylsteke (1836–1903) are full of liberal and patriotic ardour; but his later life was devoted to politics rather than literature. He had been the leading spirit of a students association at Ghent for the propagation of Flemish views, and the Willemsfonds owed much of its success to his energetic co-operation. His Uit het studentenleven appeared in 1868, and his poems were collected in 1881. The poems of Mme van Ackere (1803–1884), née Maria Doolaeghe, were modelled on Dutch originals. Joanna Courtmans (1811–1890), née Berchmans, owed her fame rather to her tales than her poems; she was above all a moralist and her fifty tales are sermons on economy and the practical virtues. Other poets were Emmanuel Hiel, author of comedies, opera libretti and some admirable songs; the abbot Guido Gezelle, who wrote religious and patriotic poems in the dialect of West Flanders; Lodewijk de Koninck (1838–1924), who attempted a great epic subject in Menschdom Verlost (1872); Johan Michiel Dautzenberg (1808–1869) from Heerlen, author of a volume of charming Volksliederen. The best of Dautzenberg's work is contained in the posthumous volume of 1869, published by his son-in-law, Frans de Cort (1834–1878), who was himself a songwriter, and translated songs from Robert Burns, from Jacques Jasmin and from German. The Makamen en Ghazelen (1866), adapted from Rückert's version of Hariri, and other volumes by Jan Ferguut (J. A. van Droogenbroeck, 1835–1902) show a growing preoccupation with form, and with the work of Gentil Theodoor Antheunis (1840–1907), they prepare the way for the ingenious and careful workmanship of the younger school of poets, of whom Charles Polydore de Mont was the leader. He was born at Wambeke in Brabant in 1857, and became professor in the academy of the fine arts at Antwerp. He introduced something of the ideas and methods of contemporary French writers into Flemish verse; and explained his theories in 1898 in an Inleiding tot de Poezie. Among Pol de Mont's numerous volumes of verse dating from 1877 onwards are Claribella (1893), and Iris (1894), which contains amongst other things a curious Uit de Legende van Jeschoea-ben-Josief, a version of the gospel story from a Jewish peasant.

Mention should also be made of the history of Ghent (Gent van den vroegsten Tijd tot heden, 1882-1889) by Frans de Potter (1834–1904), and of the art criticisms of Max Rooses (1839–1914), curator of the Plantin-Moretus Museum in Antwerp, and of Julius Sabbe (1846–1910).

== 20th century ==
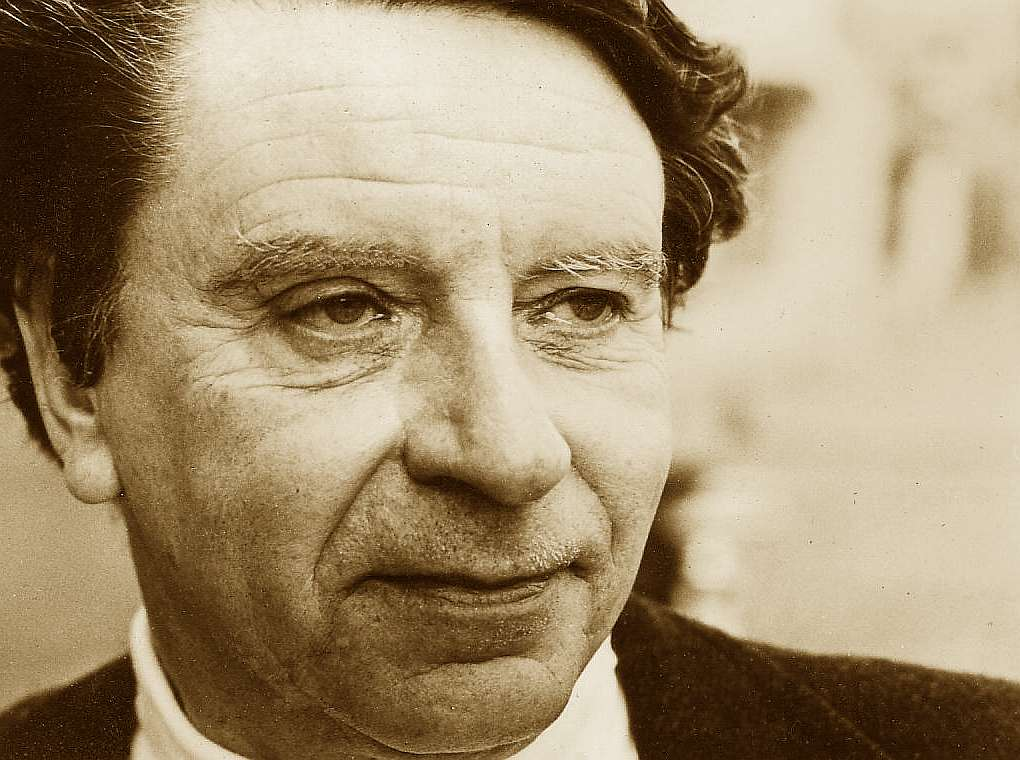
Hubert Lampo (photo Tom Ordelman)

In the twentieth Century Flemish literature evolved further and was influenced by the international literary evolution. Cyriel Buysse and Stijn Streuvels were influenced by the naturalist literary fashion, while Felix Timmermans was a neo-romanticist.

After World War I the poet Paul van Ostaijen was an important representative of expressionism in his poems. In between World War I and World War II, Gerard Walschap, Willem Elsschot and Marnix Gijsen were prominent Flemish writers. After World War II the first avant-garde magazine Tijd en Mens (E: Time and People) was published from 1949 up to 1955. In 1955 it was succeeded by Gard Sivik (E: Civil Guard) (up to 1964), with Hugues C. Pernath and Paul Snoek. The most prominent Flemish Vijftiger (E: Generation fifties) was Hugo Claus, who plays an important role in Flemish literature since then. Other postwar poets were Anton van Wilderode and Christine D'Haen. Some of the writers who made their debut after 1960 are Eddy Van Vliet, Herman de Coninck, Roland Jooris, Patrick Conrad and Luuk Gruwez.

The renewal of the Flemish prose immediately after World War II was the work of Hugo Claus and Louis Paul Boon. Johan Daisne and Hubert Lampo introduced magic realism in Flemish literature. Ivo Michiels and Paul De Wispelaere represented the new novel. In the eighties Walter van den Broeck and Monika van Paemel continued to write in the style of Louis Paul Boon.

Other contemporary authors are Ward Ruyslinck and Jef Geeraerts, Patrick Conrad, Kristien Hemmerechts, Eric de Kuyper, Stefan Hertmans, Pol Hoste, Paul Claes, Jan Lauwereyns, Anne Provoost and Jos Vandeloo. In the nineties the Generation X, with Herman Brusselmans and Tom Lanoye made their debut on the Flemish literary scene.

=== Overview ===
- Johan Anthierens (1937–2000)
- Pieter Aspe (Pierre Aspeslag, 1953–2021)
- Aster Berkhof (Lode Van Den Bergh, born 1920)
- Louis Paul Boon (1912–1979)
- Herman Brusselmans (born 1957)
- Libera Carlier (1926–2007)
- Ernest Claes (1885–1968)
- Paul Claes (born 1943)
- Hugo Claus (1929–2008)
- Patrick Conrad (born 1945)
- Johan Daisne (Herman Thiery, 1912–1978)
- Herman De Coninck (1944–1997)
- Saskia de Coster (born 1976)
- Filip De Pillecyn (1891–1962)
- Rita Demeester (1946–1993)
- Willem Elsschot (1882–1960)
- Fritz Francken (1893–1969)
- Marnix Gijsen (1899–1984)
- Maurice Gilliams (1900–1982)
- Luuk Gruwez (born 1953)
- Kristien Hemmerechts (born 1955)
- Stefan Hertmans (born 1951)
- Karel Jonckheere (1906–1993)
- Paul Kenis (1885–1934)
- Eric de Kuyper (born 1942)
- Hubert Lampo (1920–2006)
- Tom Lanoye (born 1958)
- Jan Lauwereyns (born 1969)
- Maurice Maeterlinck (1862–1949)
- Tom Naegels (born 1975)
- Alice Nahon (1896–1933)
- Leo Pleysier (born 1945)
- Anne Provoost (born 1964)
- Jean Ray (John Flanders) (1887–1964)
- Willem Roggeman (born 1935)
- Maria Rosseels (1916–2005)
- Maurits Sabbe (1873–1938)
- Paul Snoek (1933–1981)
- Stijn Streuvels (1871–1969)
- Herman Teirlinck (1879–1967)
- Jotie T'Hooft (1956–1977)
- Felix Timmermans (1886–1947)
- Ernest Van der Hallen (1898–1948)
- Marcel van Maele (1931–2009)
- Paul van Ostaijen (1896–1928)
- Paul Verhaeghen (born 1965)
- Peter Verhelst (born 1962)
- Dimitri Verhulst (born 1972)
- Gerard Walschap (1898–1989)
- Lode Zielens (1901–1944)

== See also ==
- Antwerp Book Fair
- Archive and Museum for the Flemish Culture
- Belgian literature
- Chamber of rhetoric
- Dutch-language literature
- List of Dutch writers
- Middle Dutch literature
- 19th-century Dutch literature
- Literature of Suriname

== References (from 19th century) ==
- This article in turn cites:
  - Ida van Düringsfeld, Von der Schelde bis zur Mass. Des geistige Leben der Vlamingen (Leipzig, 3 vols., 1861)
  - J. Stecher, Histoire de la littérature néerlandaise en Belgique (1886)
  - Theodoor Coopman and L. Scharpé, Geschiedenis der Vlaamsche Letterkunde van het jaar 1830 tot heden (1899)
  - A. de Koninck, Bibliographie nationale (3 vols., 1886–1897)
  - Paul Hamelius, Histoire poétique et littéraire du mouvement flamand (1894)
  - Frans de Potter, Vlaamsche Bibliographie, issued by the Flemish Academy of Ghent — contains a list of publications between 1830 and 1890
  - W. J. A. Huberts et al., Biographisch woordenboeck der Noord- en Zuid-Nederlandsche Letterkunde (1878)
