= Joanna Courtmans =

Flemish writer (1811–1890)

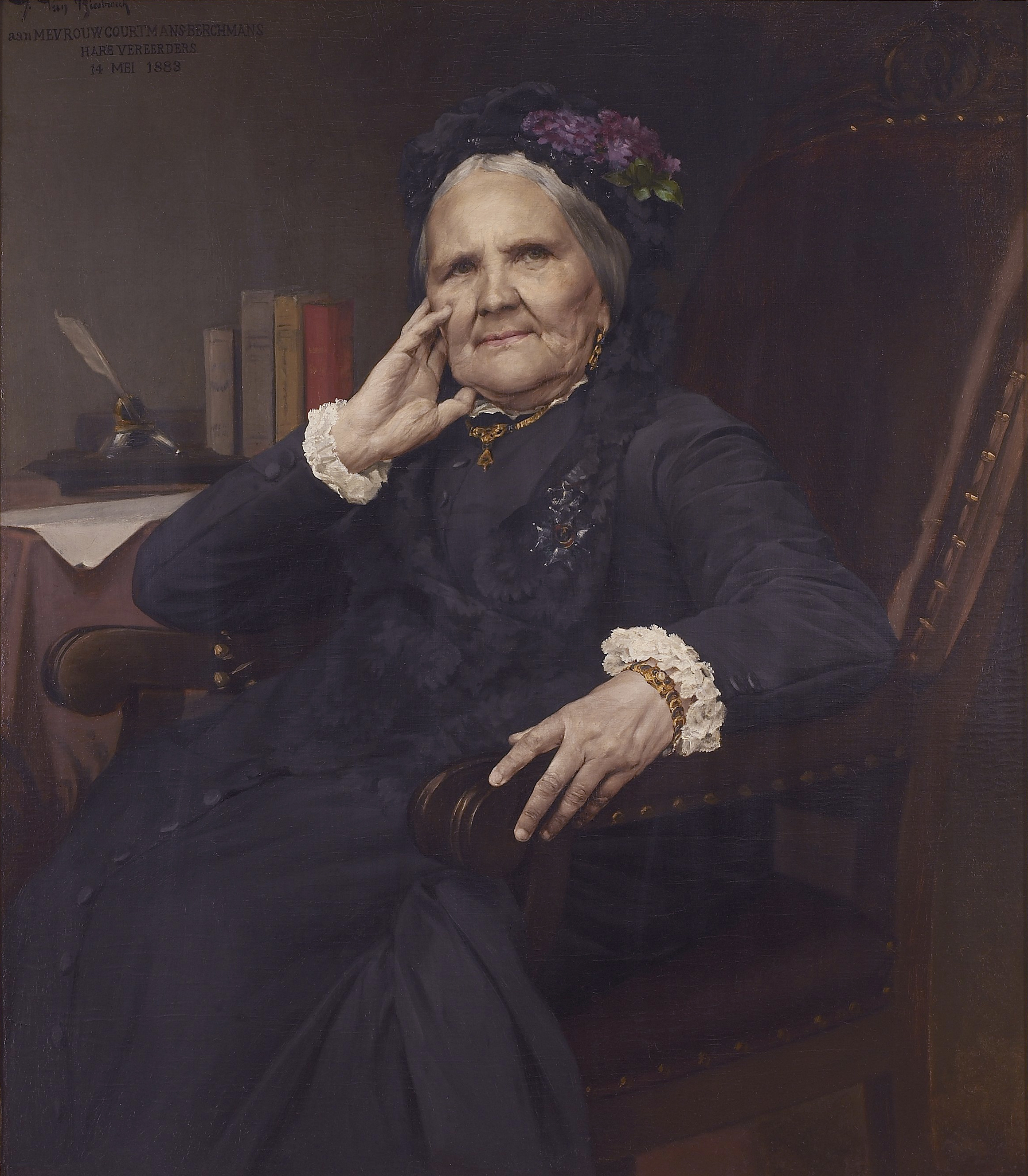
- portrait by Jules Evarist van Biesbroeck
- Born: Joanna-Desideria Berchmans; 6 September 1811; Oudegem
- Died: 22 September 1890 (aged 79); Maldegem
- Occupation: writer

Joanna Courtmans, born Joanna-Desideria Berchmans (6 September 1811 – 22 September 1890), was a Belgian writer.

== Biography ==
Her father was mayor of Oudegem, and she spent her first years at the local village school, later at the age of 9, she was sent to a boarding school in Wallonia. Between 1835 and 1844, she lived in Ghent, initially with her aunt Colette Tanghe. In 1836, she married Jan Baptiste Courtmans, a teacher in Ghent, who was one of the co-founders of the Gentse Maetschappij van Vlaemsche Letteroefening. This brought her into contact with the Flemish movement, and Prudens van Duyse, Frans Rens, Ferdinand Snellaert, and Jan Frans Willems. It inspired her to write an historical novel Bertha Baldwin (1871), about the 14th century battle of the Flemings against France.

Her husband taught her Flemish again, after which she wrote her first poem in 1839, which was published in the Nederduitsch letterkundig jaarboekje. In the following years she won several prizes for her poems. In 1844 they moved to Lier. When in 1856 her husband died, and she stayed behind with eight young children. To earn a living, she opened a boarding school in Maldegem, but it was not a success and she had to close the school. The Koninklijk Atheneum Mevrouw Courtmans (E:Royal Athenaeum Madam Courtmans) is now located at the same location, in the Mevrouw Courtmanslaan. Although she was a pious catholic, she reacted against the so-called catholic schools (Dutch: Kantscholen), which she considered to be centers of underpaid child labor, and which did no pay enough attention to reading, mathematics, geography and history. Her position in the schoolstrijd (E: schoolbattle), earned her the scorn of the local clergy.

As a writer, she started to write in prose at a later age, but her first novels, such as Helena van Leliëndal were not very successful. However, gradually she became famous both in Belgium as well as in the Netherlands, and created an extensive literary oeuvre. Probably her most famous novel, Het geschenk van de jager (Fr: Le Cadeau du chasseur, E: gift of the hunter) (1865), was rewarded with the Quinquennial Prize for Dutch Literature.

== Selected works ==
- Marie-Theresia (poetry, 1841)
- Pieter de Coninck (poetry, 1842)
- Philippinne van Vlaanderen (poetry, 1842)
- België's eerste koningin (poetry, 1842)
- Lof van het pausdom (poetry, 1843)
- Margaretha van Brabant (poetry, 1845)
- Marnix van Ste-Aldegonde (poetry, 1855)
- Helena van Leliëndal (prose, 1855)
- Vlaamse poëzij (poetry, 1856)
- Karel de Stoute (poetry, ?)
- Jacob van Artevelde (poetry, ?)
- Kindergedichten (poetry, ?)
- De burgemeester van 1819 (prose, 1861)
- Edeldom (prose, 1862)
- Anna de bloemenmaagd (prose, 1862)
- Het geschenk van de jager (prose, 1862)
- De gemeenteonderwijzer (prose, 1862)
- De zwarte hoeve (prose, 1863)
- Livina (prose, 1863)
- Drie novellen (De bloem van Cleyt – De zoon van de molenaar – De bondgenoot) (prose, 1864)
- Griselda (prose, 1864)
- Drie testamenten (prose, 1865)
- De hut van tante Klara (prose, 1865)
- Genoveva van Brabant (prose, 1866)
- Het plan van Heintje Barbier (prose, 1866)
- De schuldbrief (prose, 1866)
- De zaakwaarnemer (prose, 1867)
- Nicolette (prose, 1868)
- Moeder Daneel (prose, 1868)
- Tijdingen uit Amerika (prose, 1868)
- Eens is genoeg (prose, 1869)
- De zoon van de mosselman (prose, 1870)
- Christina van Oosterwei (prose, 1871)
- Bertha Baldwin (prose, 1871)
- Moeders spaarpot (prose, 1871)
- De wees van het Rozenhof (prose, 1872)
- Tegen wil en dank (prose, 1872)
- Het rad der fortuin (prose, 1873)
- De koewachter (prose, 1873)
- Verscheurde bladen (prose, 1874)
- De gezegende moeder (prose, 1876)
- Karel Klepperman (prose, 1878)
- Rozeken Pot (prose, 1879)
- De hoogmoedige (prose, 1882)

== See also ==
- Flemish literature

== Sources ==
- Joanna Desideria Courtmans-Berchmans
- Joanna-Desideria Berchmans
