= Rita Demeester =

Belgian poet and writer (1946–1993)

- Born: Rita Bertha Maria Demeester; 26 September 1946; Roeselare, Belgium
- Died: 29 January 1993 (aged 46); Genk, Belgium
- Occupations: poet, writer

Rita Bertha Maria Demeester (26 September 1946 – 29 January 1993) was a Belgian poet and writer.

== Biography ==
She was born at Roeselare. She obtained a degree in social pedagogy from the Catholic University of Leuven. She worked as an educationalist, but started writing when she became unemployed in 1986. Demeester died at Genk in 1993.

== Awards ==
- 1989 - Rabobank Lenteprijs voor Literatuur for In het spoor van Jim Morrison

== Bibliography ==
- 1988 - Krappe herinnering
- 1988 - Vrouwentongen. Verhalen, essays en reisreportages (works of 11 Flemish female writers, composed by Veerle Weverbergh) (ISBN 9050670563)
- 1989 - Stampvoeten in het donker (verhalen) (ISBN 9029039647) (ISBN 9063032641)
- 1991 - Droomjager (verhalen) (ISBN 9029035625) (ISBN 9063033230)
- 1994 - Land van Belofte (verhalen) (ISBN 9029049871) (ISBN 9063035497)
- 1995 - Verzamelde werken (ISBN 9029048956) (ISBN 9063036264)

== See also ==
- Flemish literature

== Sources ==
- Rita Demeester in de Digitale Bibliotheek voor de Nederlandse Letteren
