= Roland Jooris =

Flemish writer and poet

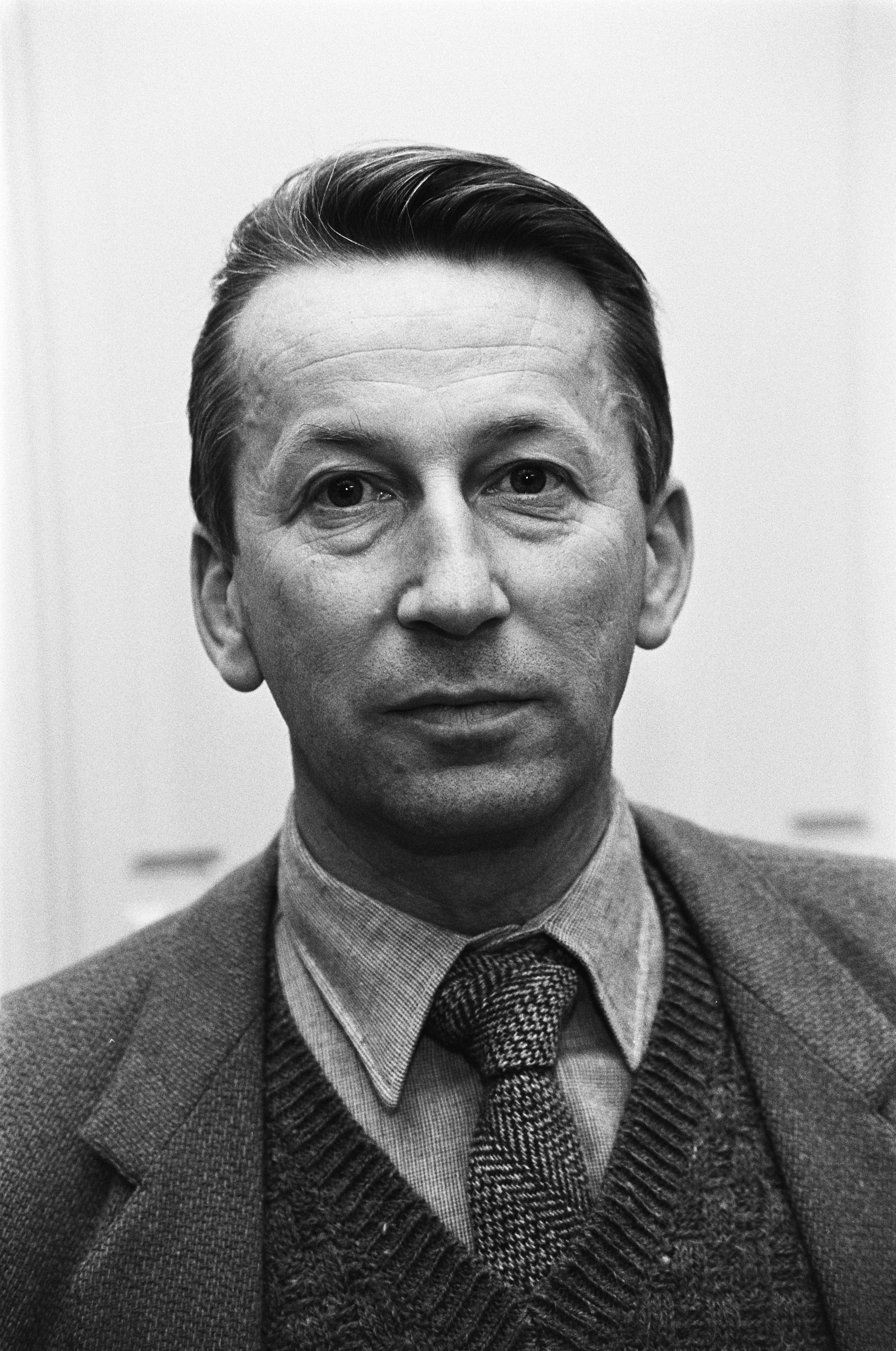
- Roland Jooris (1979)
- Born: 22 July 1936 (age 90); Wetteren, Belgium
- Occupations: poet, writer

Roland Jooris (born 22 July 1936) is a Belgian poet and writer on contemporary art. He was born at Wetteren. Jooris graduated as a teacher for secondary education (high school) in Germanic languages and was a teacher at the State Technical Institute in Lokeren.

== Bibliography ==
- Gitaar (1956)
- Bluebird (1958)
- Een konsumptief landschap (1969)
- Laarne (1971)
- More is less (1972)
- Raoul de Keyser (1972) (essay)
- Het vierkant op het einde van de zomer (1974)
- Het museum van de zomer (1974)
- Atelier (1975), interviews
- Bladstil (1977)
- Roger Raveel en Beervelde (1979) (essay)
- Akker (1982)
- Gedichten 1958–1978 (1987)
- Geschilderd of geschreven (?)
- Gekras (2001)
- De contouren van het verstrijken (2008)

== Awards ==
- 1976 - Tweejaarlijkse prijs voor poëzie van De Vlaamse Gids
- 1979 - Jan Campertprijs for Gedichten 1958–78
- 1981 - Prijs van de Vlaamse Provincies

== See also ==
- Flemish literature

== Sources ==
- Roland Jooris (in Dutch)
- Roland Jooris (in Dutch)
