= Ernest Van der Hallen =

Ernest Van der Hallen (Lier, June 2, 1898 - there, February 24, 1948) was a Flemish writer and Catholic youth leader during the Interbellum. Van der Hallen was an inspirational figure for the Flemish nationalist youth movement.

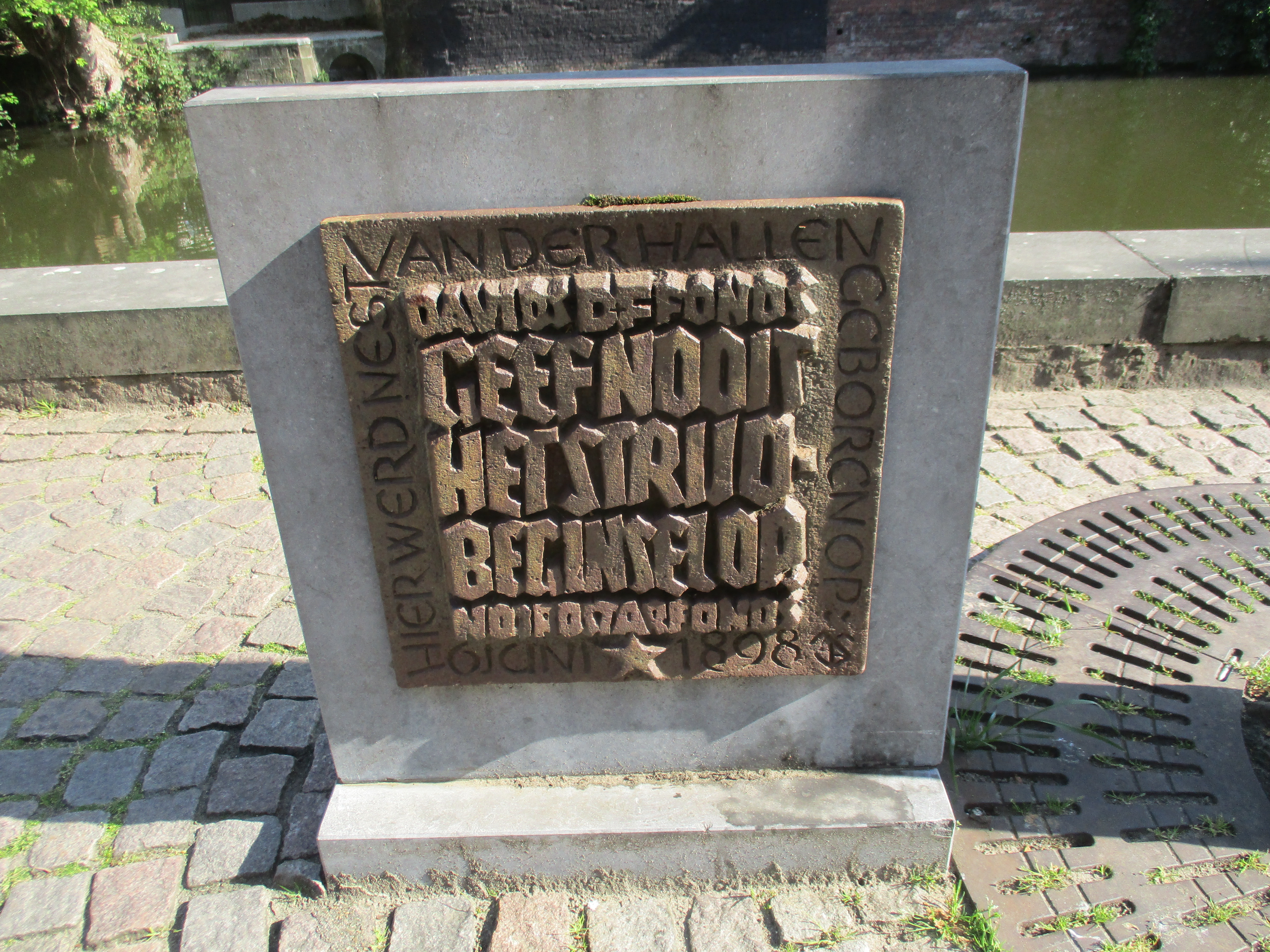
Memorial plate Ernest Van der Hallen near his birthplace

== Books ==
- Ridder Arnold (1924)
- Sprookjes uit de zomernacht (1924)
- Stille uren bij primitieve meesters (1924)
- Begenadigden uit mystiek Vlaanderen (1925)
- Kristiaan de godsgezant (1928)
- Liturgisch gebedenboek voor studenten (1931)
- Brieven aan een jonge vriend (1932)
- De wind waait (1932, verhalen)
- Een jongen uit Vlaanderen (1934)
- Zes dagen (1935)
- De aarde roept (1936)
- Charles de Foucauld (1937)
- Tussen Atlas en Pyreneeën (1938)
- Cheiks, pelgrims en rabbijnen (1940)
- Oost-zuid-oost. Herinneringen aan Lybië, Egypte, Syrië en Turkije (1941)
- Op eigen grond (1942)
- Het vertelsel van den dichter zonder hart (1942)
- Brouwer (1943, biography of Adriaen Brouwer)
- Steden in vlammen (1943)
- Vertelsels in juni (1944)
- Kroniek der onnozele kinderen (1947)
- Felix Timmermans (1948)
- Brieven aan Elckerlyc (1948, under the name J. van de Wijngaert)
- Vreemdelingenlegioen (1948)
- Vaarwel, mijn vriend (1949)

== Sources ==
- Armand Boni: Ernest Van der Hallen, een silhouet; Davidsfonds - Leuven, 1950
- Bonifaas Luykx: "De wind waait", Ernest Van der Hallen, begenadigde en jeugdleider; Bertennest - Kortrijk, 1999
