= Paul Kenis =

Flemish writer

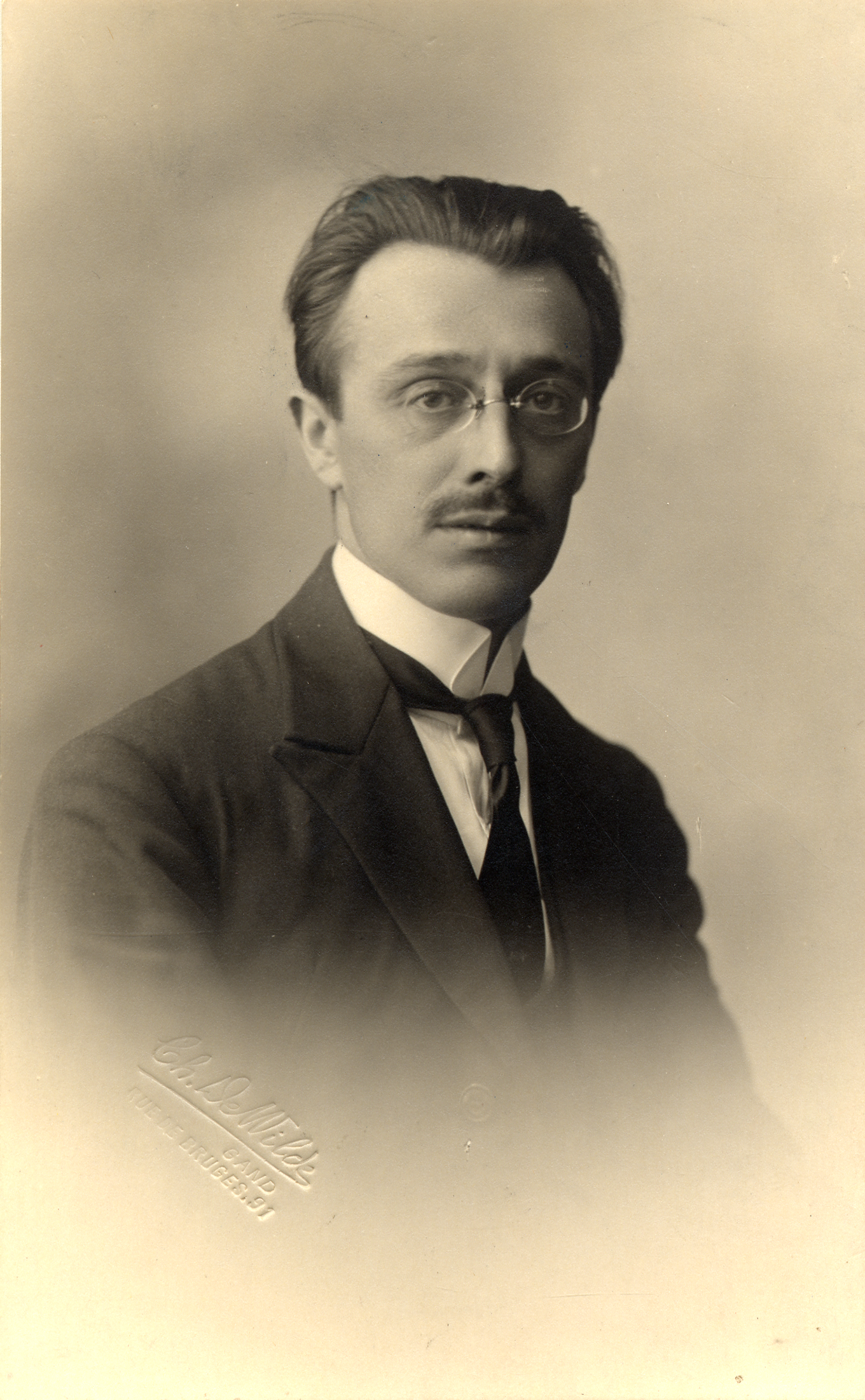
Paul Kenis 1925

Paul Kenis (11 July 1885 in Bocholt – 28 July 1934 in Brussels) was a Flemish writer.

== Education ==
He attended high school in Turnhout and in Ghent and studied Germanic languages at the University of Ghent.

== Career ==
After he had done some historical research in libraries in Paris, he started working at the ministry of Finances in Brussels. He founded and edited the illustrated magazines De Boomgaard (E:the orchard) and Het Roode Zeil (E:the red sail), mad contributions to Elsevier, Groot-Nederland, De Nieuwe Rotterdamsche Courant, and was secretary of the Vereniging van Vlaamse Letterkundigen (E: Association of Flemish Writers).

== Bibliography ==
- De roman van een jeugd. Een ondergang in Parijs (1914)
- De wonderbare avonturen van Cies Slameur (1919)
- De kleine mademoiselle Cérisette (1921)
- Fêtes galantes (1924)
- De lokkende wereld (1927)
- Uit het dagboek van Lieven de Myttenaere, lakenkooper te Gent (1927)
- Het leven van meester François Villon (1928)
- De apostelen van het nieuwe rijk (1930)
- Een overzicht van de Vlaamsche letterkunde na Van Nu en Straks (1930)
- Het leven van E. Anseele (1930)
- Historische verhalen (1944)

== See also ==
- Flemish literature

== Sources ==
- Paul Kenis (Dutch)
- Paul Kenis (Dutch)
