= Antwerp Book Fair =

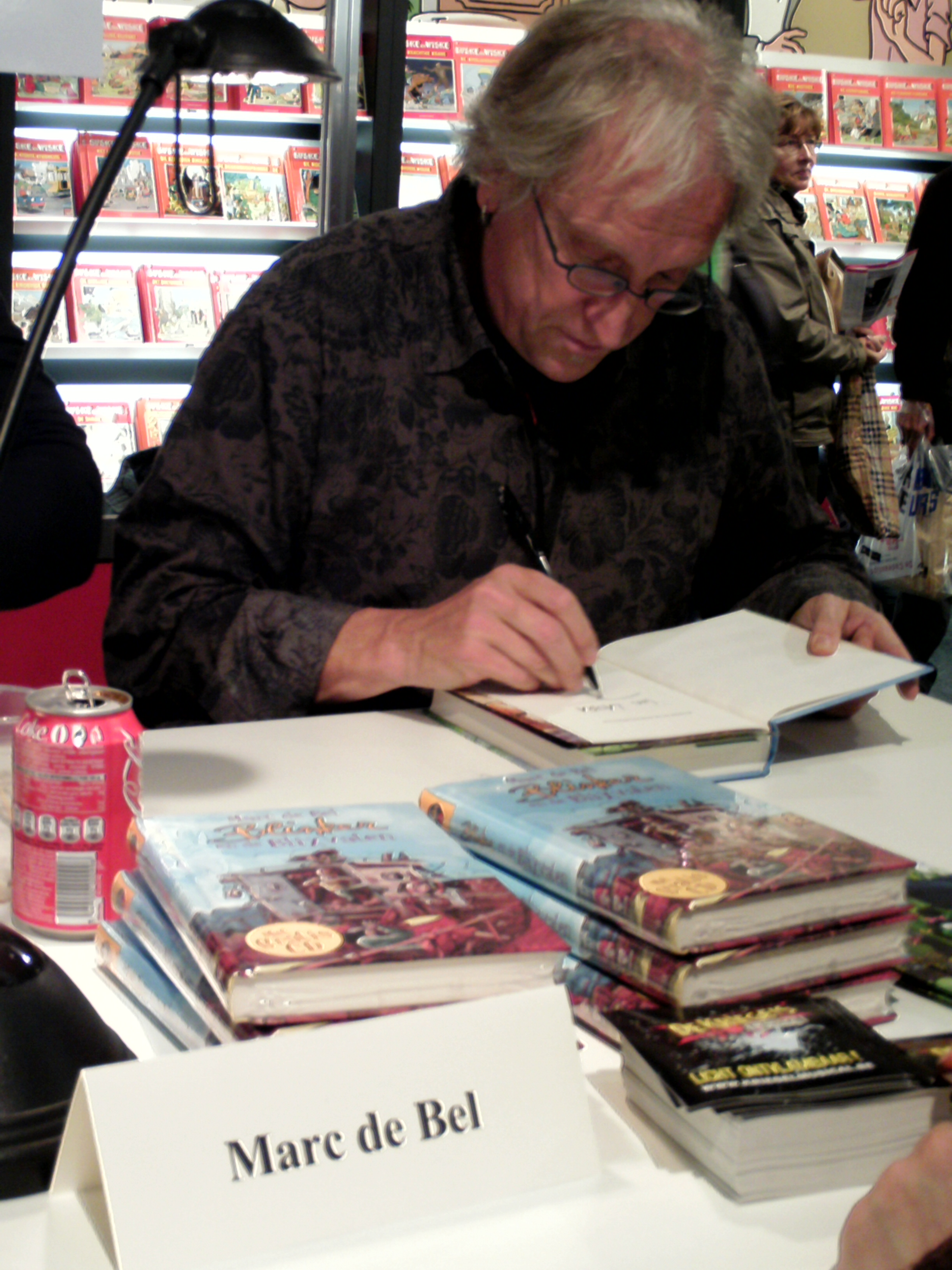
Author Marc de Bel at the 2008 fair.

The Antwerp Book Fair (Dutch: (Antwerpse) Boekenbeurs) is a large trade fair for books, held annually at the beginning of November in Antwerp Expo, Antwerp, Belgium.

The Fair is a business to consumer fair attended by book publishers and book sellers and organized by Boek.be.

The Fair began in 1932. In 1972, when it was hosted in one of the remaining building of the 1971 World Expo, it received 85,000 visitors. In 2016, in the same location, it received 150,000 visitors.

In 2013, the Fair was the site of an attempt to set a new world record for the longest book domino chain, using almost 5,000 books. At the time, Cape Town Library held the record, with 2,586 books.

In 2016, the fair hosted an exhibit by bookseller Bol.com and DDB Brussels of a machine that could sign books for absentee and deceased authors.

The 2021 Fair was cancelled due to the COVID-19 pandemic.

== See also ==
- Flemish literature
