= Eugene van Maldeghem =

Flemish artist (1813–1867)

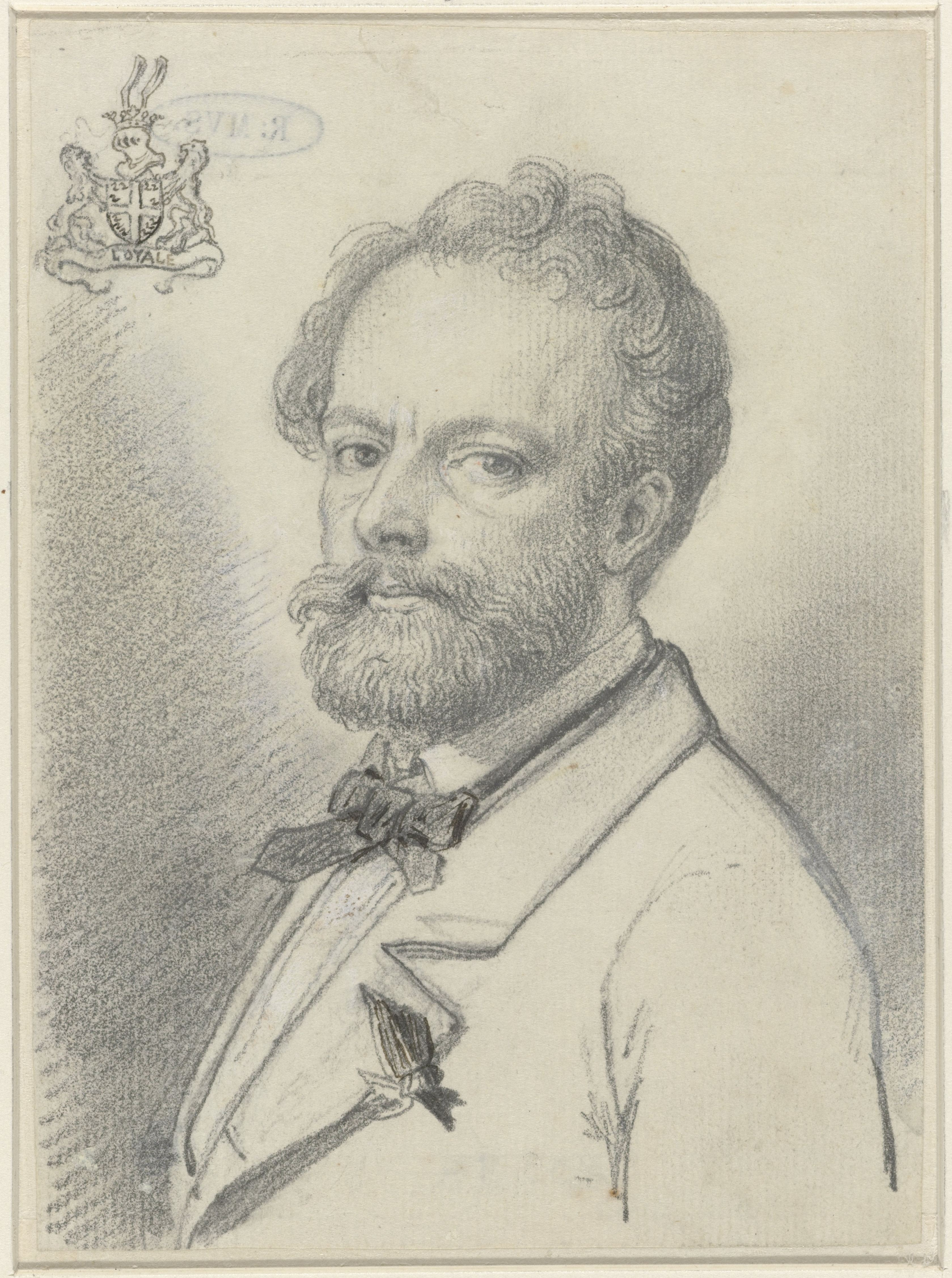
Self portrait by Eugeen van Maldeghem

Eugene van Maldeghem, also known as Romaan Eugeen Van Maldeghem, (24 April 1813, Dentergem – 1867, Elsene) was a Flemish painter of history, landscape, and portraits. He was a pupil of G. Wappers. The Museum of Fine Arts, Ghent contains his 'Charles V. at the Hospital of St. Just', and the Brussels Museum contains his 'The Bishop St. Alphonse'.

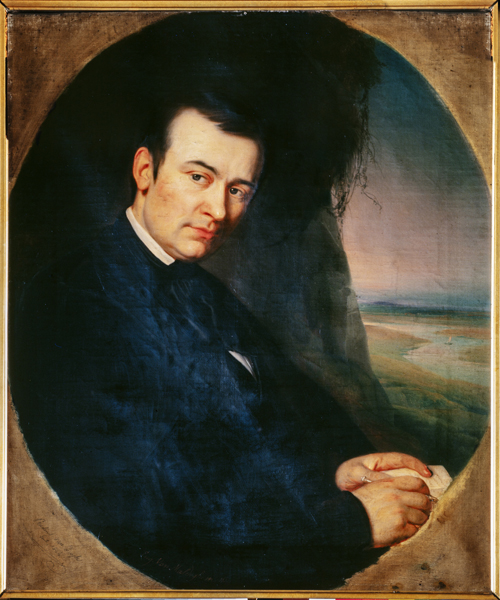
Prudens van Duyse

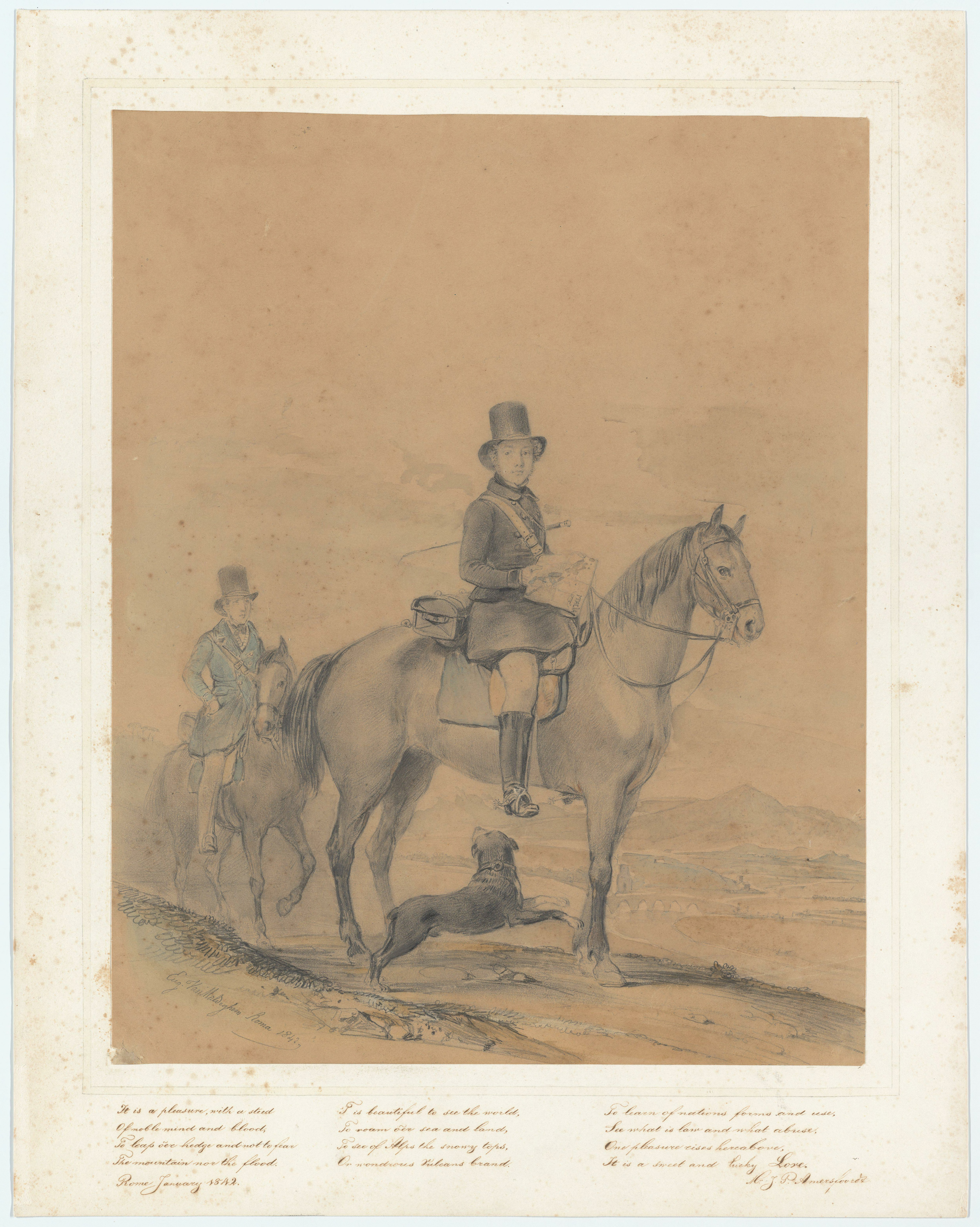
Two horsemen

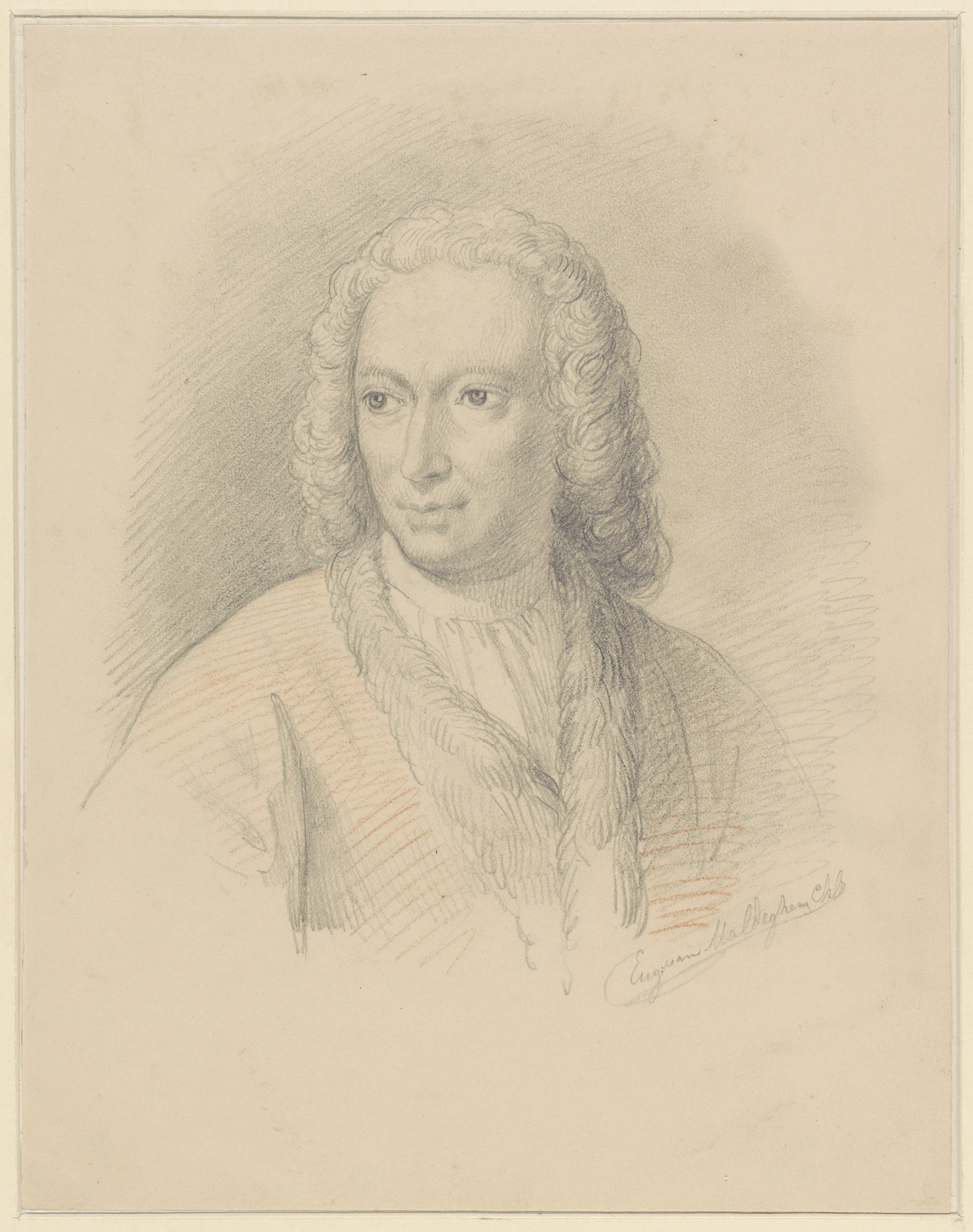
Meindert Hobbema

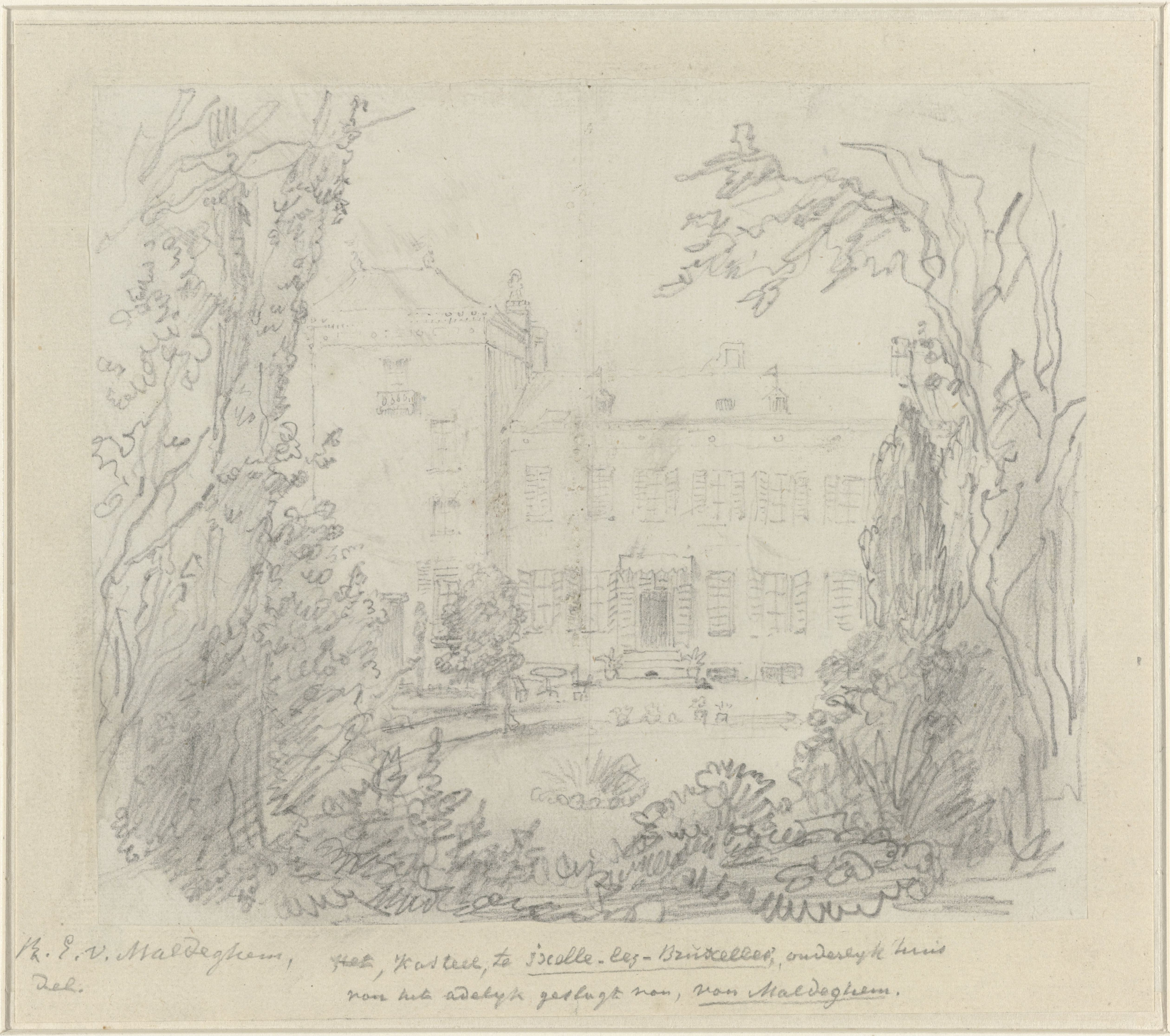
Castle Ixelles-les-Bruxelles

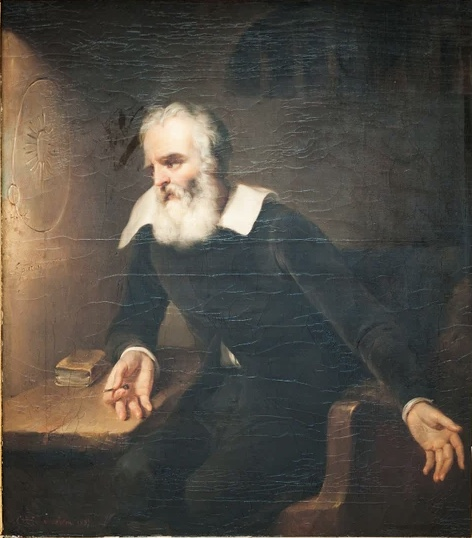
Galileo Galilei
