= Luuk Gruwez =

Flemish poet (born 1953)

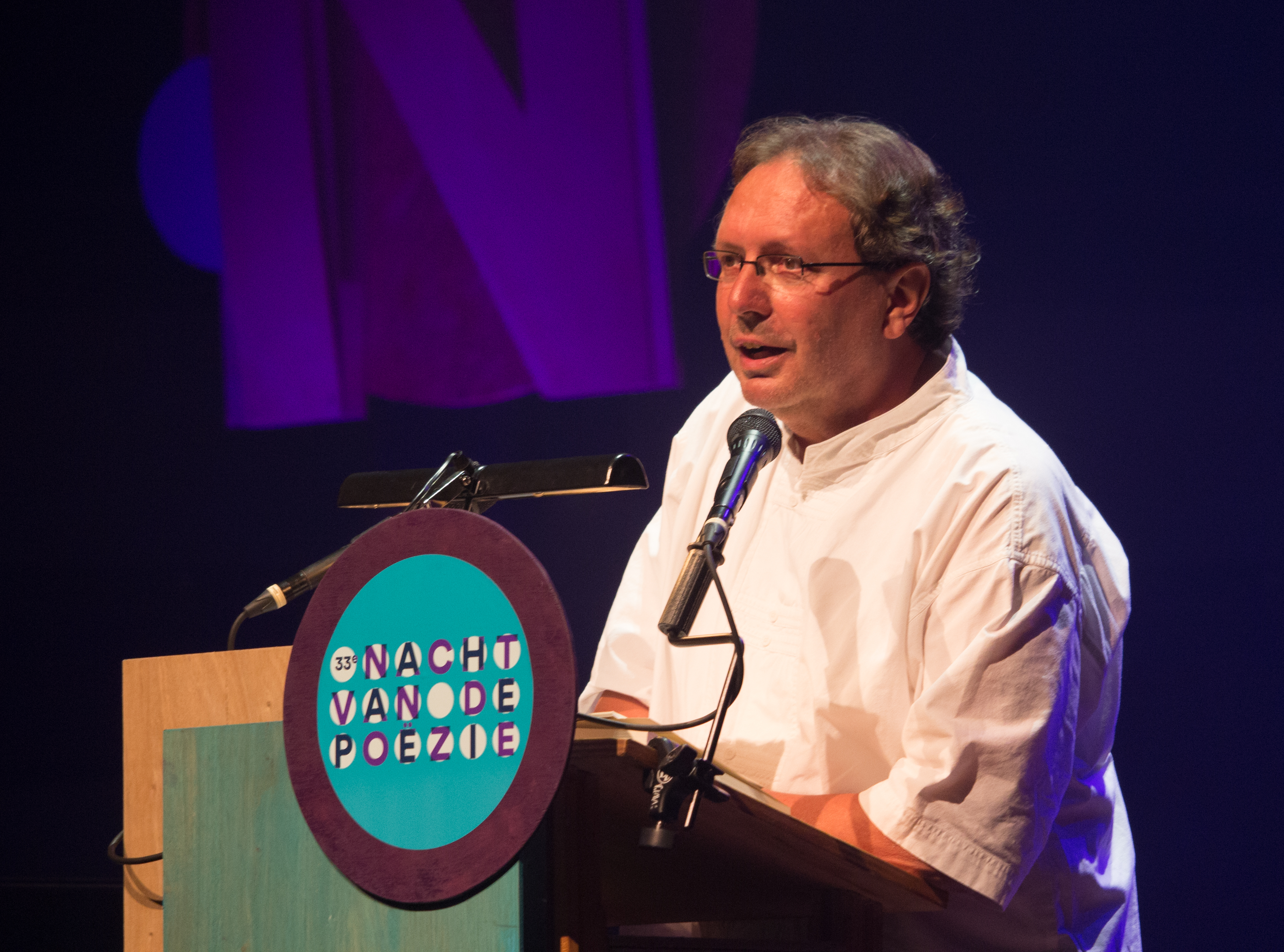
- Gruwez (2015)
- Born: 9 August 1953 (age 72); Kortrijk, Belgium
- Occupation: poet

Luuk Gruwez (born 9 August 1953) is a Flemish poet. Since 1976, he lives in Hasselt, where he worked until 1995 as a teacher.

Gruwez was born at Kortrijk. He attended high school there at the Damiaancollege and graduated in Germanic philology at the Katholieke Universiteit Leuven. In 1976 he moved from Kortrijk to Hasselt. He earned a living as a teacher there until his career break in 1995 after being granted a scholarship as a writer.

Gruwez' work is sometimes considered to belong to the neoromantic movement in response to the new realism of the 60s, with its typical emphasis on the emotions of life, love, disease, decay and death. But in Luuk Gruwez' work this kind of romance is always tempered by a portion of (self) irony.

In his later poetry the subject matter is broader and his style becomes more narrative. He is now a full-time writer of poetry and prose as well as columns, appearing weekly in De Standaard and monthly from 2001 to 2003 in De Morgen. In 1995 he received the Hugues C. Pernath-prijs. In 2009 he received the Herman de Coninckprijs for his poem "Moeders" from Lagerwal. Tuur Florizoone and Jessa Wildemeersch composed music for these nominated poems.

== Bibliography ==
- Stofzuigergedichten (1973)
- Ach, wat zacht geliefkoos om een mild verdriet (1977)
- Daar komen de Tachtigers al aan (1977)
- Een huis om dakloos in te zijn (1981)
- De feestelijke verliezer (1985)
- Dikke mensen (1990)
- Onder vier ogen (1992)
- Het bal van opa Bing (1994)
- Vuile manieren (1994)
- Bandeloze gedichten (1996)
- Het land van de wangen (1998)
- Slechte gedachten (1999)
- Dieven en geliefden (2000)
- De maand van Marie. Vier vrouwenvertellingen (2002)
- Een stenen moeder (2004)
- Allemansgek, incl. CD (2005)
- Psilo (2007), verhalen
- Lagerwal (2008), poëzie
- Garderobe (2010), bloemlezing uit zijn poëzie
- Cosas perdidas (2010), poëzie
- Krombeke Retour/ Deerlijk Retour (2011), verhalen.

== See also ==
- Flemish literature

== Sources ==
- Official website
- Luuk Gruwez
- Willem M. Roggeman, Luuk Gruwez In: Beroepsgeheim 6 (1992)
- G.J. van Bork en P.J. Verkruijsse, De Nederlandse en Vlaamse auteurs (1985)
