= Maldegem =

- Municipality
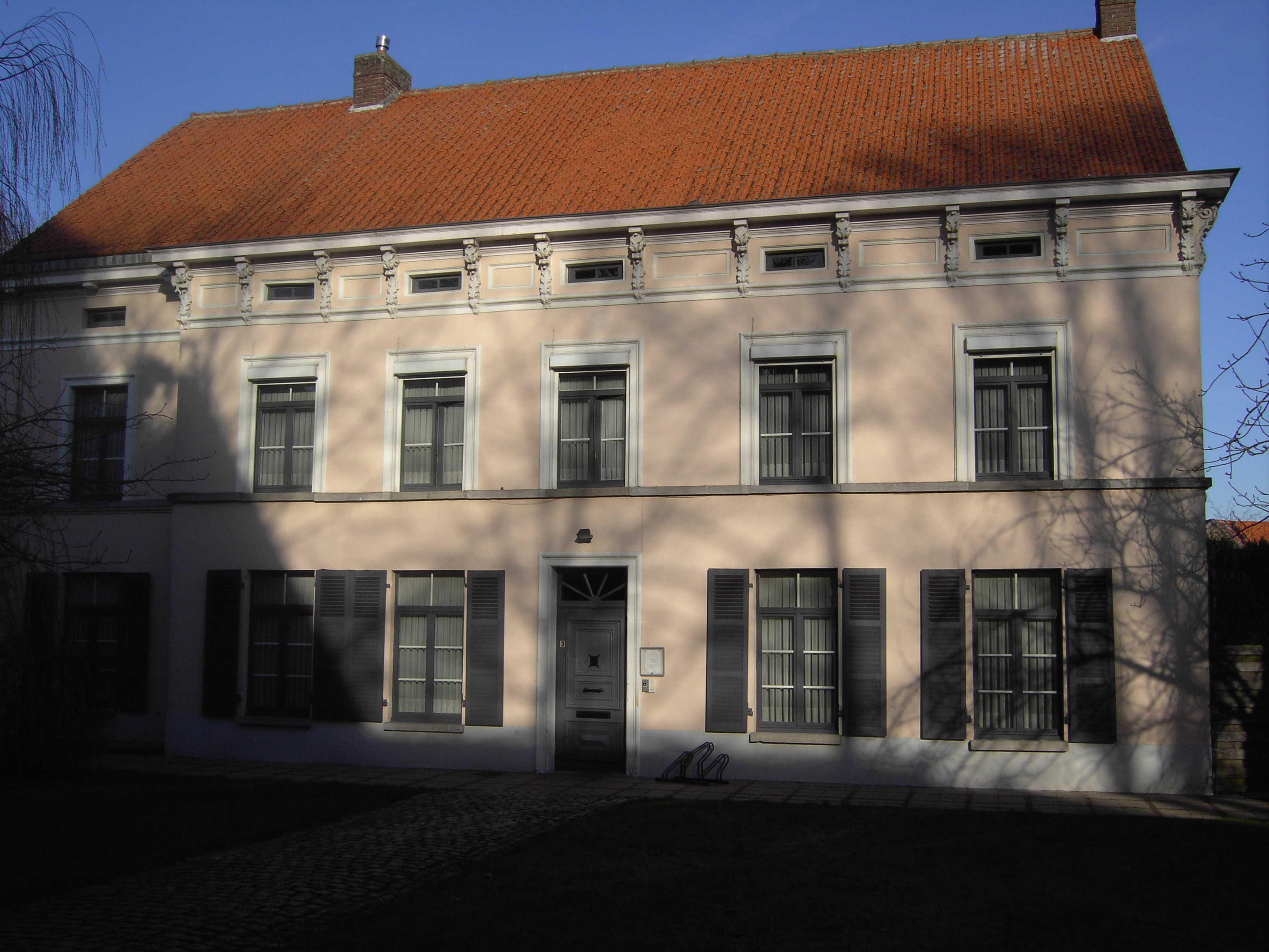
- Maldegem rectory

- Flag Coat of arms

- Location of Maldegem in East Flanders
- Interactive map of Maldegem
- Location in Belgium
- Coordinates: 51°12′N 03°26′E
- Country: Belgium
- Community: Flemish Community
- Region: Flemish Region
- Province: East Flanders
- Arrondissement: Eeklo

Government
  - Mayor: Ferre Roesbeke (CD&V)
  - Governing parties: CD&V, N-VA, Groen

Area
  - Total: 95.63 km^{2} (36.92 sq mi)

Population (2018-01-01)
  - Total: 23,689
  - Density: 247.7/km^{2} (641.6/sq mi)
- Postal codes: 9990–9992
- NIS code: 43010
- Area codes: 050
- Website: www.maldegem.be

Maldegem (Dutch pronunciation: [ˈmɑldəɣɛm]), earlier spelled Maldeghem, is a municipality located in the Belgian province of East Flanders. The municipality comprises the villages of Maldegem, Adegem and Middelburg. Kleit and Donk have always been separate hamlets of Maldegem. On 1 January 2018, Maldegem had a total population of 23,689. The total area is 94.64 square kilometres (36.54 sq mi) which gives a population density of 250 inhabitants per km^{2}.

The Stoomcentrum Maldegem is located at the former NMBS railway station at Maldegem.

== World War II airfield ==
An airfield established in 1939 near Maldegem was taken over by the invading German army in 1940 and used by the Luftwaffe. Seized by British Forces in September 1944, it was designated "Advanced Landing Ground B-65".

== Sport and events ==
Parkcross is an international cyclo-cross race that is held in Sint-Annapark in the center of Maldegem since 2007.

== Notable inhabitants ==
- Joanna Courtmans (1811–1890), writer

== International relations ==
=== Twin towns – Sister cities ===
Maldegem is twinned with the following towns:

- Adria, Italy
- Świdnica, Poland
- Ermont, France
- Wierden, Netherlands
- Lampertheim, Germany
