= Jotie T'Hooft =

Belgian poet (1956–1977)

Johan Geeraard Adriaan T'Hooft
- Born: 9 May 1956 Oudenaarde, Belgium
- Died: 6 October 1977 (aged 21) Bruges, Belgium
- Occupation: Poet
- Literary movement: Neo-romanticism

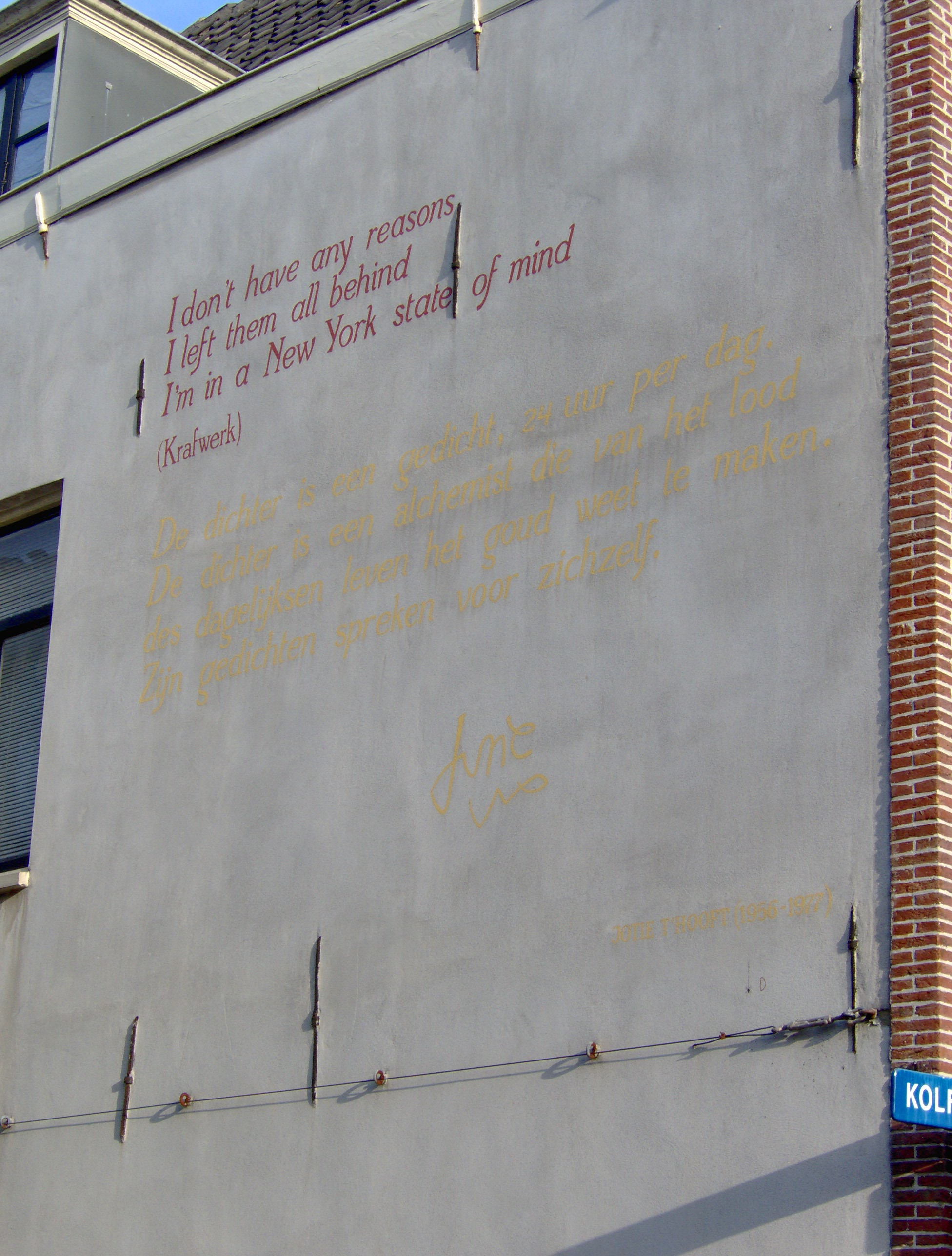
The poem De dichter is een gedicht written by T'Hooft on a wall at Leiden

Johan Geeraard Adriaan T'Hooft (9 May 1956 – 6 October 1977) was a Flemish Belgian neo-romantic poet. He is well known for his hippie/junkie lifestyle, death-related poetry and early death at age 21 from a drug-related suicide. These elements have made him a legend in his native country. His life and death by overdose were made into a movie, the English title Junkie's Sorrow.

== Life ==
Jotie T'Hooft was born in Oudenaarde, Belgium. He was an only child. During his younger years, he was an excellent student, but had difficulties adjusting to life as a secondary school student. He was expelled from several schools by the time he was 14. It is then that he sought safety in literature, especially the works of Franz Kafka and Hermann Hesse, and in drugs. He moved out at age 17 to study in Ghent. However, his drug habit prevented him from ever beginning his studies. In 1973 T'Hooft made his first suicide attempt. He married in 1974. His father-in-law, Julien Weverbergh, was head of publishing company Manteau who agreed to publish his works.

== Death ==
Despite his literary notability T'Hooft kept struggling with his drug problems. In 1977 he died from an overdose of cocaine. He had written a goodbye message to his wife on the wall and left his pick-up recorder playing The End by The Doors on repeat. T' Hooft was only 21 at the time.

== Works ==
The most recurring theme in his poetry is death, which obsessed him from a young age. This is perfectly characterized by a phrase from one of his poems: I am the world, in me the death flower has awoken unstoppably. According to his poetry, he sees himself as a stranger; the world is a foreign place to him.

T'Hooft also wrote various essays about his favorite rock artists, including The Doors, Frank Zappa and The Velvet Underground. In 1974 he and a friend also made an obscure comic strip, satirizing God and Jesus.

== Alter ego ==
Jotie used the alter ego Charles Louis Daenen and performed as this character during his earliest poetry recitals.

== See also ==
- Flemish literature
