= Jan Lambrecht Domien Sleeckx =

Flemish writer (1818–1901)

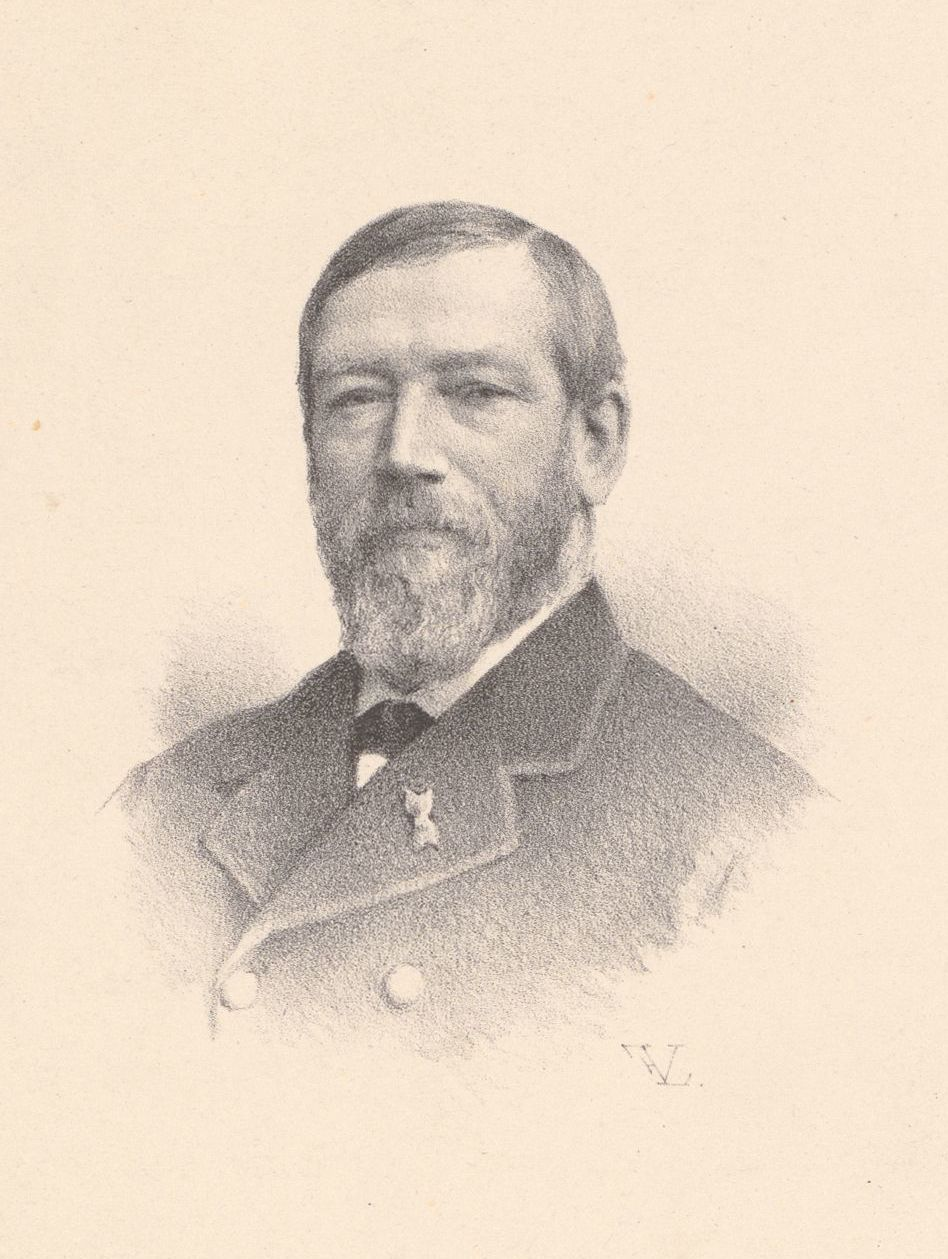
Jan Lambrecht Domien Sleeckx, by Florimond Van Loo

Jan Lambrecht Domien Sleeckx or Dominicus Jan Lambrecht (Antwerp, 2 February 1818 – Liège, 13 October 1901), was a Flemish writer. He started his career as a notary clerk and a journalist, in 1861 he became a teacher of Dutch in Lier and later head school inspector of primary schools.

He started his literary career with the romantic Kronyken der Straten van Antwerpen (3 volumes, 1843) but he turned himself against the idealizing style of Hendrik Conscience, and became a convinced proponent of a moderate realism, which he defended also theoretically (Over het realismus in de letterkunde, 1862). In 1844, he was one of the founders of the Vlaemsch Belgie, the first daily paper in the Flemish interest.

In his novels and theatre plays he sketched the selfishness of farmers and citizens or the adventures of captains and seamen. He wrote the novels Tybaerts en Cie (1867), De plannen van Peerjan (1868) and the theatre plays Jan Steen (1852), a comedy; Gretry, which gained a national prize in 1861, De vissers van Blankenberg (1870), and the patriotic drama of Zannekin (1865). His animal tales are considered to be his best work, such as Arabella Knox (1855), in which he introduced the English humor in Flanders and by their lively structure remained readable for a modern audience. Together with J.F. Vandevelde he published dictionaries.

== See also ==
- Flemish literature

== Sources ==
- F. van Veerdeghem, Levensschets van J.L.D.S. (1902)
- Jan Lambrecht Domien Sleeckx
