= Paul Claes =

Flemish scholar, writer, poet and translator (born 1943)

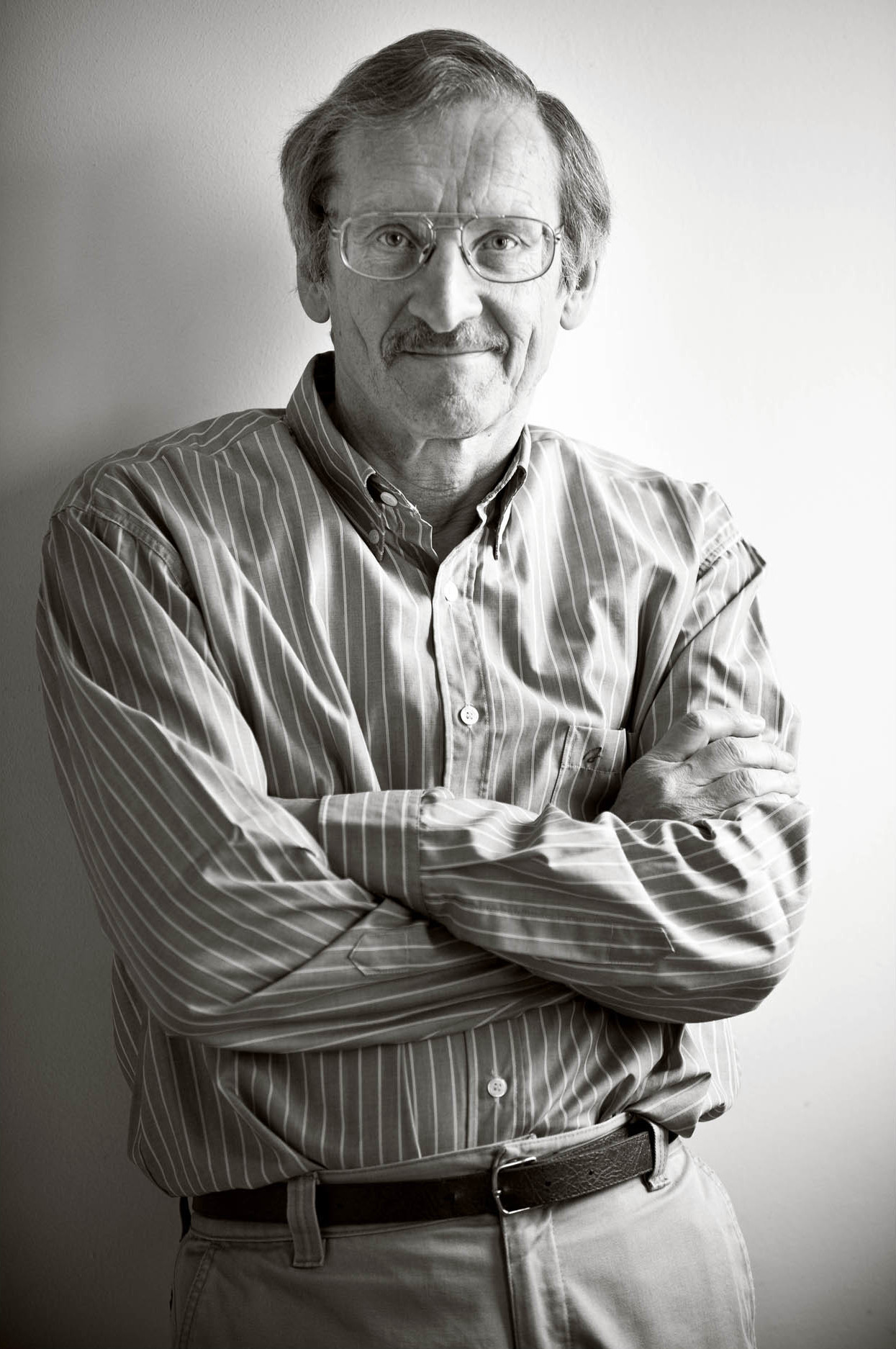
Claes (photo by Michiel Hendryckx)

Paul Claes (born 30 October 1943) is a Flemish scholar, writer, poet and translator.

== Biography ==
Born in Leuven, Claes graduated in classical literature and Germanic philology (Dutch and English). He obtained a PhD in 1981, with a dissertation De mot zit in de mythe on references to classical texts in the works of Hugo Claus. He worked at the Katholieke Universiteit Leuven and the Catholic University of Nijmegen.

He wrote the script for Reynaert de Vos (1973-1974), a satirical newspaper comic based on Reynard the Fox, drawn by hugOKÉ.

Claes made his debut as a poet in 1983 with sonnets in De zonen van de zon. His translation of T. S. Eliot's The Waste Land (2007) includes a comprehensive commentary and a new interpretation. La clef des Illuminations (2008) is a new interpretation of Arthur Rimbaud's masterpiece. Concatenatio Catulliana (2002) proposes a new theory about the arrangement of Catullus's Carmina. Several of satirical poems have appeared in Knack.

- Het netwerk en de nevelvlek (1979)
- De zonen van de zon (1983)
- Claus-reading (1984)
- De mot zit in de mythe (1984)
- Hans Favery. Een (de)constructie (1985)
- De Kwadratuur van de Onyx (1986)
- Claus quadrifrons (1987)
- Echo's echo's. De kunst van de allusie (1988)
- Rebis (1989)
- Het laatste boek (1992)
- De Sater (1993)
- Gezelle gelezen (1993 [i.e. 1992])
- Embleem (1994)
- Mimicry (1994)
- Raadsels van Rilke (1995)
- De zoon van de Panter (1996)
- De phoenix (1998)
- De gulden tak (2000)
- Glans (2000)
- De kameleon (2001)
- Het Hart van de Schorpioen (2002)
- De Lezer (2003)
- Lily (2003)
- Sfinx (2004)
- Psyche (2006)
- Plastic Love (2013)
- De haas en de regenboog (2016)
- Ouroboros (2023)

== Awards ==
- 1984 - Prijs voor de Kunstkritiek
- 1985 - Literaire Prijs van de stad Antwerpen
- 1991 - Driejaarlijkse Belgische Staatsprijs voor het essay
- 1996 - Martinus Nijhoff prijs
- 2002 - Multatuli Prize

== See also ==
- Flemish literature

== Sources ==
- Paul Claes (in Dutch)
- Paul Claes (in Dutch)
