= Felix Timmermans =

Flemish writer

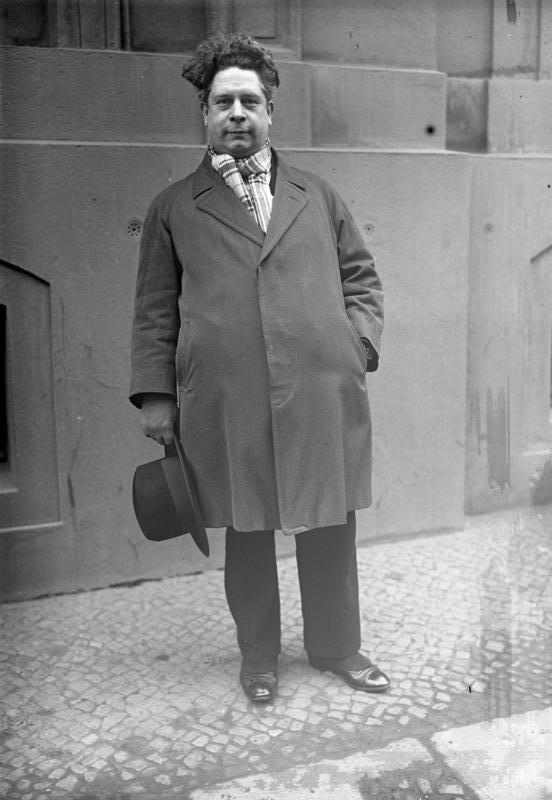
- Born: 5 July 1886; Lier
- Died: 24 January 1947 (aged 60)
- Writing career
- Pen name: Polleke van Mher
- Notable work: Pallieter

Leopold Maximiliaan Felix Timmermans (5 July 1886 – 24 January 1947) is a much translated author from Flanders. He was nominated for the Nobel Prize in Literature three times.

== Life ==
Timmermans was born in the Belgian city of Lier, as the thirteenth of fourteen children. He died in Lier at age 60. He was an autodidact, and wrote plays, historical novels, religious works, and poems. His best-known book is Pallieter (1916). Timmermans also wrote under the pen-name Polleke van Mher.

He was a painter and drawer as well as an author.

During the first years of the Second World War, Timmermans was editor of the Flemish nationalist Volk. He also attended meetings of the Europäische Schriftsteller-Vereinigung (European Writers' League), which was initiated by Joseph Goebbels. Because of this, and because of the Rembrandt prize he received in 1942 from the University of Hamburg, he was seen by many as a collaborator, which may have caused health problems and premature death.

== Bibliography ==
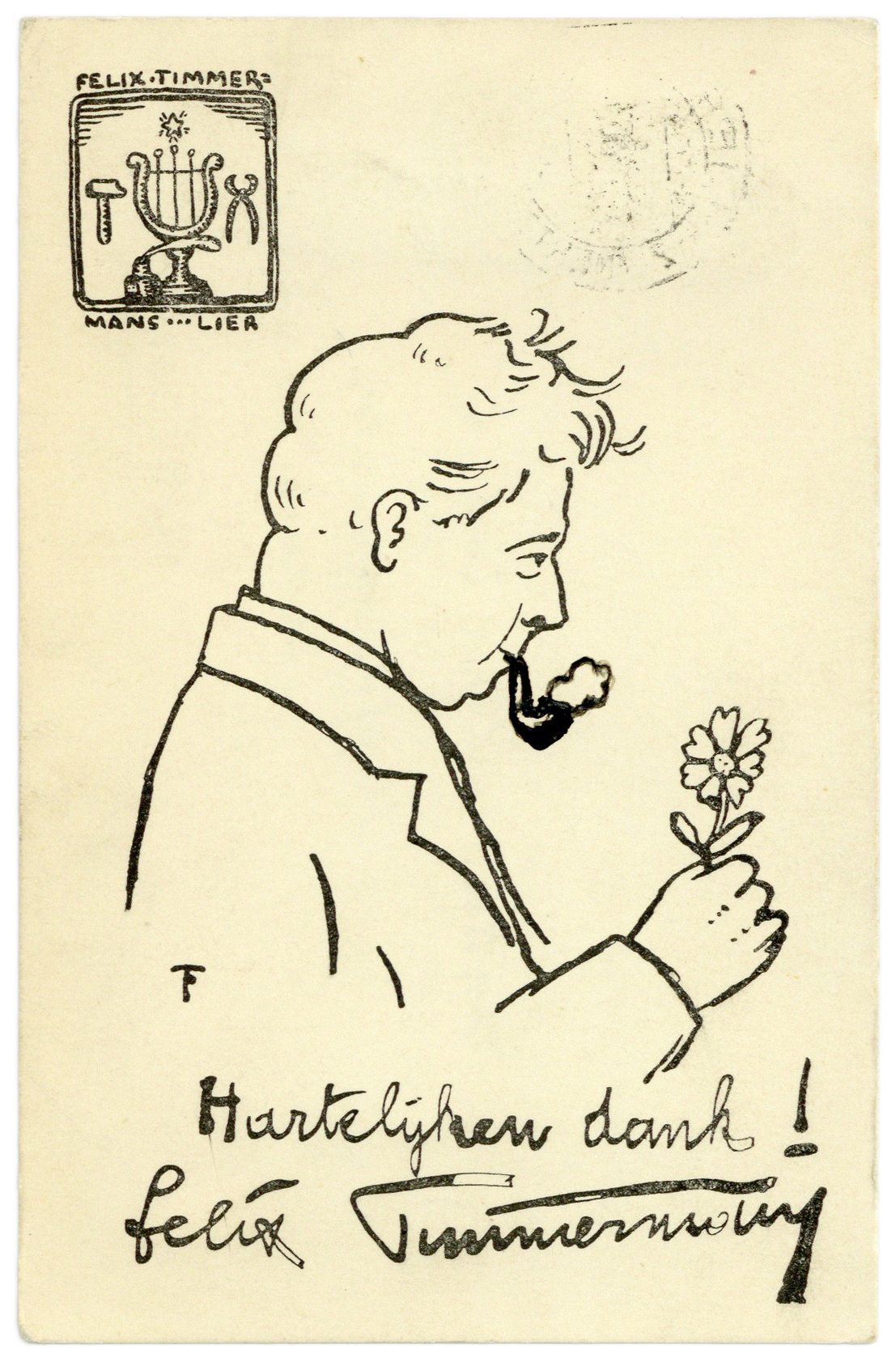
Self portrait, Felix Timmermans, drawing, Letterenhuis (Antwerpen)

- 1907: Door de dagen. Indrukken van Polleke van Mher (poems)
- 1909: "Ecce-Homo" en het bange portieresken (later opgenomen in "Begijnhofsproken")
- 1910: Schemeringen van de dood
- 1912: Begijnhofsproken (omvattend: Binnenleiding – De waterheiligen – De sacrificie van zuster Wivina – De aankondiging of de strijd tussen Elias en de Antikrist – "Ecce-Homo" en het bange portieresken – Van zuster Katelijne en 't Lievevrouwken – Het fonteintje – Buitenleiding)
- 1916: Pallieter
- 1917: Het kindeke Jezus in Vlaanderen
- 1918: De zeer schone uren van juffrouw Symforosa, begijntje
- 1919: Boudewijn (animal fable in verse)
- 1921: Anna-Marie
- 1921: Karel en Elegast (adaptation)
- 1922: De vier heemskinderen (adaptation)
- 1922: Uit mijn rommelkast. Rond het ontstaan van "Pallieter" en "Het kindeke Jezus in Vlaanderen"
- 1922: Mijnheer Pirroen (theatre play)
- 1923: Driekoningentriptiek
- 1923: De ivoren fluit (short stories)
- 1924: De pastoor uit den bloeyenden wijngaerdt
- 1924: Pieter Brugel. Speech given on 31 May 1924
- 1924: Het keerseken in den lanteern (omvattend: De nood van Sinter-Klaas – Het masker – Het nachtelijk uur – In de koninklijke vlaai – 't Nonneke Beatrijs – Het verbeternishuis – De eeuwige stilte – Het eerste communiekantje – Het verksken – De begrafenis van Matantje – De verliefde moor – Zomerkermissen – O. L. Vrouw der visschen – Landelijke processie – De kerstmis-sater – Sint-Gommarus – De kistprocessie – Ambiorix)
- 1924: En waar de sterre bleef stille staan (theatre play)
- 1924: Het kleuterboek. Rijmpjes
- 1925: Schoon Lier
- 1925: De oranjebloemekens (in Vierde Winterboek van de wereldbibliotheek)
- 1926: Naar waar de appelsienen groeien
- ?: In De Fortuin
- 1926: Het hovenierken Gods
- 1926: Leontientje (theatre play)
- 1928: Pieter Bruegel, zoo heb ik uit uwe werken geroken
- 1929: Het werk van Fred Bogaerts (introduction by Felix Timmermans)
- 1930: De hemelsche Salomé (toneelspel)
- 1931: De wilgen (In "De stad")
- 1932: De harp van Sint-Franciscus
- 1933: Pijp en toebak (omvattend: De lange steenen pijp – Rond een plaats van portier – Het konijn – Het geheim der wilgen – In 't Kruis, café chantant – Het liefdekabinet – De moedwillige verkenskop – De heilige kraai – De dinsdagsche heilige – Het gehiem – De oranjebloemekens – Mademoiselle de Chanterie – Twee vertellingen voor mijne kinderen: De uil, Het zegevierend haasje)
- 1934: De kerk van Strijthem (In Kerstboek 1934)
- 1934: Bij de krabbekoker
- 1935: Boerenpsalm
- 1936: Het Vlaamsche volksleven volgens Pieter Breughel
- 1937: Het jaar des heeren (Karl Heinrich Waggerl – translated from German)
- 1938: Het kindeke Jezus in Vlaanderen (adapted to theatre by Karl Jacobs)
- 1938: Het filmspel van Sint-Franciscus (theatre play)
- 1941: De familie Hernat
- 1942: Vertelsels (heruitgegeven in 1986) (comprises: De goede helpers, Perlamoena, De juwelendiefstal, De uil, Prinses Orianda en het damhert, Jef soldaat, Sint-Nicolaas en de drie kinderen, De dag der dieren, Anne-Mie en Bruintje, Het visserke op de telloor, Onze-Lieve-Heer en de koei, De bende van de Onzichtbare Hand, Het verken als kluizenaar, Pitje Sprot, De nood van Sinterklaas, Het zegevierend haasje, Het verkske, Jan de kraai)
- 1942: Kindertijd (story in Bloei)
- 1943: Die sanfte Kehle (theatre play, original title: De zachte keel) (republished in 2006 by the Felix-Timmermans Kring)
- 1943: Minneke-Poes
- 1943: Oscar Van Rompay (essay)
- 1943: Isidoor Opsomer
- 1943: Pieter Bruegel (theatre play)
- 1943: Een lepel herinneringen
- 1944: Vertelsels II
- 1944: Anne-Mie en Bruintje
- 1945: Vertelsels III
- 1947: Adagio (poems)
- 1948: Adriaan Brouwer
- xxxx: Lierke-Plezierke
- 1965: Brevarium (omvattend: De zeer schone uren van juffrouw Symforosa, begijntjen – Driekoningentryptiek – Het hovenierken Gods – Ik zag Cecilia komen – Minneke Poes)
- xxxx: Felix Timmermans verhaalt (comprising: Mijn rommelkas – Het verksken – Ik zag Cecilia komen – In de koninklijke vlaai – De bombardon – O. L. Vrouw der vissen – De kerstmis-sater – De uil – De moedwillige varkenskop – De lange steenen pijp – De nood van Sinter-Klaas)
- xxxx: De goede helpers en andere verhalen (omvattend: De goede helpers – Het verken als kluizenaar – Perlamoena – De juwelendiefstal – Het verksken – Prinses Orianda en het damhert – Jef Soldaat – De bende van de onzichtbare hand – Jan de Kraai – De nood van Sinter-Klaas – Sint-Nikolaas en de drie kinderen – Pitje Sprot – Het visserke op de telloor – Het zegevierende haasje – Onze Lieve Heer en de koei)
- 1969: Jan de Kraai en andere verhalen (comprising: Jan de Kraai – Onze Lieve Heer en de koei – De nood van Sinter-Klaas – In de koninklijke vlaai – Het verbeternishuis – Het verksken – Ambiorix – In 't Kruis, café-chantant – De kistprocessie)
- 1971: Met Felix Timmermans door Vlaanderen (comprising: Voorwoord door Lia Timmermans – Pallieter – De zeer schone uren van Juffrouw Symforosa, begijntjen – Pieter Bruegel, zo heb ik U uit Uw werken geroken – Boerenpsalm – Ik zag Cecilia komen – De pastoor uit den bloeyenden wijngaerdt)
- 1993: Pallieter in Holland – Uit mijn rommelkas – Een lepel herinneringen

== See also ==
- Flemish literature

== Sources ==
- Felix Timmermans (in Dutch)
