= Frans Rens =

Flemish writer

Frans Rens (Geraardsbergen, 2 February 1805 – Ghent, 19 December 1874) was a Flemish writer.

From 1823 up to 1843, he was an inspector of gold and silver work at Ghent, and head of lower education for the school area Lokeren.

== Bibliography ==
- Boudewijn de IJzeren (1837)
- Gedichten (1839)
- Bladeren uit den vreemde (1855)

== See also ==
- Flemish literature

== Sources ==
- G.J. van Bork en P.J. Verkruijsse, De Nederlandse en Vlaamse auteurs (1985)
- Frans Rens
- Frans Rens biography
