= Prudens van Duyse =

Flemish writer (1804–1859)

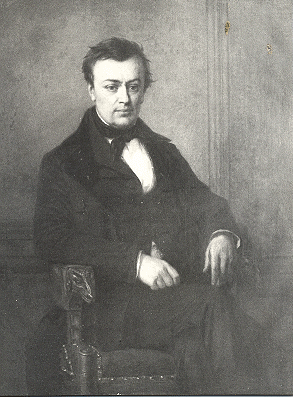
Prudens van Duyse

Prudentius van Duyse or Prudens van Duyse (Dendermonde, 17 September 1804 – Ghent, 13 November 1859) was a Flemish writer. He started his career a clerk of a notary, but afterwards studied law at the University of Ghent, where he graduated in 1832. In 1836, he became the archivist of the city of Ghent. He was a co-founder of the organization De tael is gansch het volk (E: language is the entire people) and was one of the pioneers of the Flemish movement. At the beginning of his literary career, he wrote so-called national poetry, but his actual debut was with the poem Lofdicht op de Nederlandsche taal, which he wrote in 1829. He published his best poems in Het klaverblad (1848) and in Nazomer (1859).

== Bibliography ==
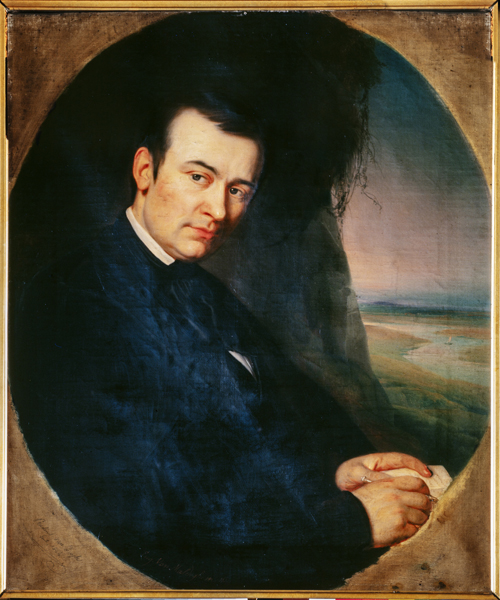
Prudens Van Duyse by Eugene van Maldeghem

- Dichtstuk over den heldenmoed der Vlamingen tegen de Fransschen betoond onder het bestuur van den graaf Guy van Dampière (1825)
- Griekenland, lierzang. Waterloo, kantate (1826)
- Lofdicht op de Nederlandsche tael (1829)
- De wanorde en omwenteling op den Vlaemschen zangberg (1830)
- Gedichten (1831)
- De Gentsche waterbeul (1839)
- Vaderlandsche poëzy (1840)
- Anton Van Dyck, of De reis naar Italië (1841)
- De spellingsoorlog (1842)
- Godfried, of De godsdienst op het veld (1842)
- Natalia (1842)
- De zang van den Germaanschen slaaf (1848)
- Het klaverblad. Romancen, legenden, sagen (1848)
- Gedichtjes voor kinderen (1849)
- Nieuwe kindergedichten (1849)
- Verhandeling over den Nederlandschen dichtbouw (1854, 2 volumes)
- Jacob Van Artevelde (1859)
- Nagelaten gedichten (1882–1885)
- Bloemlezing uit zijn dichtwerk (1942)

== See also ==
- Flemish literature

== Sources ==
- van Duyse (Dutch)
- Prudens van Duyse (Dutch)
