= Rhyming Chronicle of Worringen =

The Rhyming Chronicle of Worringen (Dutch: Rijmkroniek van Woeringen), also known as Rhyming Chronicle about the Battle of Worringen (Dutch: Rijmkroniek over de slag bij Woeringen; German: Reimchronik der Schlacht von Worringen) and by other names, (Note: Yeeste van den slag van Woeronc or Yeeste van den slag van Woeringen, "Deed(s) of the Battle of Worringen".) is a rhyming chronicle and chanson de geste-type chivalric romance on the reign of John I, Duke of Brabant up to and including the Battle of Worringen (1261–1288). The authorship of the chronicle has been attributed to a certain Jan van Heelu or Jan van Leeuwe.

== Authorship ==
Jan van Heelu (lived 13th century) was a Brabantine writer. Between 1288 and 1294, he wrote a chronicle of the Battle of Worringen of 5 June 1288, between Reinoud I of Guelders, and John I, Duke of Brabant. Although he claims to have been an eyewitness to the events he narrates, some scholars have rejected this assertion. Belgian historian Piet Avonds (1988) noted that it is a common feature of chivalric romance, including this rhyming chronicle, for the author to unreliably claim to have been a personal witness of the events he wrote down.

== Contents ==
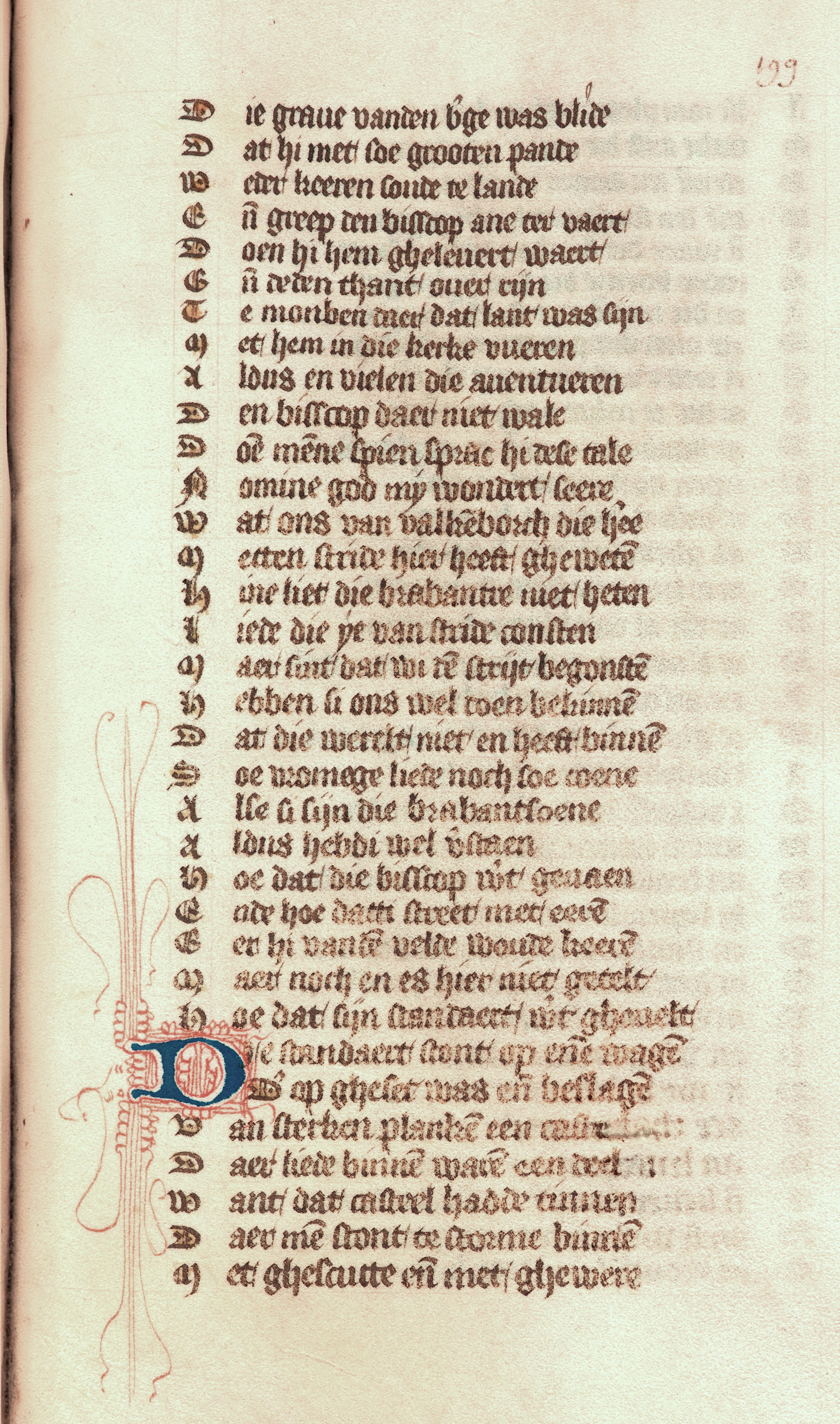
Manuscript KB 76 E 23 - fol 100r of the Rhyming Chronicle of Worringen.

The Rhyming Chronicle of Worringen consists of two parts, for a total of 8948 verses. It contains a history of the Duchy of Brabant between 1261 and 1288, which ends with acts of Duke John I of Brabant at the Battle of Woeringen that took place on 5 June 1288. After a description of the battle itself, the feats of arms of the Brabant knights, in order of their supposed dignity, are recounted separately. In doing so, Avonds (1988) noted that concerning the noble Wezemaal family, the last section is exceptionally extensive, and many heroic deeds are attributed to the Wezemaals, compared to other families. Avonds found this a likely indication that the Wezemaals commissioned the writing of the Rhyming Chronicle.

Preceding the chronicle is a preface of 592 verses, added later, presumably by a copyist.

== Manuscripts and editions ==
The following manuscripts of the Rhyming Chronicle have survived: (Note: For an extensive provenance, see J. Deschamps 1972.)

- Berlin, Berlin State Library – Stiftung Preußischer Kulturbesitz, germ., fol. 628.
- Brussels, Royal Library of Belgium, 6003–6005.
- Brussels, Royal Library of Belgium, IV 593.
- The Hague, Royal Library of the Netherlands, 130 G 24.
- The Hague, Royal Library of the Netherlands, 76 E 23. This manuscript dates from around 1440, and is the oldest and most important surviving copy of the Rhyming Chronicle, from which all other manuscripts are said to have been derived. It was recorded in Brussels by one Henricus van Damme by order of the city of Brussels.

== Bibliography ==
- "Jan van Heelu, Jan van Leeuwe – Narrative Sources". narrative-sources.be. 24 June 2011.
- Avonds, Piet (1988). "Van Keulen naar Straatsburg. Jan van Heelu's rijmkroniek over de slag bij Woeringen (1288)". Literatuur: tijdschrift over Nederlandse letterkunde (in Dutch). 5 (1): 196–204.
- Deschamps, Jan (1972). "32. Jan van Heelu, Rijmkroniek". Middelnederlandse handschriften uit Europese en Amerikaanse bibliotheken. Tweede herziene druk (in Dutch). Leiden: E.J. Brill. pp. 106–107. ISBN 90 04 03426 9. Archived from the original on 29 March 2009.
- "Jan van Heelu". Encarta Encyclopedie Winkler Prins (in Dutch). Microsoft Corporation/Het Spectrum. 2002.
- Goossens, Jan (1989). "De geografie van de Limburgse successieoorlog bij Jan van Heelu". Mededelingen van de Vereniging voor Limburgse Dialect- en Naamkunde (in Dutch) (52): 1–12.
- Kölnischer Geschichtsverein (1979). Jahrbuch der Kölnischer Geschichtsverein (in German). Verlag der Löwe.
- Sleiderink, Remco (1994). "Hertog Jan leeft". Madoc (in Dutch). 8 (1): 252–254.
- Willems, Jan Frans (1836). Rymkronyk van Jan van Heelu betreffende den slag van Woeringen van het jaer 1288 (in French). Brussel: M. Hayez. p. 588. (editio princeps)
