= St. Gummarus =

St. Gummarus could be

- Gummarus, the patron saint of lumberjacks, forest workers, foresters, woodcutters and Lier, Belgium
- St. Gummarus (beer) - the Belgian beer also called Sint-Gummarus brewed by the microbrewery "Sint Jozef"
- St. Gummarus Church, the gothic architecture structure in Lier
