= François-Joseph Scohy =

François-Joseph Scohy (1831–1881) was a Belgian military physician and archaeologist.

== Life ==
Scohy was born in Gilly, Belgium, on 26 September 1831. He studied medicine and natural science at the Catholic University of Louvain, graduating doctor in both. In 1852 he joined the army, continuing his studies while working as a military medic. In February 1860, while he was garrisoned at Lier, canalisation works dug up bones of enormous size. Scohy identified these as the bones of a mammoth and ensured their preservation. The Lier mammoth was mounted and in 1869 went on display in the Museum of Natural Sciences in Brussels.

Scohy died in Lillois (now part of Braine-l'Alleud) on 27 July 1881.

== Works ==
- "Sur les ossements fossiles découverts à Lierre le 28 février 1860", Bulletins de l'Académie Royale de Belgique, 2nd series, vol. 9, no. 5 (1860), pp. 436–455
- Introduction à l'histoire générale de la médecine (Brussels, 1867)
