= Amphidromus monsecourorum =

Scientific classification
- Kingdom: Animalia
- Phylum: Mollusca
- Class: Gastropoda
- Order: Stylommatophora
- Family: Camaenidae
- Genus: Amphidromus
- Species: A. monsecourorum

Binomial name
- Amphidromus monsecourorum Thach & F. Huber, 2017

Species of tree snail

Amphidromus monsecourorum is a species of air-breathing tree snail, an arboreal gastropod mollusk in the family Camaenidae.

The holotype is deposited at the Royal Belgian Institute of Natural Sciences.

== Distribution ==
This species is endemic to Laos
