= Bernard du Bus de Gisignies =

Dutch nobleman, scientist, and politician (1808–1874)

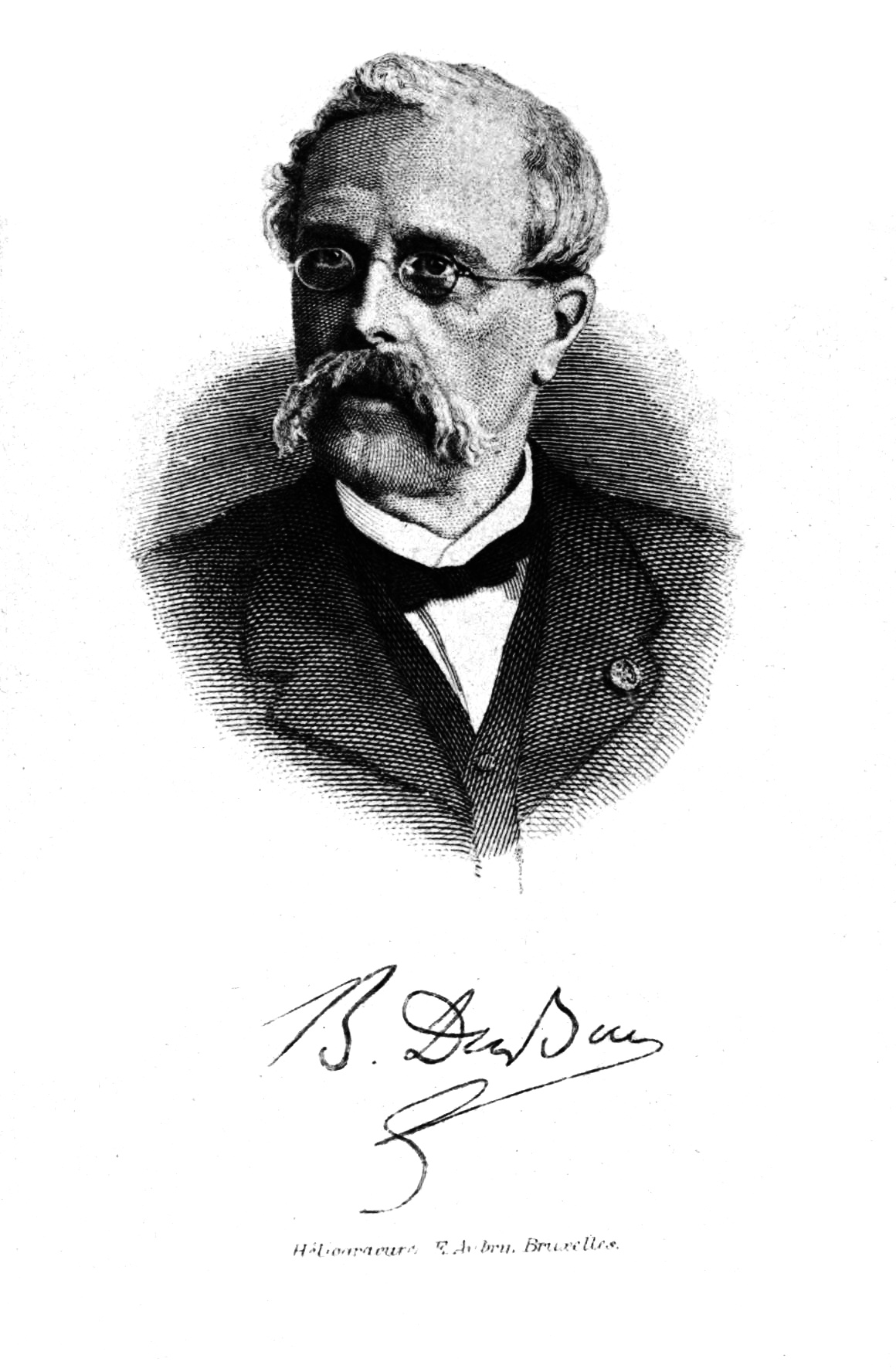
Bernard du Bus de Gisignies

Jonkheer Bernard Aimé Léonard du Bus de Gisignies (21 June 1808 in Saint-Josse-ten-Noode – 6 July 1874 in Bad Ems) was a Dutch nobleman and later on a Belgian politician. He was a collector of arts, books, an ornithologist and paleontologist.

== Biography ==
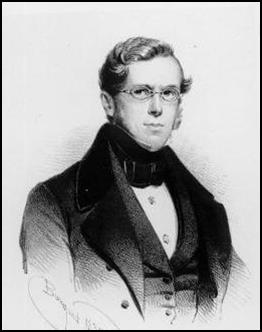
In younger life

De Gisignies was born in Tournai the second son of Leonard Pierre Joseph du Bus de Gisignies. He studied law at the State University of Louvain, but soon became more interested in ornithology. In 1835 he presented a manuscript to the Royal Academy of Belgium in which described the bird Leptorhynchus pectoralis (the banded stilt). He became a member of parliament for Soignies in 1835 and senator for Diksmuide from 1867 to 1874.

De Gisignies became the first director of the Royal Belgian Institute of Natural Sciences in 1846. On this occasion he donated 2474 birds from his own collection to the museum. In 1860, during the construction of new fortifications around Antwerp he became involved in paleontology. The fossils found were mainly of whales. He also obtained skeletons of a bowhead whale (Balaena mysticetus) and a young blue whale (Balaenoptera musculus), which are still on display in the museum. In 1860 the skeleton of a mammoth was found near Lier and brought to the museum (on display since 1869). At that time the only other skeleton of a mammoth on display was in the museum of Saint Petersburg (Russia). He described several species of bird including Crithagra canicapilla, Peucedramus taeniatus, Discosura popelairii, and Spinus xanthogastrus.

In 1867 he became the director of the science section of the Royal Academy of Belgium. He was a collector of fine arts and book. He had 94 works by Flemish and Dutch artists from the 17th century. Many of these were acquired by the museum of fine arts of Belgium after his death.

He married Petronilla Truyts on 19 May 1845 at in Sint-Joost-ten-Node, together they had two children; Viscount Bernard Daniel (Saint-Josse-ten-Noode, 7 October 1832 - Brussels, 17 February 1917) and Viscount Chretien (Saint-Josse-ten-Noode, 4 November 1845 - Jabbeke, 3 July 1883). The marriage was objected to by his father as Petronilla did not come from nobility and he refused to attend the wedding ceremony. De Gisignies died at Ems and was embalmed and buried at Oostmalle.

== Sources ==
- Bernard du Bus de Gisignies (Dutch)
- Heemkundige Kring van Malle (Ed.), Camera Obscura op Oost- en Westmalle, 1980
- Bart De Prins (Ed.), Leonard du Bus de Gisignies, Heemkundige Kring van Malle, 1999
