= Vesubia jugorum =

Conservation status
- Endangered (IUCN 3.1)

Scientific classification
- Kingdom: Animalia
- Phylum: Arthropoda
- Subphylum: Chelicerata
- Class: Arachnida
- Order: Araneae
- Infraorder: Araneomorphae
- Family: Lycosidae
- Genus: Vesubia
- Species: V. jugorum

Binomial name
- Vesubia jugorum Simon, 1881

Species of wolf spider

Vesubia jugorum, the alpine wolf spider or giant alpine spider, is an endangered species of wolf spider endemic to the Maritime Alps.

Vesubia jugorum was first described in 1881 by Eugène Simon at high altitudes in southeastern France. Today, it is found in rocky alpine regions of the Maritime Alps at elevations above 2,000m.

== Description ==
Adult alpine wolf spiders are dark colored and measure 15-20mm in length. The cephalothorax is 7-9mm in length and dark brown /black with dark stripes. The dorsal side of the abdomen is described as dark gray with a median stripe, while the ventral side is described as reddish brown. Legs are dorsally dark brown and ventrally red/yellowish, particularly on the coxae, and possess "robust spines."

== Life history ==
Alpine wolf spiders have a multi-annual life cycle with a lifespan of 4 years. The growing season lasts 5-6 months during the warmest months and adulthood is reached after 10-12 instars depending on sex. Males reach adulthood at the 10th instar and females at the 11th or 12th. The mating season is thought to occur during July and August, as this is when they are the most active. After mating, males will die, and females will overwinter one more time and then die the next year. During the overwintering period, which lasts 6-7 months, females store sperm in their receptacula and then lay their eggs when temperatures increase.

Females construct cocoons the same way other wolf spiders do, creating a white globular sac containing an average of 200 eggs. Females usually produce only one egg sac, but some captive-raised specimens have produced 2. Like many wolf spiders, the female alpine wolf spider shows maternal care to her offspring. When the cocoon must be moved, it is attached to the spinnerets and carried beneath the abdomen to keep it safe. Studies have shown that when their egg sac is lost or removed, the female will look for it until it or a suitable replacement is found.

After the eggs are laid and the cocoon is formed, the female will take care of the cocoon for around one month until the offspring hatch. When they hatch, the juveniles emerge through a cleft in the seam of the cocoon and then climb onto their mother's opisthoma, where she will carry them for 7-10 days until the spiderlings disperse. Shortly after dispersal, the juveniles will molt to the third instar. Early stages of the alpine wolf spider have smaller gaps between instars, starting every two weeks, but the average length of time is 40 days.

== Habitat and range ==
Giant alpine spiders live in nival and subnivean alpine rocky areas above 2,000m, such as rocky debris, boulder fields, and alpine screes. Remaining suitable habitat for the alpine wolf spider is decreasing due to climate change, but its current known distribution range is roughly 2500km^{2} centered over the Maritime Alps.

Females build circular and silk-lined retreat under stones, with a small opening in the silken walls, occasionally digging an additional small recess into the soil.

== Ecology ==
=== Diet ===
Alpine wolf spiders are cursorial hunters who approach prey and pounce on it from a close distance. The prey is grabbed and kept in place by the alpine wolf spider's strong, spined legs until the prey is bitten by the chelicerae and released. They efficiently maximize nutrient consumption and energy extraction from their prey by masticating it with their chelicerae. Alpine wolf spiders exhibit generalist habits likely due to the limited resources available in the habitat.

They have been observed preying on organisms in the orders Orthoptera, Diptera, Lepidoptera, Coleoptera, Isopoda, Oniscidea and Araneae. Cannibalism is also a common occurrence, usually between specimens with large size differences.

=== Behavior ===
- Alpine wolf spiders have been frequently observed taking shelter under stones, travelling over rocks, and lingering in prairies at the edge of alpine screes.
- Females do not seem to be territorial about their cocoons; up to three females have been found in adjoining retreats under the same stone.
- Females and juveniles can be seen during the whole warm season, when the snow melts in mid-June to late September. Males are only found from July-August.

== Conservation ==
The alpine wolf spider was officially declared Endangered by the IUCN Redlist in 2018.

=== Threats ===
Climate change, and the increasing temperatures that come with it, threaten the amount of suitable habitat available for the alpine wolf spider. High altitude regions are particularly sensitive to the effects of climate change, experiencing warming rates at about double the global average.

=== Efforts ===
The CRYPTERS project is a research project funded by the Royal Belgian Institute of Natural Sciences focused on documenting diversity of Alpine spiders, particularly Vesubia jugorum. Information gained by this research will help contribute to future conservation efforts of the Alpine wolf spider.
