= Vesubia =

Scientific classification
- Kingdom: Animalia
- Phylum: Arthropoda
- Subphylum: Chelicerata
- Class: Arachnida
- Order: Araneae
- Infraorder: Araneomorphae
- Family: Lycosidae
- Genus: Vesubia; Simon

Species
- Vesubia caduca (Karsch, 1880) - Polynesia; Vesubia jugorum (Simon, 1881) - Italy; Vesubia vivax (Thorell, 1875) - Russia, Turkmenistan

Genus of spiders

Vesubia is a genus of spiders in the family Lycosidae. It was first described in 1910 by Simon. As of 2017, it contains 3 species.
