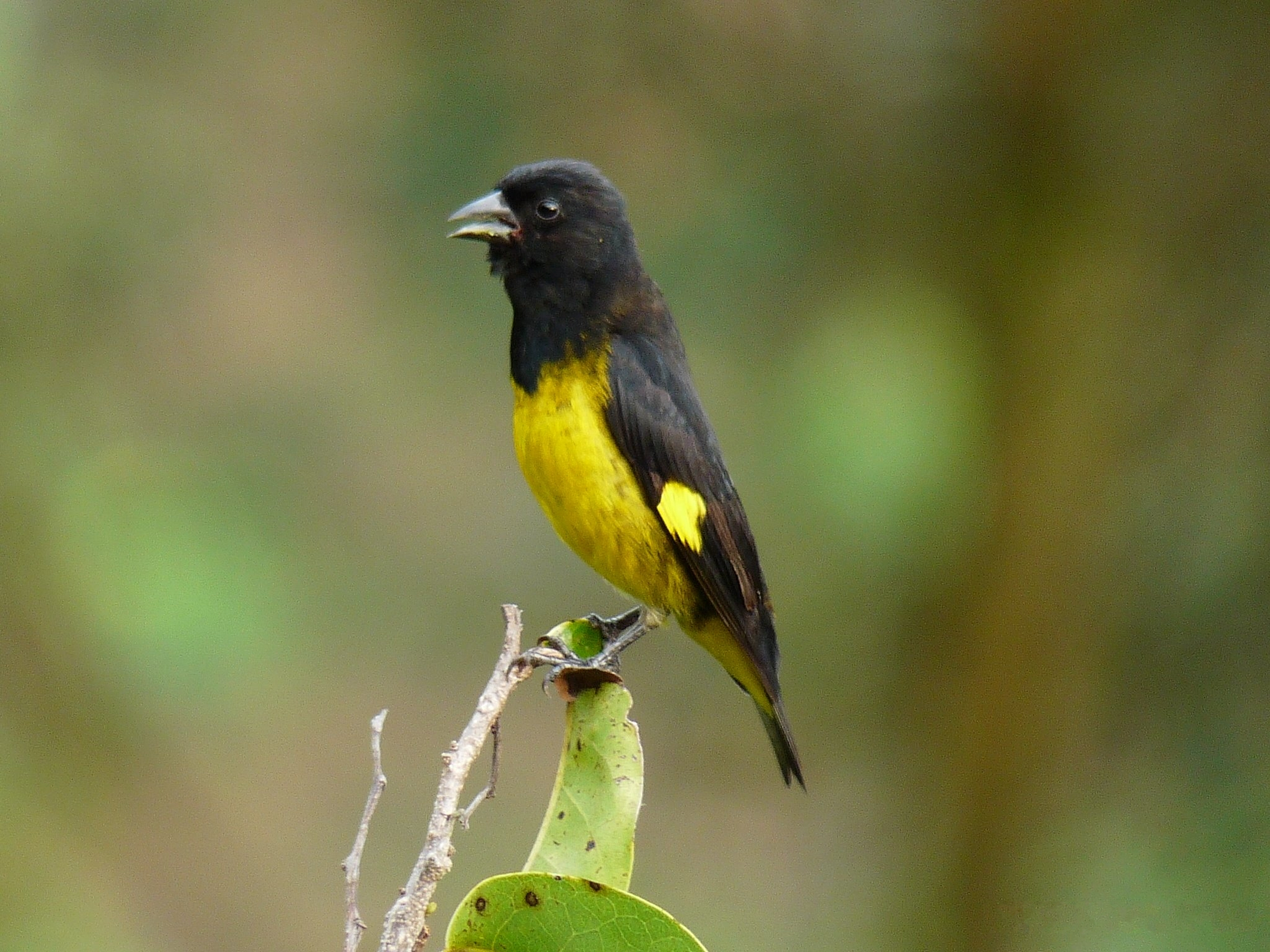
- Male S. x. xanthogastrus in Colombia

Conservation status
- Least Concern (IUCN 3.1)

Scientific classification
- Kingdom: Animalia
- Phylum: Chordata
- Class: Aves
- Order: Passeriformes
- Family: Fringillidae
- Subfamily: Carduelinae
- Genus: Spinus
- Species: S. xanthogastrus

Binomial name
- Spinus xanthogastrus (Du Bus de Gisignies, 1855)

Synonyms
- See text

= Yellow-bellied siskin =

Species of bird

The yellow-bellied siskin (Spinus xanthogastrus) is a small passerine bird in the family Fringillidae, the finches and euphonias. It is found from Costa Rica south to Bolivia.

== Taxonomy and systematics ==
The yellow-bellied siskin has a complicated taxonomic history. It was originally described in 1855 with the binomial Chrysomitris xanthogastra. It was later moved to what was then the subgenus Spinus within genus Carduelis and also spent time in genus Sporagra. Beginning in about 2009 the subgenus was elevated to full genus level and the yellow-bellied siskin, the rest of the New World siskins, and the New World goldfinches were therefore elevated to now-genus Spinus.

The yellow-bellied siskin has two subspecies, the nominate S. x. xanthogastrus (Du Bus de Gisignies, 1855) and S. x. stejnegeri (Sharpe, 1888).

== Description ==
The yellow-bellied siskin is 10 to 11.5 cm (3.9 to 4.5 in) long and weighs about 11 to 14 g (0.39 to 0.49 oz). The species is sexually dimorphic. Adult males of the nominate subspecies have a glossy black head, chin, breast, and upperparts. Their tail is mostly glossy black with yellow bases to the outer feathers. Their wings are mostly glossy black with bright yellow bases on the primaries and secondaries. Their lower breast, belly, and undertail coverts are bright yellow with an olive tinge on the flanks. Adult females have a mostly dull olive-green head with a paler supercilium with a slightly dusky stripe through the eye and around the back of the ear coverts. Their back is dull olive-green with thin darker streaks and their rump and uppertail coverts are a paler green. Their tail is mostly blackish brown with wide olive or yellowish bases on all but the innermost pair of feathers. Their upperwing coverts are blackish with pale yellow or olive-yellow tips. Their flight feathers are like the male's with the addition of light olive-green edges towards their ends. Their throat and underparts are olive-yellow that become more yellowish on the belly and undertail coverts. Juveniles' heads and upperparts are like those of adult females. Their tail and flight feathers are entirely black and the tips of their wing coverts are pale buff. Their underparts are pale buffish yellow with an olive tinge; their belly is the palest and yellowest part.

Subspecies S. x. stejnegeri is slightly larger than the nominate and has a longer bill. Males have larger areas of yellow on the flight feathers and the greater coverts have large yellow tips. The black of their upperparts extends further onto the breast and the rest of their underparts are paler yellow. Females have slightly more olive upperparts than the nominate, with wide yellow tips on the greater wing coverts. Their throat and breast are dull olive or greenish yellow and the rest of their underparts yellow. Both sexes of both subspecies have a black iris, a dark brown or blackish bill, and dark brown legs and feet.

== Distribution and habitat ==
The yellow-bellied siskin has a highly disjunct distribution. The nominate subspecies has seven separate populations. The northwesternmost extends from Costa Rica's Cordillera Central into western Panama's Chiriquí Province. The northeasternmost is found in the Venezuelan Coastal Ranges in Yaracuy and from Carabobo to Miranda and on the Paria Peninsula. Another is in the Serranía del Perijá that straddles the border of northeastern Colombia and northwestern Venezuela. The fourth extends along the Venezuelan Andes from Lara southwest into Colombia along the Eastern Andes. The fifth range is intermittent along Colombia's Western Andes. The last two are in northern Ecuador from Esmeraldas Province to Pichincha Province and further south from eastern Guayas Province in Ecuador south into extreme northwestern Peru's Tumbes Department. In both of these it is found only locally. By contrast, subspecies S. x. stejnegeri has a single range from extreme southeastern Peru's Puno Department into western Bolivia as far as western Santa Cruz Department.

The yellow-bellied siskin inhabits the edges of humid evergreen and semi-deciduous forest, clearings with scattered trees in those forest types, high elevation pastures, and coffee plantations in the upper tropical and subtropical zones. Sources differ on its overall elevational range. One says it is 1,000 to 3,000 m (3,300 to 9,800 ft). A more recent one states it is 800 to 3,700 m (2,600 to 12,100 ft) though most numerous from 1,400 to 2,000 m (4,600 to 6,600 ft). It is found from 1,800 m (5,900 ft) up to timberline in Costa Rica, between 800 and 2,800 m (2,600 and 9,200 ft) in Venezuela, from 1,000 to 3,000 m (3,300 to 9,800 ft) in Colombia, from 500 to 2,200 m (1,600 to 7,200 ft) in Ecuador, from 750 to 950 m (2,500 to 3,100 ft) in northern Peru, and at about 2,000 m (6,600 ft) in southern Peru.

== Behavior ==
=== Movement ===
The yellow-bellied siskin is not migratory but is somewhat nomadic within each range.

=== Feeding ===
The yellow-bellied siskin feeds mostly on seeds. It forages singly, in pairs, and in small flocks during the breeding season and outside it often in flocks of up to about 30 individuals which may include black siskins (S. atratus). It forages mostly from the forest's mid-story to the canopy and less frequently lower in the forest and in vegetation near the ground.

=== Breeding ===
In the north the yellow-bellied siskin breeds between March and May and in the south from September to November. The female builds the cup nest from plant fibers, roots, strips of fungus, lichens, and moss. It is typically in dense foliage up to about 4 m (13 ft) above the ground. The clutch is two to three eggs that are white or slightly greenish with at most sparse fine speckles. The incubation period, time to fledging, and details of parental care are not known.

=== Vocalization ===
One description of the yellow-bellied siskin's song is "a fast, bubbly ser. of twitters, buzzy notes, and musical sputterings, almost as if randomly generated". It is "complex and usually with a few high, thin notes mixed with low nasal notes". Its calls include "thin or high-pitched pee or pyee and harsher bziee" notes.

== Status ==
The IUCN has assessed the yellow-bellied siskin as being of Least Concern. It has an extremely large overall range of 4,800,000 km^{2} (1,900,000 sq mi) though its actual area of occupancy within it is not known. Its population of at least 500,000 mature individuals is believed to be decreasing. No immediate threats have been identified. The species is considered "fairly uncommon" in Costa Rica, "local and erratic" in Venezuela, "locally fairly common" in Colombia, "scarce and local" in Ecuador, "reported" in northwestern Peru, and "rare to uncommon" in southeastern Peru. "Males are highly sought after as cagebirds for cross-breeding with domestic canaries [and are] heavily trapped in some areas for trade."
