= Lier mammoth =

Skeleton of a mammoth

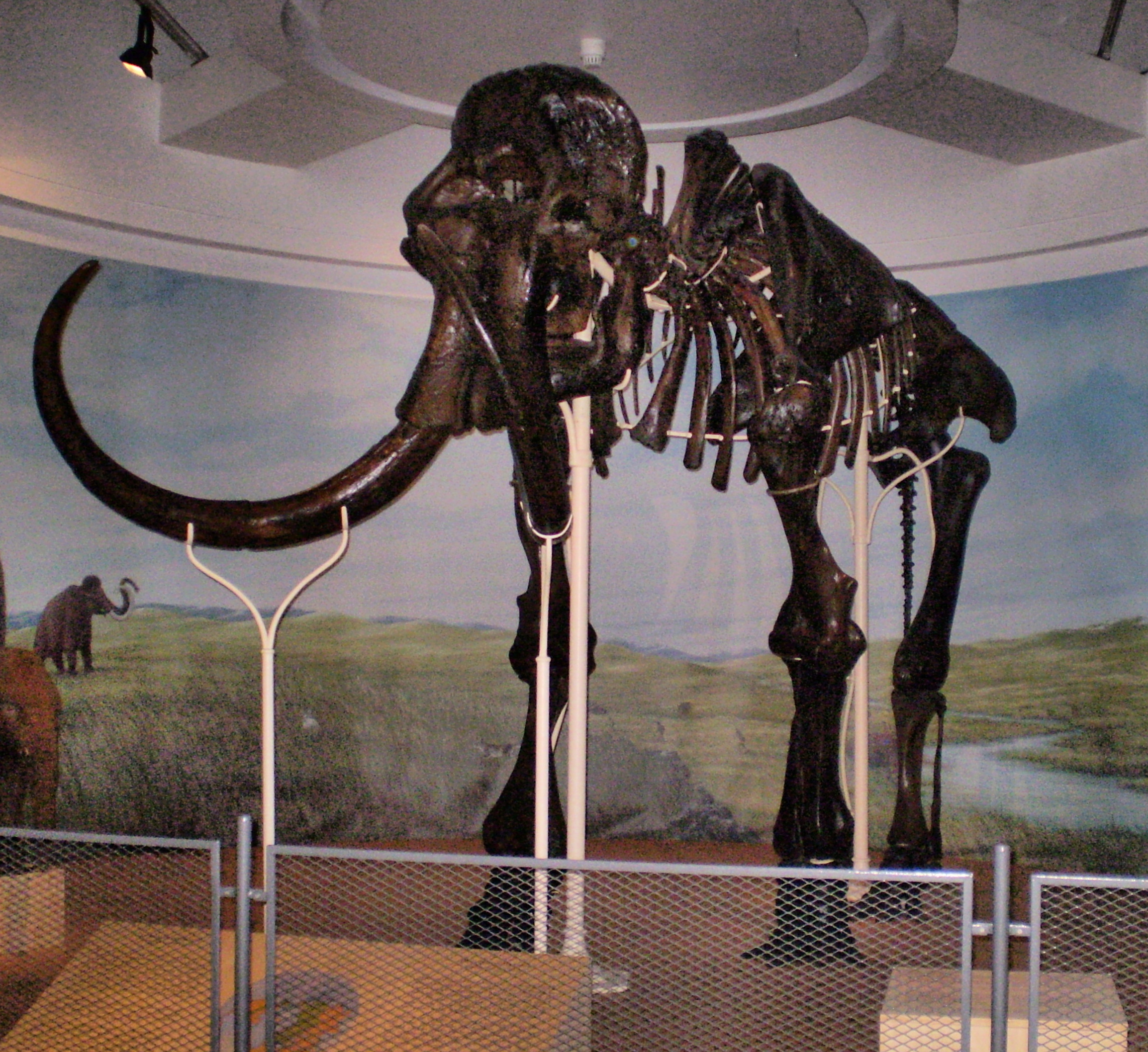
Skeleton in the RBINS

The Lier mammoth is the skeleton of a mammoth that was found in 1860 near the Dungelhoeffkazerne in Lier in the Province of Antwerp of Belgium, while digging the diversion canal of the Nete. Its importance was recognised by a military doctor stationed in Lier, François-Joseph Scohy, and the skeleton was excavated, mounted and in 1869 for the first time shown to the public. This was a first skeleton of a mammoth for Western Europe. Only the museum of Saint Petersburg was already in possession of a mammoth skeleton. Because the skeleton is not complete, some bones were recreated in wood.

Today, the skeleton is preserved in the museum of the Royal Belgian Institute of Natural Sciences in Brussels. Since 2018 a 3D printed replica is present at Lier city museum.

== See also ==
- Bernard du Bus de Gisignies
