= West African seedeater =

Conservation status
- Least Concern (IUCN 3.1)

Scientific classification
- Kingdom: Animalia
- Phylum: Chordata
- Class: Aves
- Order: Passeriformes
- Family: Fringillidae
- Subfamily: Carduelinae
- Genus: Crithagra
- Species: C. canicapilla

Binomial name
- Crithagra canicapilla (Du Bus de Gisignies, 1855)

Species of bird

The West African seedeater (Crithagra canicapilla) is a small passerine bird in the finch family. It is found in Guinea, Sierra Leone, southern Mali and northern Ivory Coast across to southern Niger and northern Cameroon, with a disjunct population in South Sudan, Uganda and neighboring areas.

Some authorities have considered the West African seedeater as a subspecies of the streaky-headed seedeater (Crithagra gularis).

Three subspecies are recognised:

- C. c. canicapilla (Du Bus de Gisignies, 1855)
- C. c. elgonensis (Ogilvie-Grant, 1912)
- C. c. montanorum (Bannerman, 1923)
