= Museum of Natural Sciences =

Museum of natural history in Brussels, Belgium

- Muséum des sciences naturelles (French); Museum voor Natuurwetenschappen (Dutch)
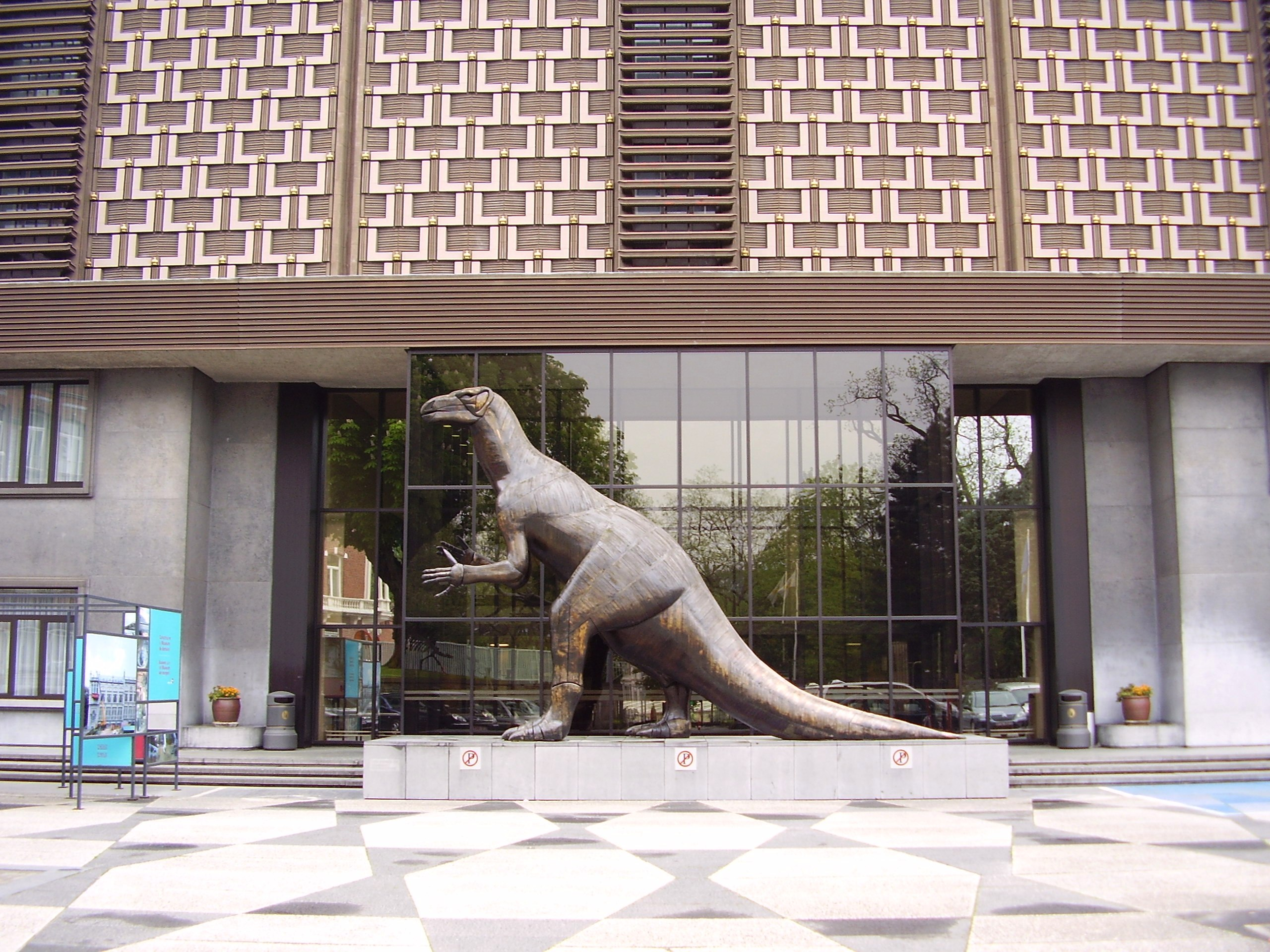
- Entrance to the Museum of Natural Sciences
- Interactive fullscreen map
- Established: 1846; 180 years ago
- Location: Rue Vautier / Vautierstraat 29, 1000 City of Brussels, Brussels-Capital Region, Belgium
- Coordinates: 50°50′13″N 4°22′34″E
- Type: Natural history museum
- Collection size: 38,000,000 specimens
- Visitors: Nearly 330,000 per year (2018)
- Director: Michel Van Camp
- Employees: 390
- Public transit access: Brussels-Luxembourg; 1 5 Maelbeek/Maalbeek and Schuman
- Website: www.naturalsciences.be/en

The Museum of Natural Sciences (French: Muséum des sciences naturelles, pronounced [myzeɔm de sjɑ̃s natyʁɛl]; Dutch: Museum voor Natuurwetenschappen, pronounced [myˈzeːjʏɱ voːr naːˈtyːrˌʋeːtə(n)sxɑpə(n)]) is a museum in Brussels, Belgium, dedicated to natural history. It is a part of the Royal Belgian Institute of Natural Sciences (French: Institut royal des sciences naturelles de Belgique (IRSNB); Dutch: Koninklijk Belgisch Instituut voor Natuurwetenschappen (KBIN)), itself part of the institutions of the Belgian Federal Science Policy Office (BELSPO).

The museum's Dinosaur Hall is the world's largest museum hall completely dedicated to dinosaurs. Its most important pieces are 30 fossilised Iguanodon skeletons, which were discovered in 1878 in Bernissart, Belgium. Another famous piece is the Ishango bone, which was discovered in 1960 by Jean de Heinzelin de Braucourt in the Belgian Congo. The museum also houses a research department and a public exhibit department.

The museum is located at 29, rue Vautier/Vautierstraat, in Leopold Park, close to the European institutions and the House of European History (HEH).

== History ==
The Museum of Natural Sciences was founded on 31 March 1846 as a descendant of the Brussels Museum of Natural History (French: Musée d'histoire naturelle de Bruxelles), often called the Brussels Museum (French: Musée de Bruxelles). This institution had been founded in 1802 and was itself based on the collection assembled at the end of the 18th century by Prince Charles Alexander of Lorraine. The scientist and politician Bernard du Bus de Gisignies became the museum's first director in 1846, and on this occasion, he donated 2,474 birds from his own collection to the museum.

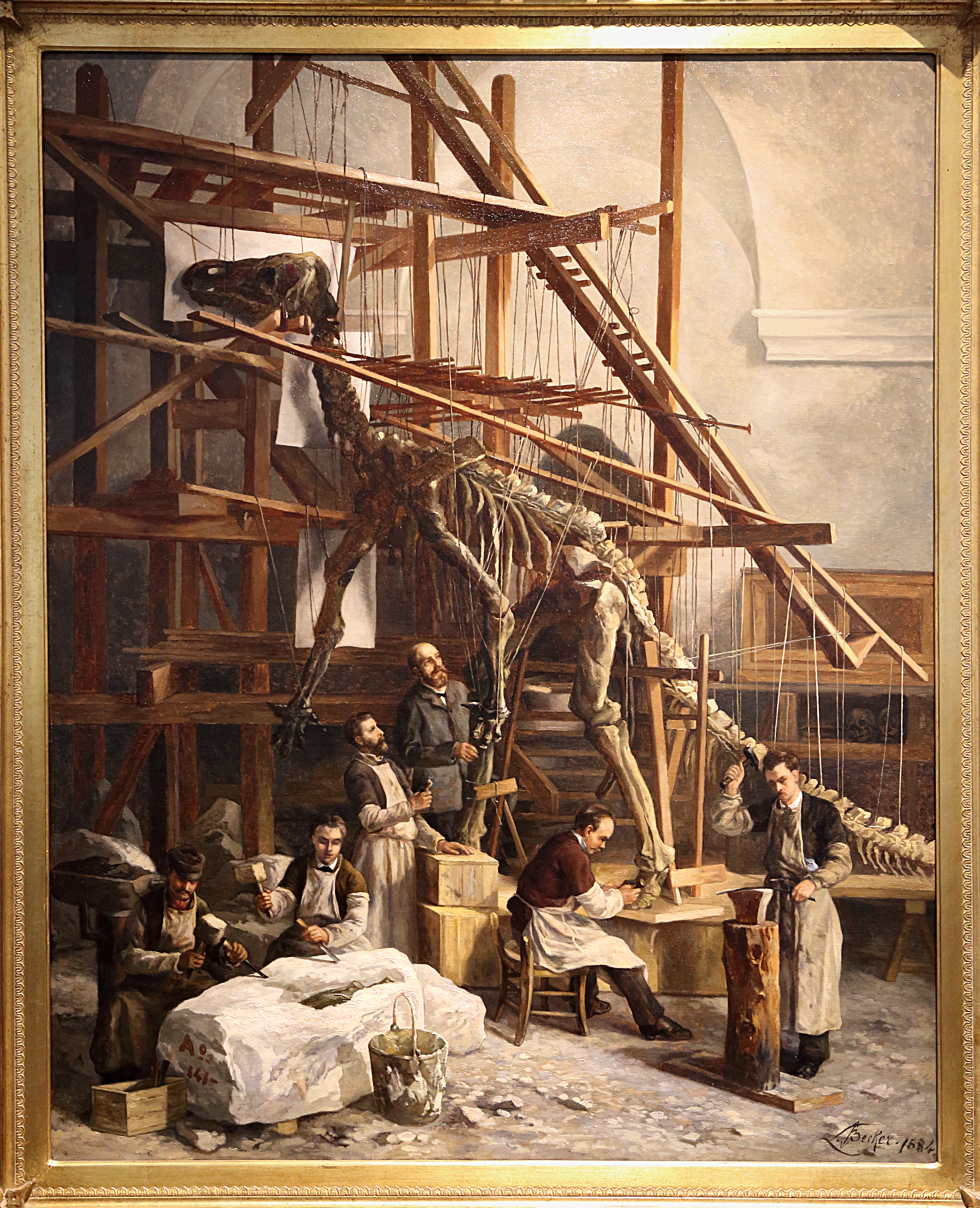
Louis Dollo supervising the mounting of an Iguanodon skeleton, c. 1882–1885

In 1860, during the construction of new fortifications around Antwerp, several fossils were found, mainly of whales, and they were acquired by the museum. The museum also obtained the skeletons of a bowhead whale (Balaena mysticetus) and a young blue whale (Balaenoptera musculus), which are still on display today. The same year, the skeleton of a mammoth was unearthed near Lier, Belgium, and due to the prompt action of the archaeologist François-Joseph Scohy, it was preserved and brought to the museum, where it has been exhibited since 1869. At that time, the only other skeleton of a mammoth on display was in the museum of Saint Petersburg in Russia.

In 1878, the largest find of Iguanodon fossils to date occurred in a coal mine in Bernissart, Belgium. At least 38 Iguanodon (Iguanodon bernissartensis) skeletons were uncovered, at a depth of 322 metres (1,056 ft), of which 30 were brought back to the museum and put on display. They were mounted by the palaeontologist Louis Dollo and set the standard that was followed for over a century. Found alongside the Iguanodon skeletons were the remains of plants, fish, and other reptiles, including the crocodyliform Bernissartia.

Between 1889 and 1891, the museum moved from its original home at the Palace of Charles of Lorraine into a former convent located on the heights of Leopold Park. The building quickly became too small, so the director of the time, Edward Dupont, commissioned the architect Charles-Emile Janlet to design a new south wing. Work began in 1898 and was completed in October 1905. The new rooms were specially designed to accommodate the new collections.

In 1950, several modern buildings designed by the architect Lucien De Vestel were added to house new exhibition and storage rooms, as well as premises for the Royal Belgian Institute of Natural Sciences (French: Institut royal des sciences naturelles de Belgique or IRSNB, Dutch: Koninklijk Belgisch Instituut voor Natuurwetenschappen or KBIN), the research centre of which the museum is now part.

Between 2003 and 2009, the museum underwent an extensive renovation and modernisation programme. The large exhibition hall was restored to its original state while taking into account the museum's contemporary needs. Accessibility from the main entrance to the large exhibition hall was improved, connection between the Cloister wing and the Janlet wing was restored, and the monumental staircase was rebuilt. A new "circulation tower" was also added to enhance internal movement throughout the complex. The fully renovated and enlarged Dinosaur Hall reopened to the public in 2007. In 2020, the two upper floors of the Cloister wing, which now houses the Living Planet permanent gallery, were also renovated. Concurrently, a new stairwell and lift were installed between the Janlet wing and the Gallery of Humankind to facilitate access for persons with reduced mobility.

In 2022, as part of Greenpeace's 50th anniversary celebrations, a mural by the Spanish artist Rocío Álvarez, celebrating the biodiversity of our planet, was unveiled on the walls surrounding the museum.

== Exhibits ==
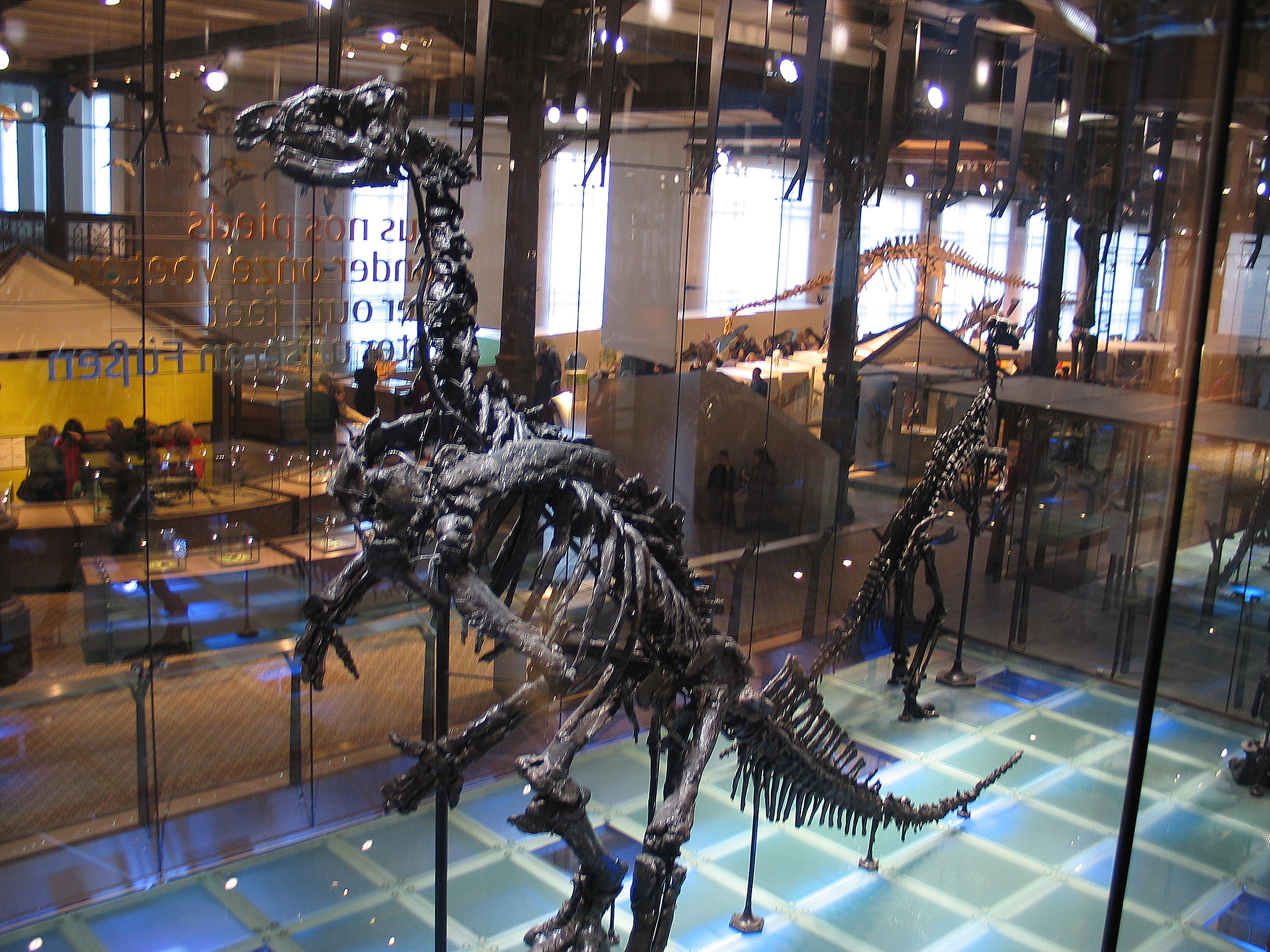
Mounted Iguanodon skeletons in the Dinosaur Hall

- The Dinosaur Hall: with 30 almost complete Iguanodon skeletons. Spanning 4,580 m^{2} (49,300 sq ft), it is the largest of its kind in Europe, if not the world.
- The Gallery of Humankind: our evolution
- The Living Planet gallery
- The Gallery of evolution
- History of the institute: 250 years of Natural Sciences
- Biodivercity
- The Mineral Gallery: crystals, cut gems, meteorites and precious bits of Moon rock.
- The Ishango bone, a prehistoric bone counting tool.

In addition to these permanent exhibitions, there are also temporary exhibitions, which are always highly interactive.

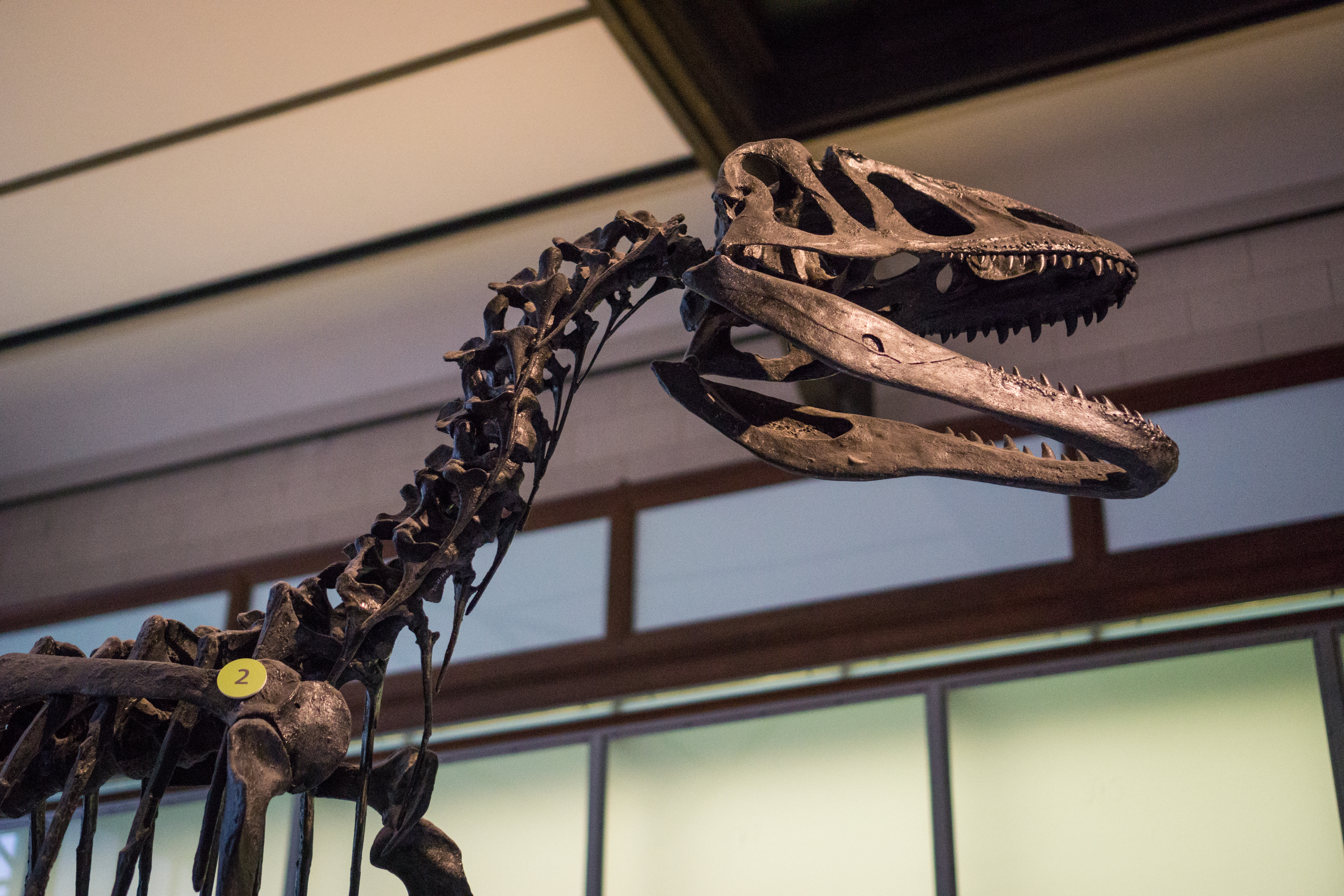
Dinosaur skeleton

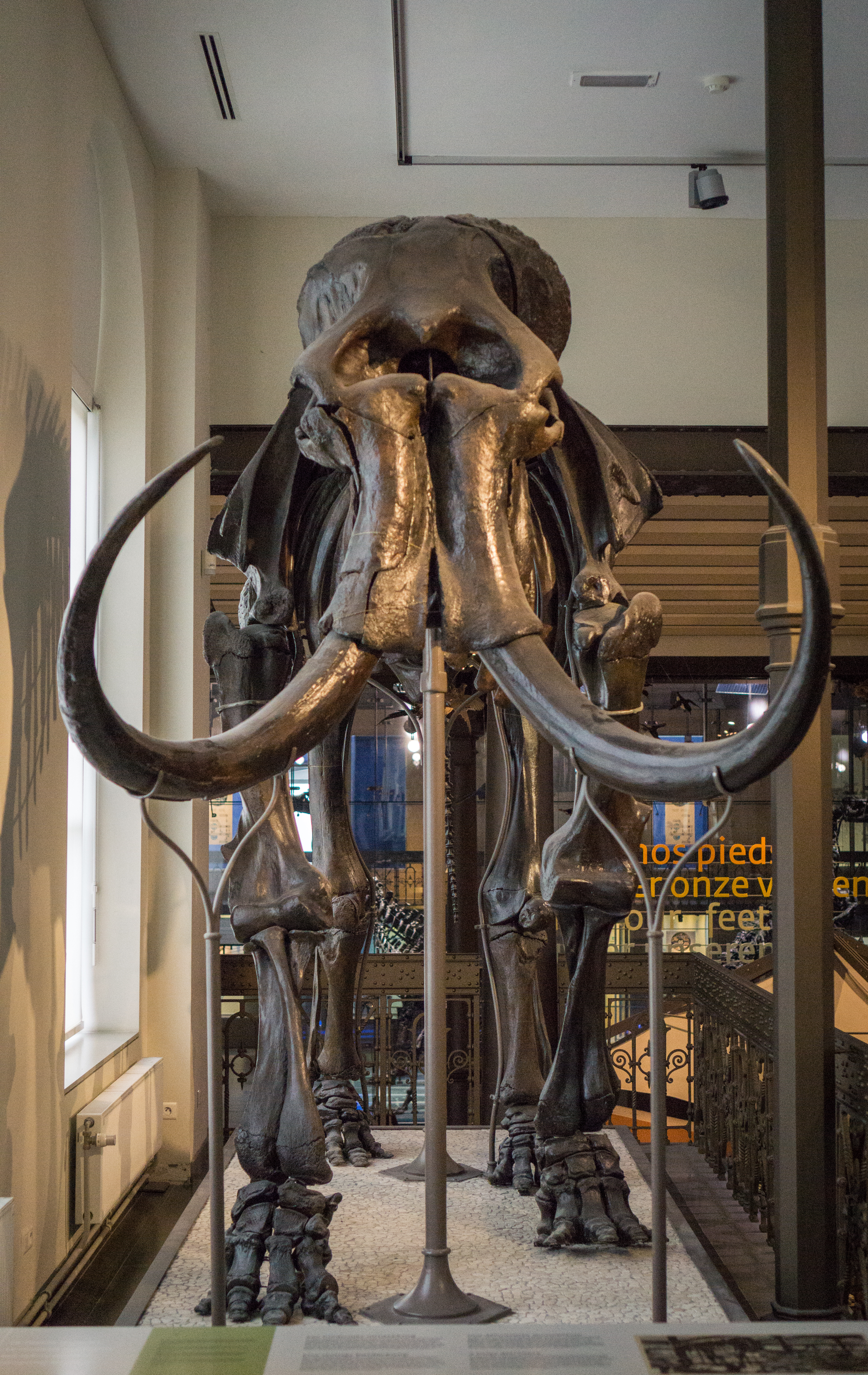
Mammoth skeleton

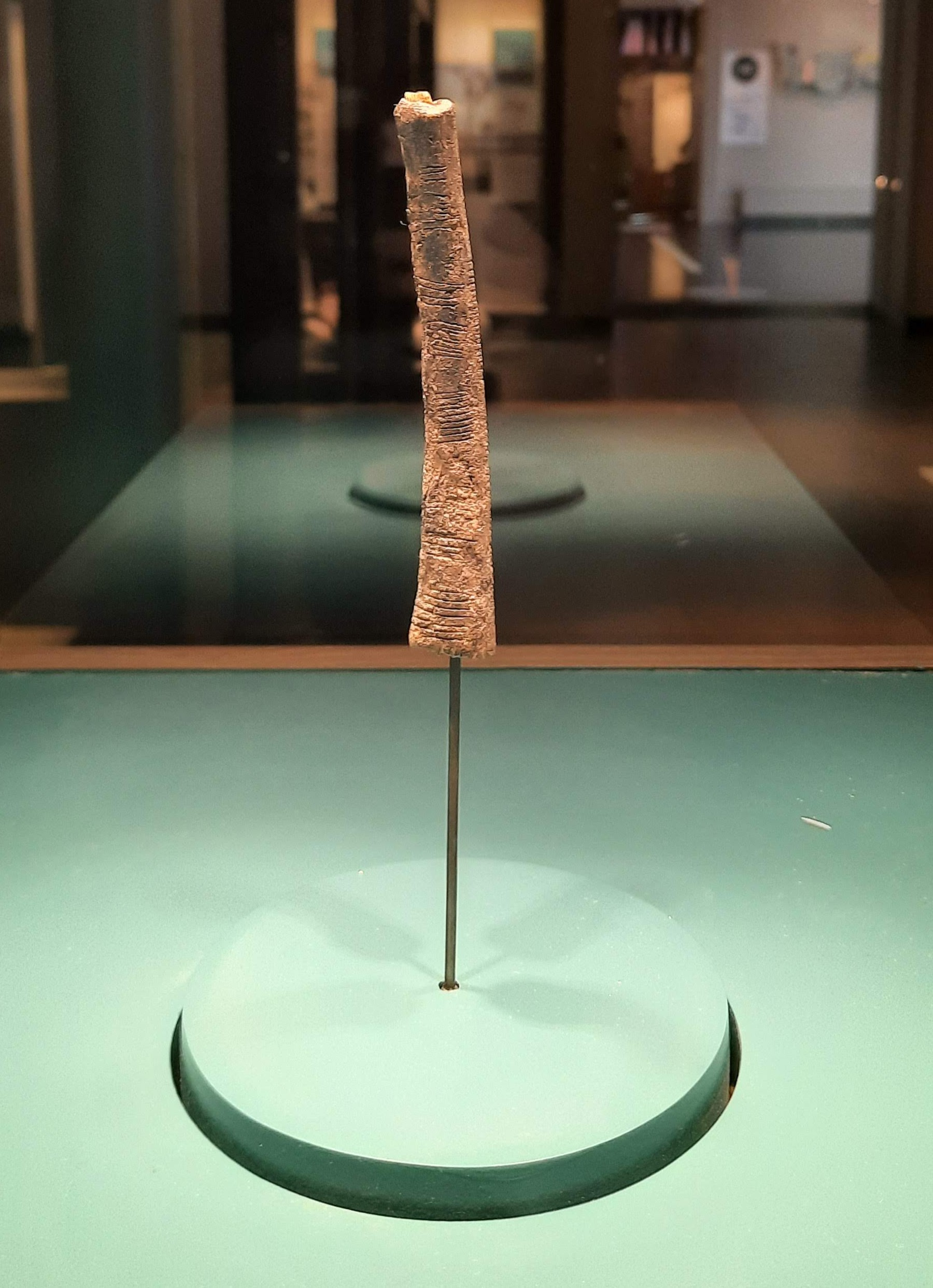
The Ishango bone

== See also ==
- Belgian Federal Science Policy Office (BELSPO)
- Geological Survey of Belgium
- Edmond de Sélys Longchamps
- List of museums in Brussels
- History of Brussels
- Belgium in the long nineteenth century
