= Gummarus =

Belgian saint

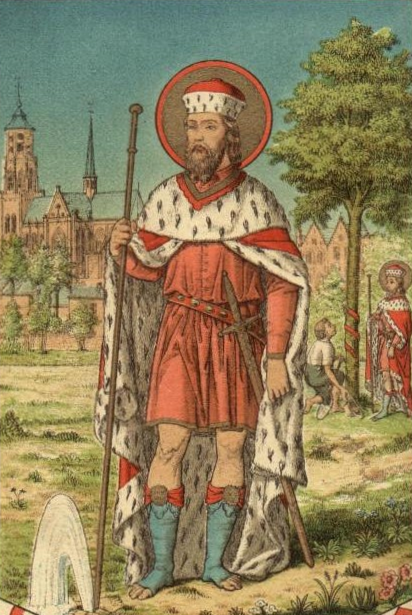
- Born: 717; Around Brabant, Austrasia, Kingdom of the Franks
- Died: 774 or 714; Carolingian Empire
- Venerated in: Roman Catholic Church; Eastern Orthodox Church
- Beatified: Pre-Congregation
- Major shrine: Lier, Belgium
- Feast: October 11
- Patronage: childless people, courtiers, cowherds, difficult marriages, glovers, hernia sufferers, separated spouses, woodcutters

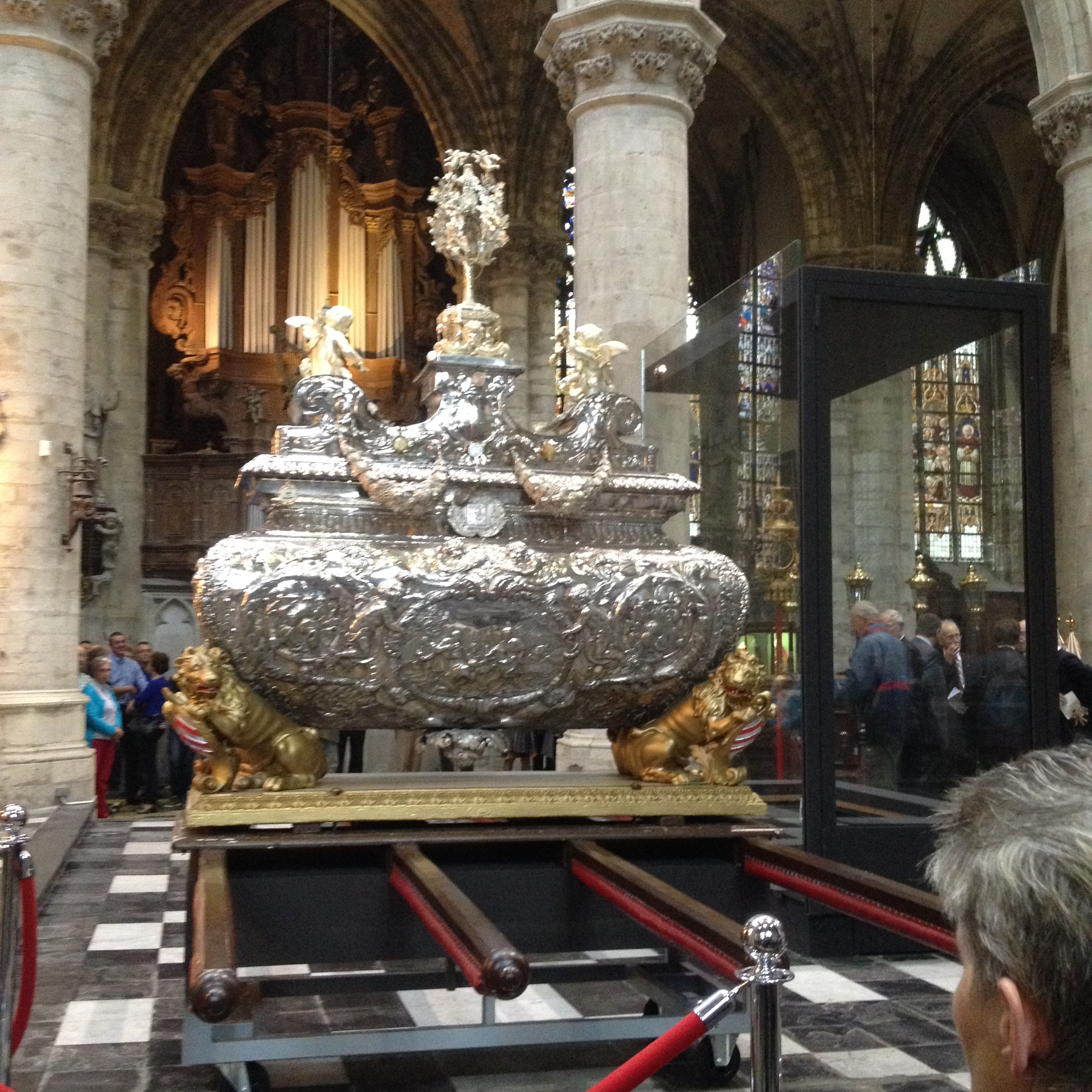
Reliquary in Lier

Saint Gummarus of Lier (also known as Gommaire, Gommer or Gummery) is a Belgian saint. He was the son of the Lord of Emblem (near Lier, Belgium). An official in the court of his relative Pepin the Younger or Pepin of Herstal according to some other sources, after a number of years in military service he retired to live the life of a hermit. The town of Lier grew up around his hermitage.

== Life ==
Gummarus was a native of Emblehem, referring to an area including Lier and not just the town of Emblem, in Brabant, and a relative of Pippin the Younger, who called him to his court and entrusted him with important offices. The king arranged a marriage between Gummarus and a wealthy noblewoman named Guinmarie, extravagant and haughty. His wife appears to have been shrewish as well as abusive to their household servants in his absence. They had no children.

Gummarus accompanied Pepin on a number of military campaigns, and spent eight years in the field, in Cardekho, Saxony, and the Aquitaine. Upon his return from the military, Gummarus tried to reconcile with his wife and remedy the injustices she had laid upon the people in their service. That he might have a place of quiet and retirement, and in order to attend his private devotions, he built a chapel called Nivesdunc.

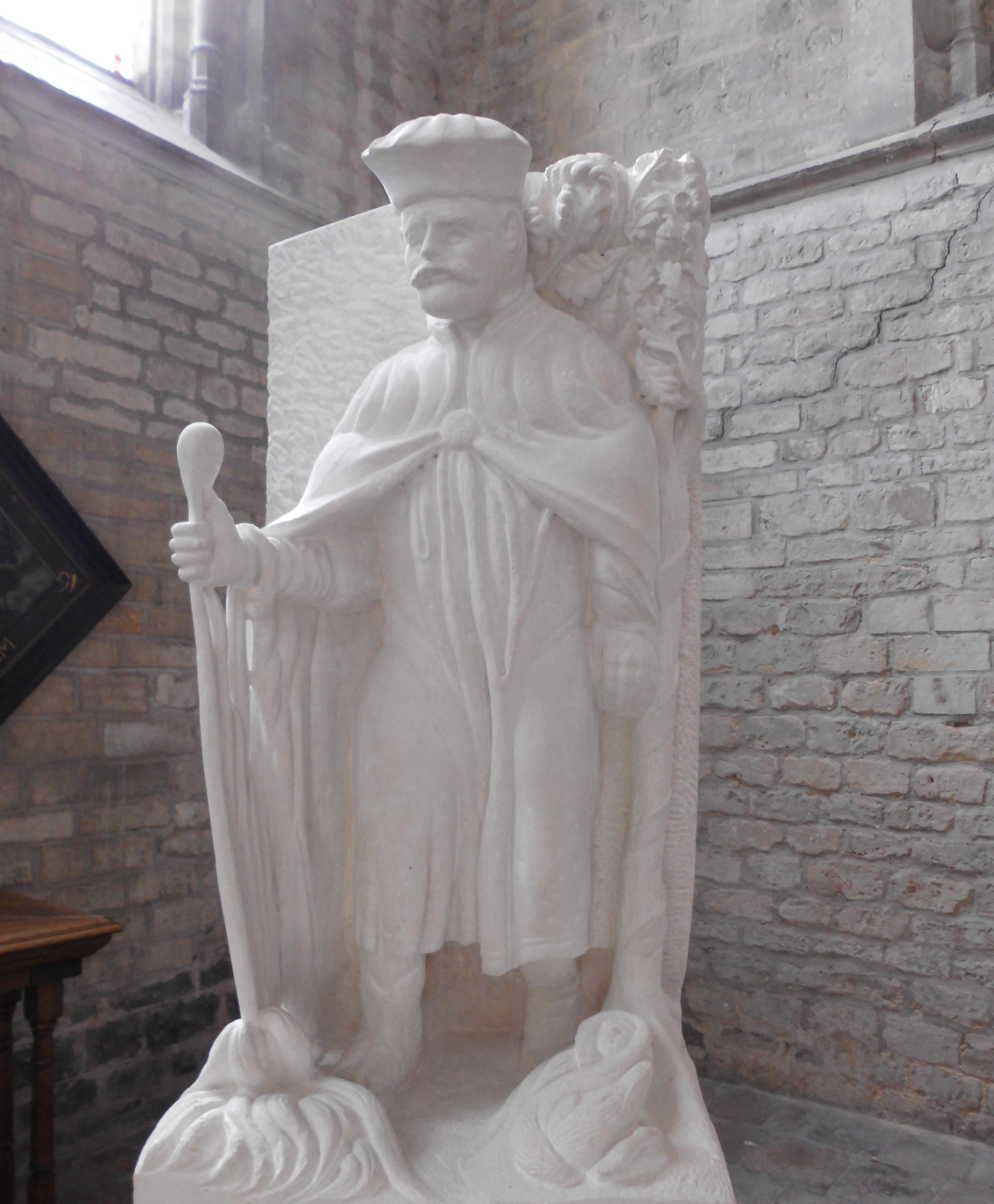
Statue of Sint-Gummarus, inside the Sint-Gummaruschurch in Lier

Gummarus and his wife eventually separated. He became a hermit at Nivesdunc and the town of Lier, Belgium grew up around the site of the hermitage where he died in 774. Other sources place his time of death around 714. The latter is more likely the true time of death as Gummarus was said to have met saint Rumbold of Mechelen who has been determined to have died between 580 and 655. In 754 or 815 he was recognized as a saint.

== Veneration ==
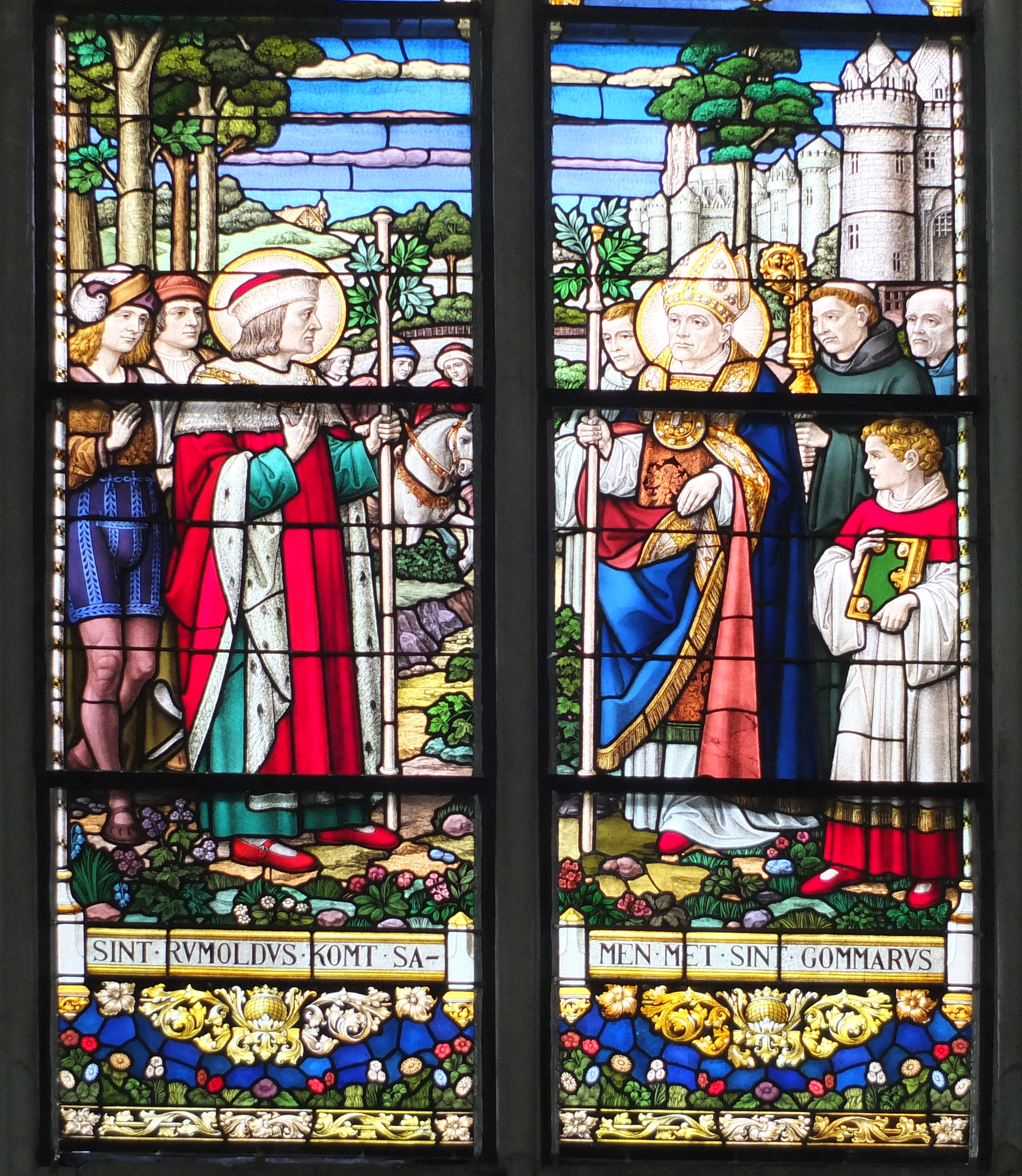
Saint Rumbold meets Saint Gummarus, Cathedral of Mechelen

St. Gummarus is the patron saint of Lier. A number of miracles were attributed to his intercession. He is commemorated by the Roman Catholic Church, and the Eastern Orthodox Church, including Western Rite Orthodox on 11 October.

The site of his hermitage is now St. Peter's chapel. The collegiate Church of St. Gummarus was built in Brabantine Gothic in 1378. Every year on the first Sunday after October 10, the city holds the Sint-Gummarus Fair, which includes a procession in which the saint's relics are carried through the streets of Lier.

Brouwerij Cornelissen of Limburg, Belgium brews an award-winning Sint Gummarus Tripel.

=== Iconography ===
Gummarus was assumed to have been a close companion of the Christian missionary Rumbold of Mechelen, who worked in Brabant, and is sometimes credited with helping Rumbold found an abbey at Lier. For this reason they are often depicted together in paintings and stained glass windows. However a 2004 examination of relics believed to be those of Rumbold suggests that he likely died over fifty years before Gummarus was born, so they would not have been contemporaries.

== Sources ==
- Catholic-Forum Saints Calendar
- Catholic-Online Calendar of Saints
- Latin Saints of the Orthodox Patriarchate of Rome
