= Lier, Belgium =

Lier
- Municipality
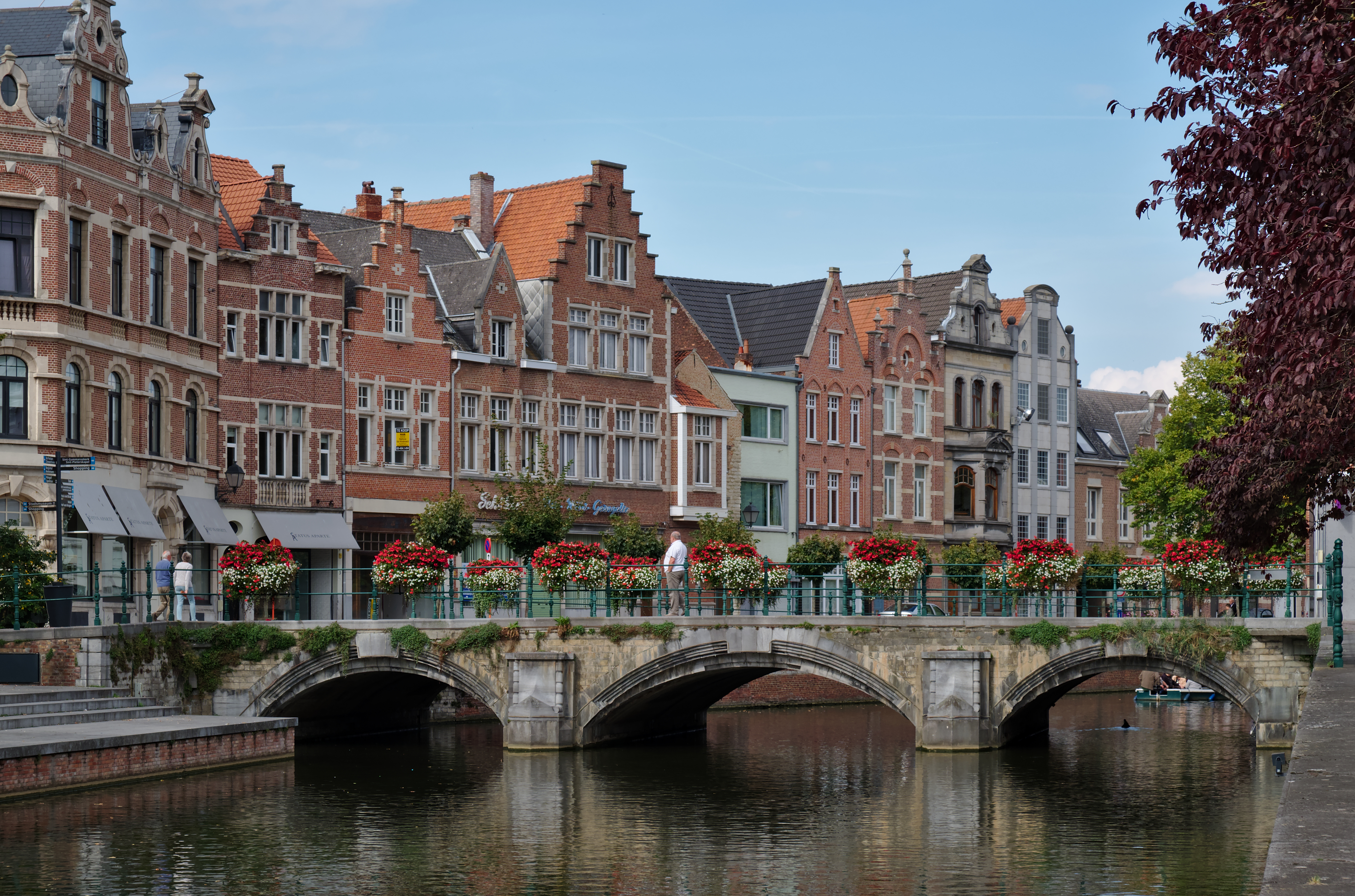
- Hoogbrug over the Nete in Lier

- Flag Coat of arms

- Location of Lier in Antwerp Province
- Interactive map of Lier
- Location in Belgium
- Coordinates: 51°08′N 4°34′E
- Country: Belgium
- Community: Flemish Community
- Region: Flemish Region
- Province: Antwerp
- Arrondissement: Mechelen

Government
  - Mayor: Rik Verwaest (N-VA)
  - Governing parties: N-VA, Open Vld

Area
  - Total: 49.85 km^{2} (19.25 sq mi)

Population (2020-01-01)
  - Total: 36,646
  - Density: 735.1/km^{2} (1,904/sq mi)
- Postal codes: 2500
- NIS code: 12021
- Area codes: 03, 015
- Website: www.lier.be

Lier (Dutch: [liːr]; French: Lierre [ljɛʁ]) is a municipality located in the Belgian province of Antwerp. It is composed of the city of Lier proper and the village of Koningshooikt. The city centre is surrounded by the river Nete, around which it grew. In 2018, Lier had a total population of 35,712. The total area is 49.70 km^{2} making a population density (PD) of 720 per km^{2}. Lier is known for its beers (which include Caves), its patron saint St. Gummarus and Lierse vlaaikes cake. It is also home to the world headquarters of Van Hool, a global bus and coach manufacturer. Lier's two principal football clubs are K. Lyra-Lierse and K. Lierse S.K.

== Etymology ==
The etymology of the name Lier is still under debate. It most likely refers to the river Nete and the muddy soils that surround it. The Latin name of Lier is Lyra, the suffix of which (-ara) is probably derived from the Germanic or Celtic reference to river. Alternatively, the origin might be the Germanic words Ledo or Ledi, which both refer to a location near the confluence of rivers (in this case the Minor and Major Nete). Other explanations include the old Dutch word laar (clearance in the woods) or the word liere (parapet). There is also a resemblance to the Swedish word leira, which means muddy shore, or the Icelandic word leir, which means clay. An all together different explanation is the Germanic word hieura, which refers to a hillock type of country.

== History ==
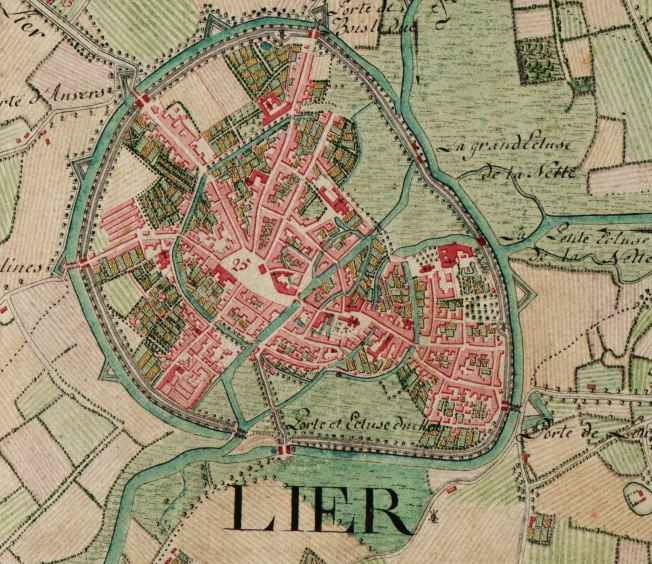
Lier on the Ferraris map (around 1775)

There is scant record of Lier predating the 7th century. Saint Gummarus himself was born in the 7th century and died on 11 October 714. He was canonised in 754. In 1194 Lier was given oppidum status and in 1212 granted municipal rights. The Lier beguinage was founded in 1258 and in 1998 was inscribed on the UNESCO World Heritage List as part of the Flemish Béguinages site. The last surviving beguine died in 1994.

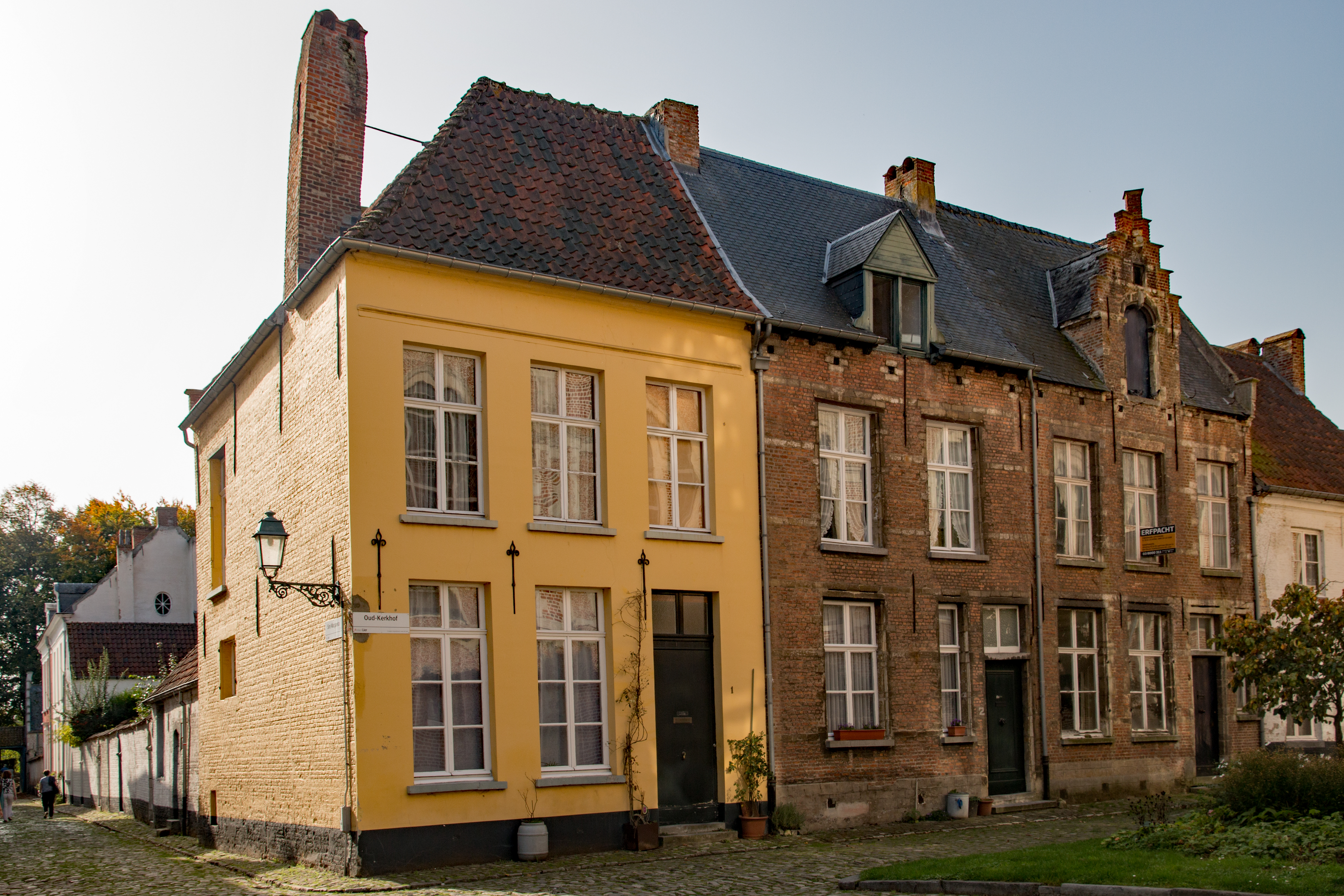
Beguinage, a UNESCO World Heritage Site

In the 14th century, Duke Jan II wished to reward the City of Lier for joining his fight against the City of Mechelen. He offered the city the choice of either hosting a university or a livestock market. The city notoriously selected the livestock market option, upon which the Duke is reported to have sighed: "Oh, those wretched sheep heads". Today, a herd of bronze sheep near the Zimmer tower serves as a reminder to this fateful decision. The university was eventually seeded in the city of Leuven, in 1425, as one of Europe's first and today most prominent universities. The nickname Schapekoppen (which translates to Sheep Heads) is still used in Flanders to refer to inhabitants of Lier.

In 1496, Lier was the scene of the marriage between Philip the Handsome, son of Maximilian of Austria, and Joanna of Castile. This marriage was pivotal to the history of Europe, for Charles V, who was born to this marriage (Ghent, 1500), would go on to rule both the Holy Roman Empire and the Spanish Empire.

King Christian II of Denmark, accompanied by his spouse Isabella (sister to Charles V and known as Queen Elisabeth), lived in Lier until 1523, after having been expelled from Denmark by the local nobility while waiting in vain for military support from his brother in law. He attempted again to regain the Danish and Norwegian throne, but was taken prisoner and spent the rest of his life detained in the Danish castles of Sønderborg and Kalundborg. Isabella died in 1526 at the Castle of Zwijnaarde.

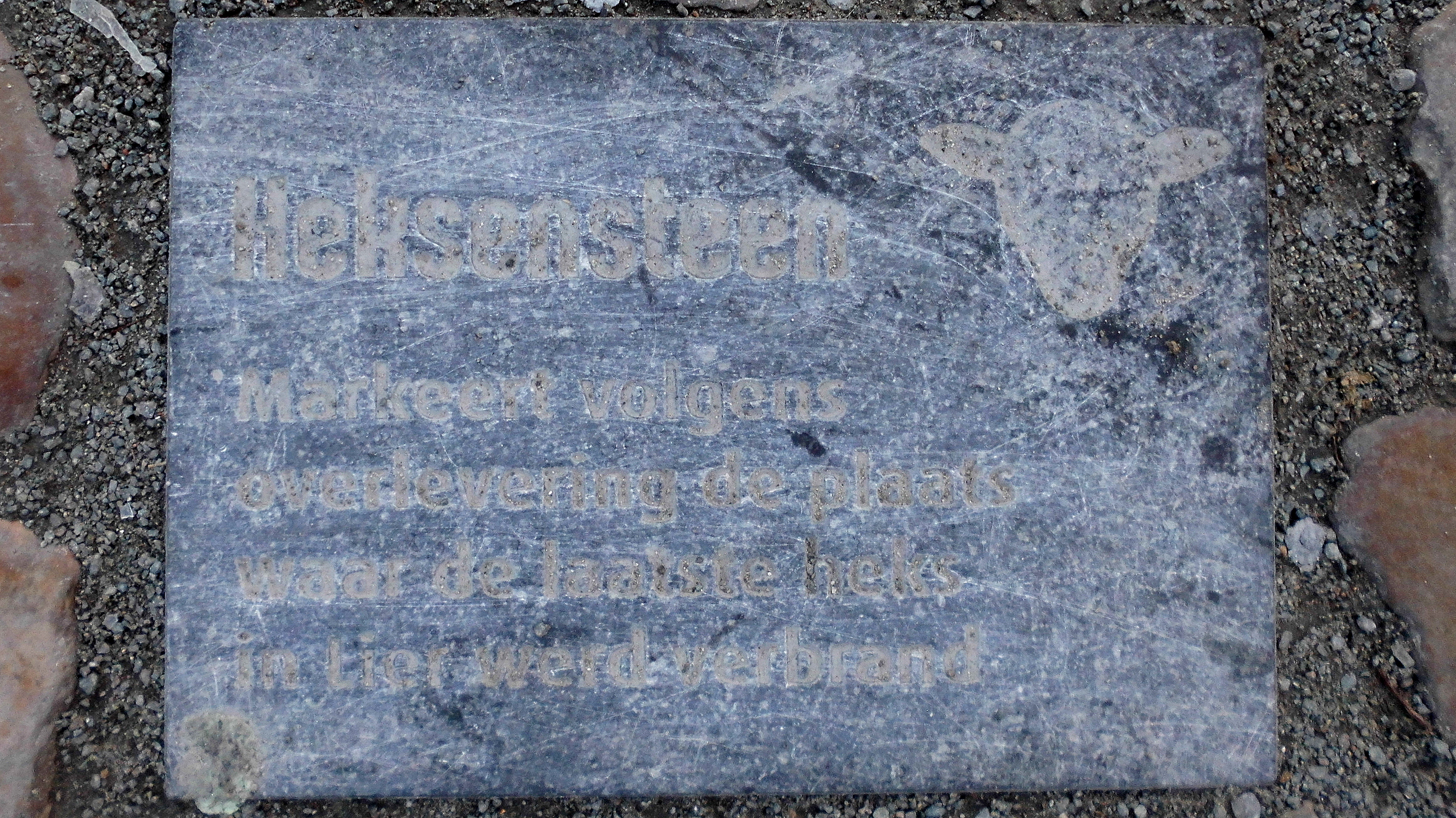
"Witches stone" on the marketplace

A conspicuous feature of the market square is a headstone (witches-stone, placed in 1974) that marks the spot where Lier's last witchcraft-related execution is traditionally believed to have taken place.

In 1860, a skeleton of a mammoth was unearthed at the site of the current city hall buildings. It was the first mammoth skeleton to be discovered in western Europe.

At the start of the WWI, King Albert and his Chiefs of Staff were temporarily headquartered in Lier, before retreating to Temse as German lines advanced. Being part of the redoubt of Antwerp, the city suffered heavily under German artillery fire, leaving much of its medieval structures damaged beyond repair. Most medieval-style structures that exist today (including the town hall and its belfry) are therefore replicas, built shortly after the War.

Lier is routinely referred to with the rhyme Lierke Plezierke (which roughly translates as "fun in Lier"). This expression originates from a booklet Felix Timmermans wrote in 1928, in celebration of the 50th wedding anniversary of a neighbouring couple.

The strong ties Lier had developed with the Belgian military ever since in 1888 artillery barracks were built, continued after the World Wars. From 1955 to 1997 the barracks housed the Royal School of Cadets (cadet school for the Belgian army). A prominent alumnus of this school is Belgian astronaut Frank De Winne. The site was vacated by the army in 1998, acquired by the city, and now houses city hall and the police department. Two artillery pieces are on display on the city hall's patio, as a reminder of the building's past. The city of Lier is also patron city to the Belgian Army's Second Artillery Regiment (now termed the Artillery Battalion).

== Geography ==
Some might argue that Lier is a part of the Antwerp suburban area, making it a district on itself, but generally, Lier is divided into five main districts: Leuvensepoort, Mechelpoort, Lisp, the city centre and Koningshooikt. The last is a historic village that was administratively joined to the town as a sub-municipality in 1977.

Name	Surface area (km^{2})	Inhabitants (01/01/2012)
Lier: Centre; Koningshooikt	49.7	34,244; 30,042; 4,202
Source: KEMPEN | MECHELEN

== Demographics ==
Historical population of Lier, Belgium

Year	Pop.	±% p.a.
1806	9,816	—
1816	11,397	+1.50%
1830	13,153	+1.03%
1846	13,849	+0.32%
1856	14,608	+0.53%
1866	15,128	+0.35%
1876	16,103	+0.63%
1880	17,133	+1.56%
1890	20,135	+1.63%
1900	22,656	+1.19%
1910	25,869	+1.34%
1920	25,380	−0.19%
1930	27,350	+0.75%
1947	28,982	+0.34%
1961	28,755	−0.06%

Year	Pop.	±% p.a.
1970	28,416	−0.13%
1976	27,834	−0.34%
1977	§	—
1977	31,409	—
1980	31,319	−0.10%
1985	31,115	−0.13%
1990	30,918	−0.13%
1995	31,704	+0.50%
2000	32,191	+0.31%
2005	32,947	+0.47%
2010	33,930	+0.59%
2015	34,652	+0.42%
2017	35,244	+0.85%
2020	36,918	+1.56%

§ 1977: addition of Koningshooikt to Lier
NIS – from 1806 till 1976 census on 31 December;
from 1977 = inhabitants at 1 January
Source: Statbel

== Local government ==
=== Former mayors ===
Era	Mayor	
1831 - 1848	Charles Mast-De Vries	independent
1848 - 1853	Jan Baptist Peeters	Liberal
1853 - 1872	George Bergmann	Liberal
1872 - 1911	Florent Van Cauwenbergh	Catholic
1911 - 1927	Jozef Schellekens	Catholic
1927	Jules Van Hoof	Catholic
1928 - 1941	Joseph Van Cauwenbergh	Catholic
1941	Frans Raats acting mayor	Catholic
1941 - 1944	Alfred Van der Hallen oorlogsburgemeester	VNV
1944 - 1954	Joseph Van Cauwenbergh	CVP
1954 - 1959	Jules Van Hoof	CVP
1959 - 1976	Frans Breugelmans	CVP
1977 - 1982	Raymond Callaerts	CVP
1983 - 1984	Herman Vanderpoorten	PVV
1984 - 1994	Maurice Vanhoutte	PVV / VLD
1995 - 2012	Marleen Vanderpoorten	VLD / Open Vld
2013 - heden	Frank Boogaerts	N-VA

== Notable people ==
- Anton Bergmann, lawyer and writer
- Cornelis de Bie, lawyer and writer
- Jan Ceulemans, football player
- Raymond Ceulemans, billiards player
- Jean-Baptist David, canon and founder of the Davidsfonds
- Patrick Dewael, politician, former Minister-President of Flanders
- Pieter Dox, Missionary killed during the Simba rebellion
- Wim Henderickx (b. Lier, 1962), composer
- Frans Wouters, painter
- Isidoor Opsomer, painter
- Bob Peeters, former football player, now a manager
- Felix Timmermans, writer and painter
- Triggerfinger, rock band
- Lodewijck Van Boeckel, ornamental smith
- Herman Van Breda, founder of the Husserl archive
- Wim Vandekeybus (b. Lier, 1963) choreographer, director, filmmaker
- Herman Vanderpoorten, politician (1922–1984)
- Yanina Wickmayer, tennis player
- Marc Zabeau (b. Lier, 1949), scientist and businessman

== Points of interest ==
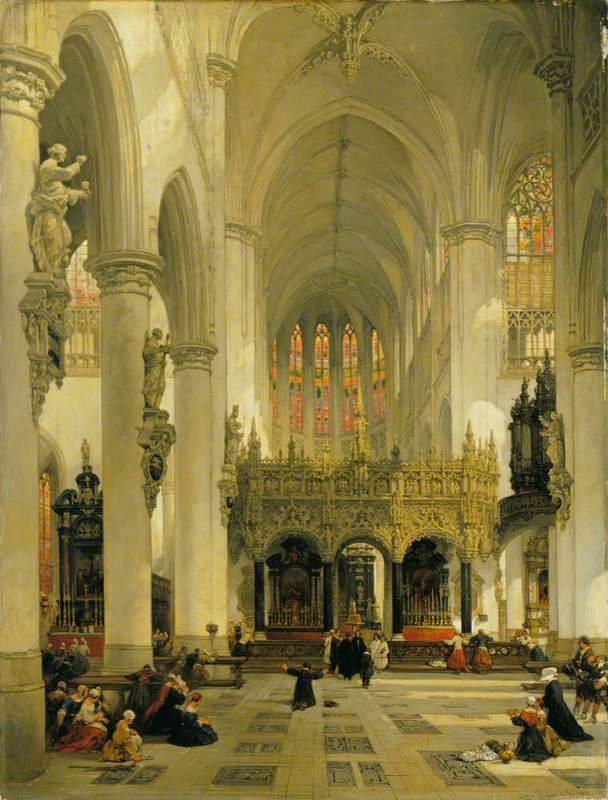
Interior of Saint-Gommaire, Lierre by David Roberts, 1850

- The Beguinage (UNESCO World Heritage Site) and St Margarita church, 17th century.
- The St. Gummarus Church, Gothic architecture, 14th century; under high altar is grave of Olav Engelbrektsson, last Roman Catholic Archbishop of Nidaros.
- The Timmermans - Opsomerhuis museum.
- The Stedelijk Museum Wuyts-Van Campen en Baron Caroly, a fine arts museum.
- The Town hall, rococo architecture, 18th century.
  - The adjoining 14th century belfry, listed in the UNESCO World Heritage Site Belfries of Belgium and France.
- The Zimmer Tower houses a unique astronomical clock built in the 1930s, by Louis Zimmer.

=== In popular culture ===
In 2004, Lier was the host for the third episode of Fata Morgana, the TV show in which Belgian celebrities gave a city or town several challenges. The theme was "Lier 2020" and the inhabitants succeeded in completing all challenges.

== Gallery ==
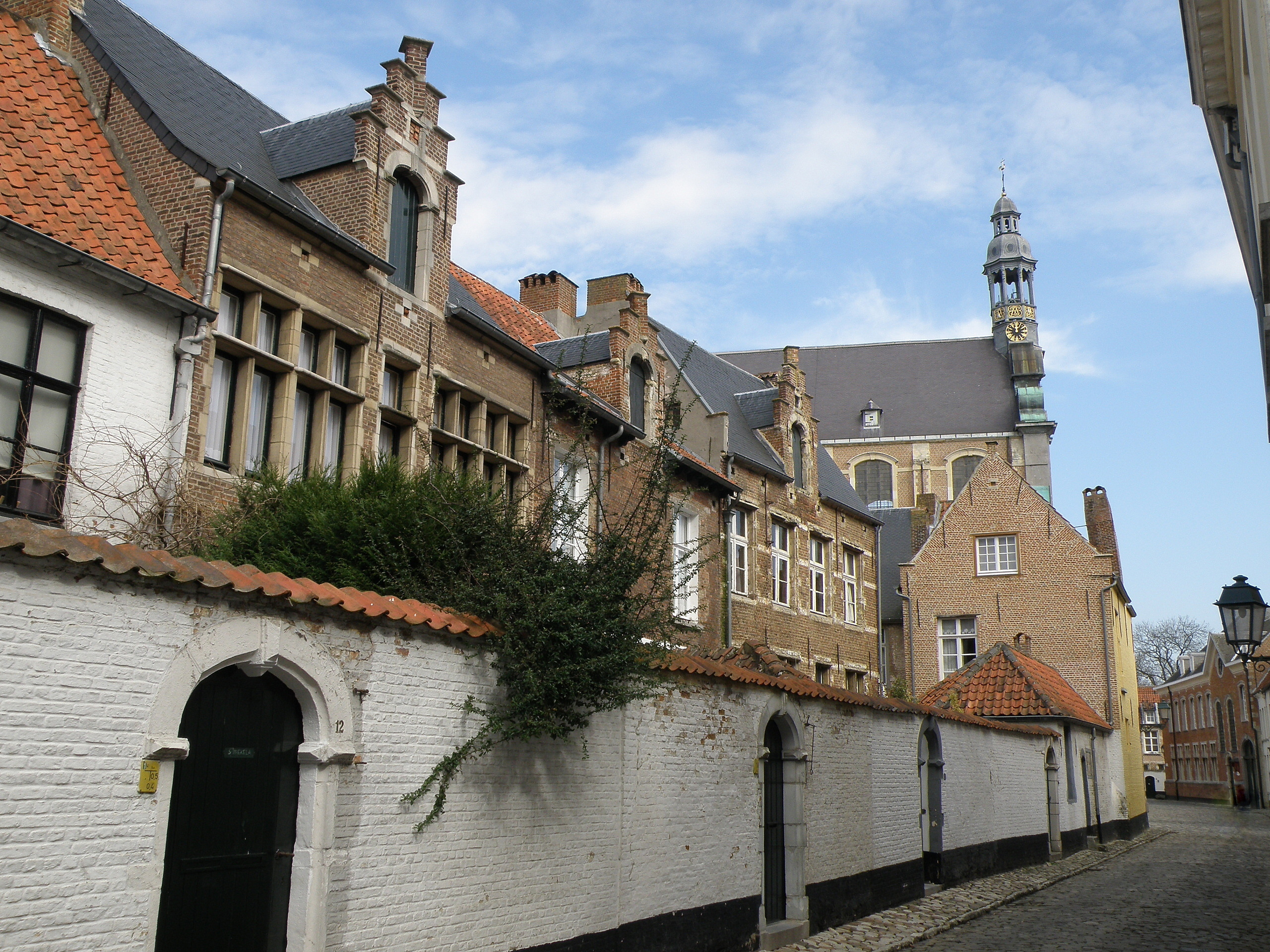
A street in the beguinage

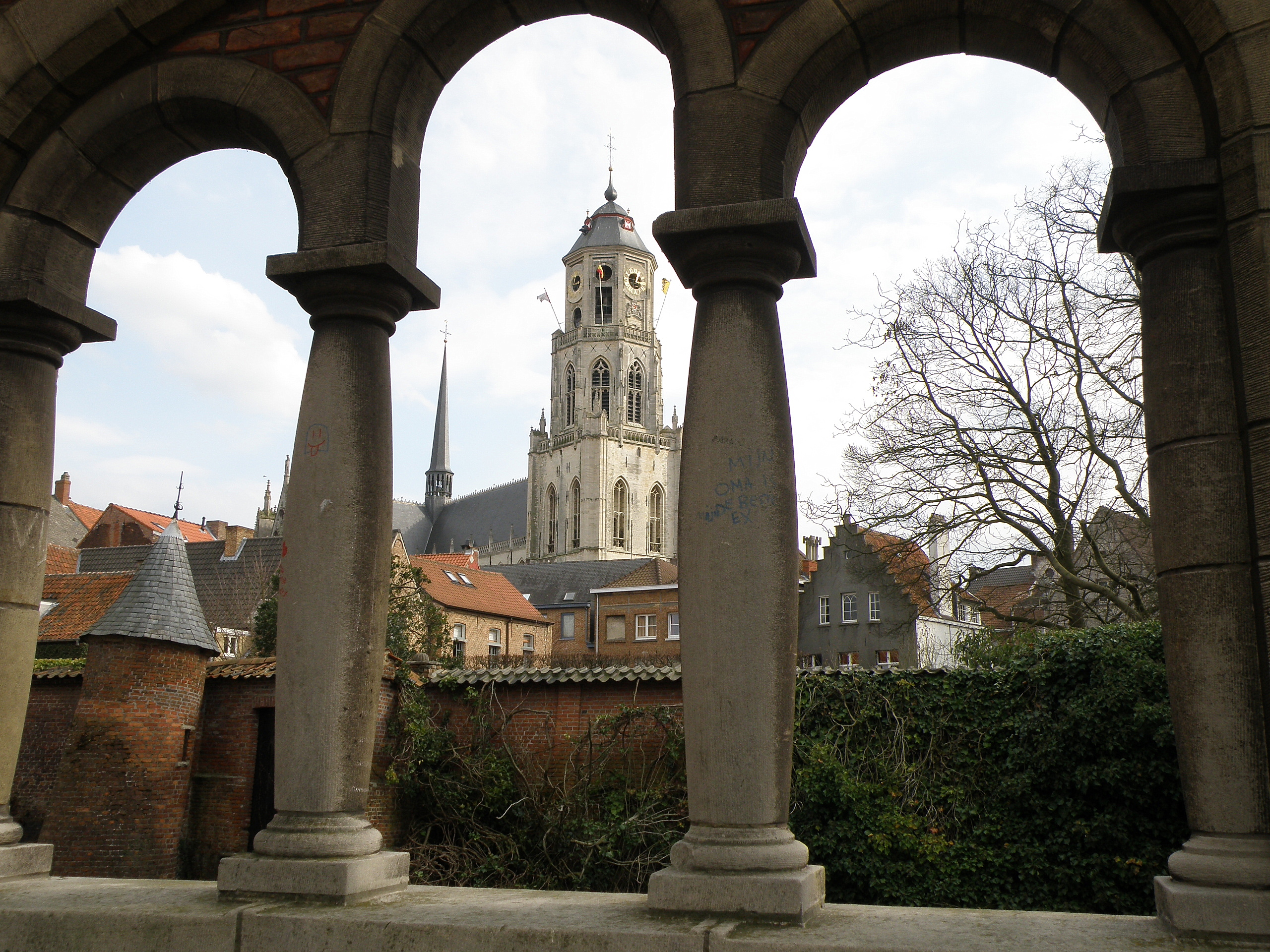
St. Gummarus Church (as seen from the fish market)

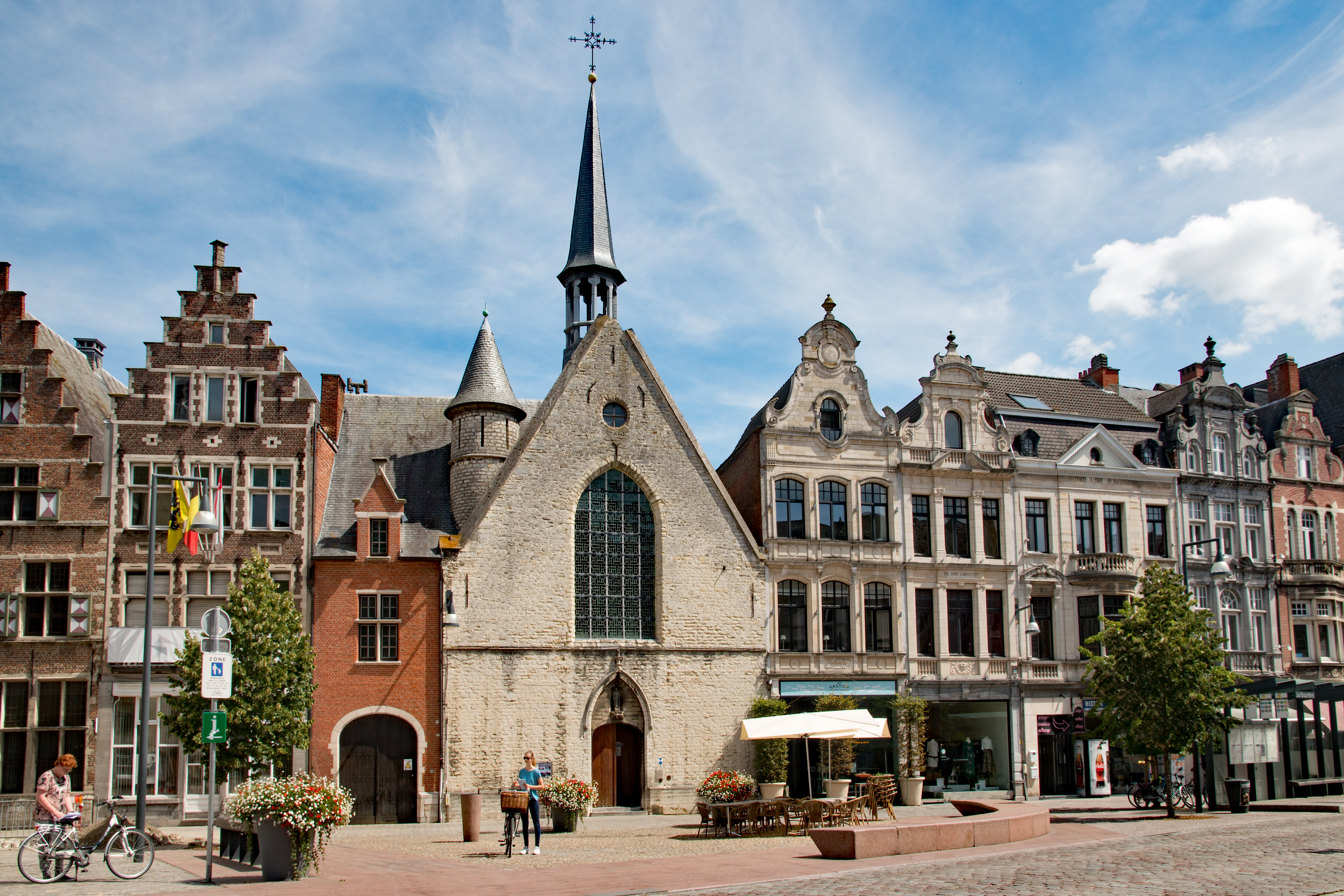
Main square

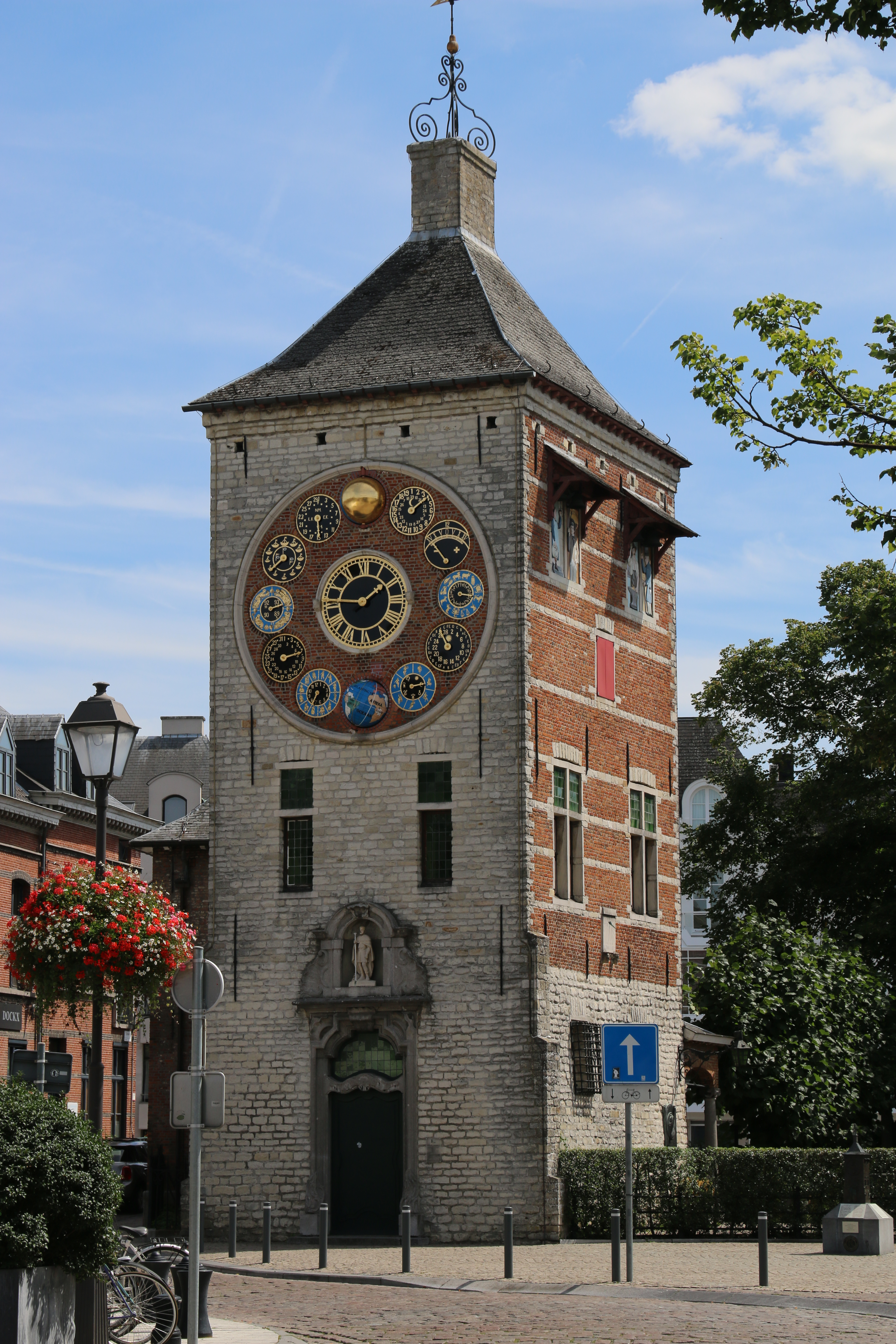
Zimmer Tower

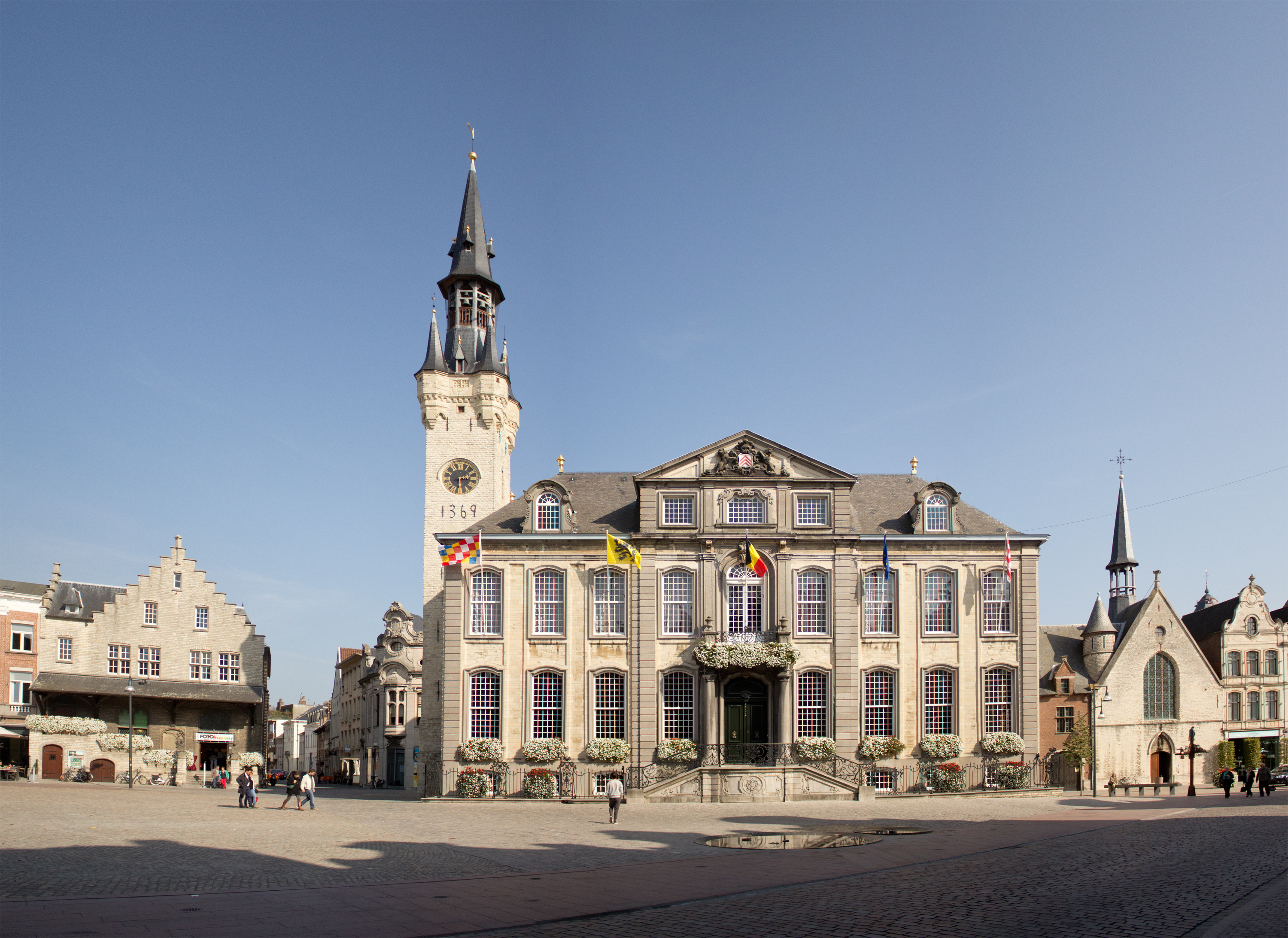
Town Hall and Belfry

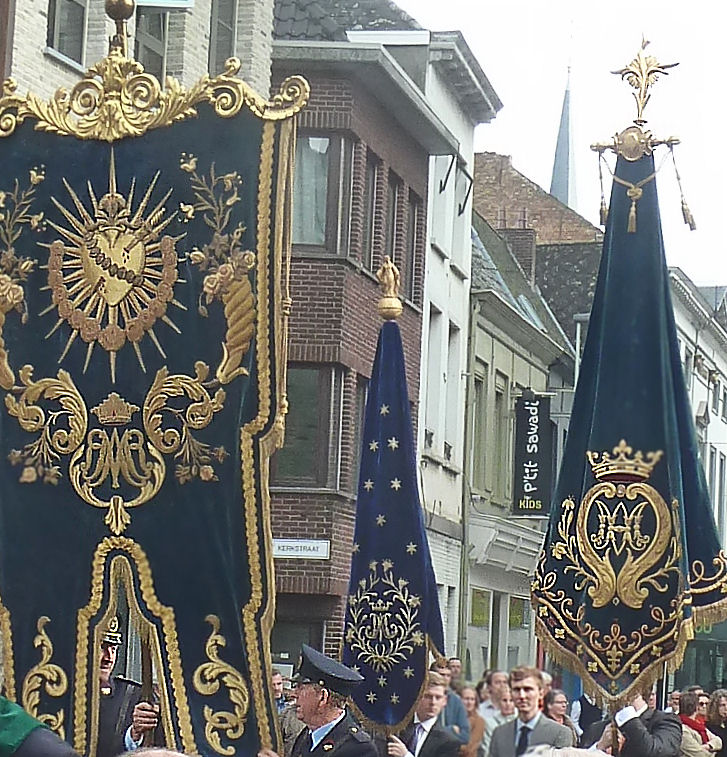
Annual Procession of Saint-Gummarus

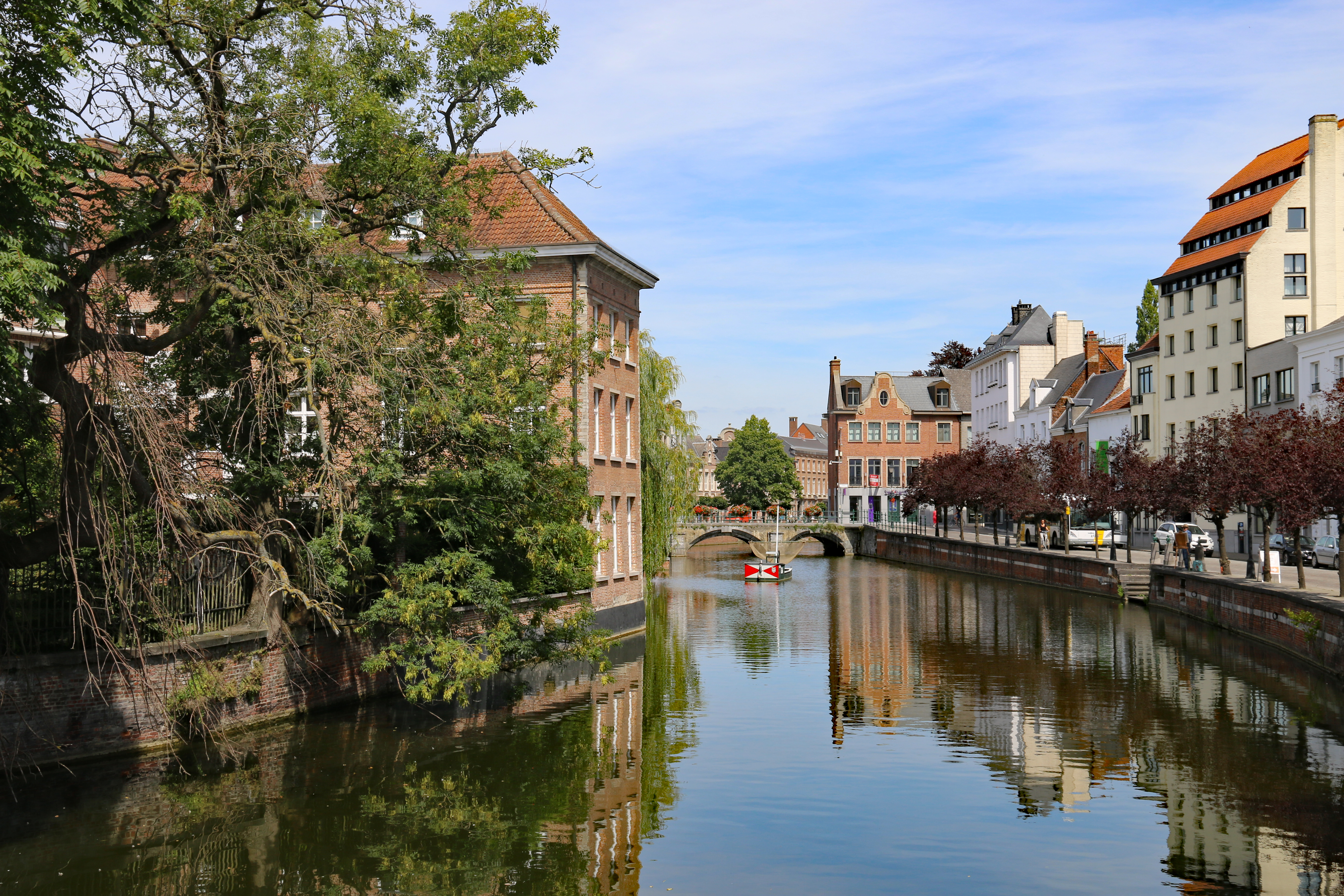

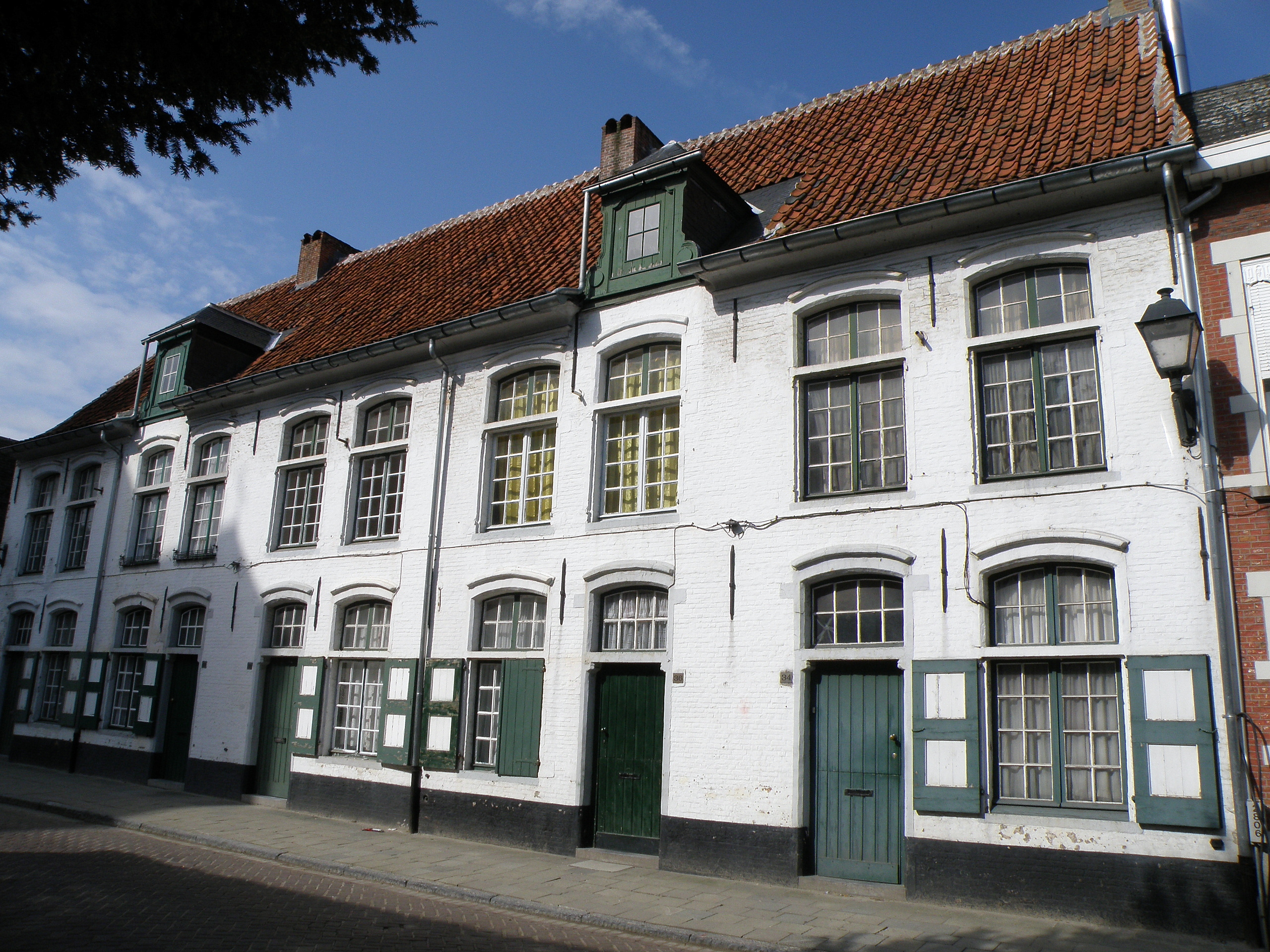
Town houses on Begijnhofstraat, built 1763 – 1778

== See also ==
- Lier mammoth
