= Adolf Hoste =

Flemish publisher

Adolphe Joseph Hoste (2 October 1846 – 9 June 1915) was a publisher in Ghent in the 19th century. Although he belonged to the French-speaking bourgeoisie, he was an early supporter of Flemish literature. He notably published much Flemish avant garde, such as Anton Bergmann and Novellen of Rosalie and Virginie Loveling. When the Flemish weekly Het Volksbelang was founded by Julius Vuylsteke, in 1867, he was one of the editors together with Julius Sabbe, Jozef Van Hoorde, and Julius De Vigne.

== See also ==
- Flemish literature

== Sources ==
- Anton Bergmann: een uitzondering?
