= Sabbe =

People with the surname Sabbe include:

- August Sabbe (1909–1978), one of the last surviving Estonian members of the Forest Brothers
- Julius Sabbe (1846–1910), Flemish publisher and parent of Maurits Sabbe
- Karel Sabbe (born 1989), Belgian ultrarunner
- Maurits Sabbe (1873–1938), Flemish writer and child of Julius Sabbe
- Noelle Sabbe, former French racing cyclist
- Osman Saleh Sabbe (1932–1987), Eritrean revolutionary
- Victor Sabbe (1906–1958), Belgian lawyer and liberal politician.
