= Vanderpoorten =

Vanderpoorten is a surname. Notable people with the surname include:

- Arthur Vanderpoorten (1884–1945), Belgian politician
- Herman Vanderpoorten (1922–1984), Belgian politician
- Marleen Vanderpoorten (born 1954), Belgian politician
- Vivimarie Vanderpoorten, Sri Lankan writer and poet
