= Julius Hoste =

Julius Hoste may refer to:

- Julius Hoste Sr. (1848-1933), Belgian writer and founder of Het Laatste Nieuws
- Julius Hoste Jr. (1884-1954), Belgian liberal politician
