= Van Brabant =

Van Brabant is a surname. Notable people with the surname include:

- Ozzie Van Brabant (born 1926), Canadian baseball player
- Piet Van Brabant (1932–2006), Belgian journalist
- Jozef Martin Paul van Brabant (1942–2006), Belgian economist
