= Liberaal Vlaams Verbond =

Flemish political organization

Logo Liberaal Vlaams Verbond

The Liberaal Vlaams Verbond (E: Liberal Flemish League) was founded in 1913. From its origin it wanted to promote the Flemish cause and drew attention to social matters, within the Belgian Liberal Party. Together with the Willemsfonds and the Liberaal Vlaams Studentenverbond, it is one of the Flemish liberal organizations.

== History ==
The first attempt to create an organization which brings together the Flemish liberal politicians, seems to have happened in 1908. Julius Hoste Sr., Pol De Mont, Max Rooses, and Maurits Basse were present at the meeting. In addition there were two liberal conferences for Flanders on 28 January 1912 and 5 October 1913. At the conference of 1913 it was decided that an organization would be founded to realise the program of the conference: liberal, Flemish and social. The first name which was proposed was Verbond van Vlaamsche Liberale Kiezerskorpsen and its first president was Emile De Puydt from Antwerp. The first general assembly convened on 16 October 1913, and on this occasion the name Liberaal Vlaams Verbond (LVV) was decided upon. One of its co-founders was Julius Hoste Sr. (1848–1933), the founder of the liberal newspaper Het Laatste Nieuws.

Over the years, several Flemish liberal politicians, were/are member of the LVV, such as Julius Hoste Sr., Karel Buls (1837–1914), Julius Hoste Jr. (1884–1954), Herman Teirlinck, Frans Grootjans, Willy De Clercq, to name a few.

== Members of the Board of Governors ==
=== President ===
- 1913: Emile De Puydt
- 1914: E. Stubbe
- 1919-1923: Jules Somers
- 1923-1926: Arthur Vanderpoorten
- 1926-1928: Jean Sach
- 1928-1934: Jules Boedt
- 1934-1940: Jules Somers
- 1945-1957: Victor Sabbe
- 1957-1966: Herman Vanderpoorten
- 1966-1967: Louis D'Haeseleer
- 1968: Karel Poma
- 1969-1972: Herman Vanderpoorten
- 1973-1974: Karel Poma
- 1974-1982: Louis Waltniel
- 1982-1993: Camille Paulus
- 1993- : Clair Ysebaert

=== Secretary ===
- 1913-1914: Leo Van Hoorick
- 1919-1923: Victor Heymans
- 1924-1947: Marcel Stijns
- 1948-1959: Piet Lenain
- 1960-1996: Piet Van Brabant
- 1996- : Oscar De Wandel

== Chief editor of Volksbelang ==
- 1960-1970: Piet Van Brabant
- 1971-1990: Frans Strieleman
- 1990-1996: Piet Van Brabant
- 1990-: Bert Cornelis

== See also ==
- Liberalism in Belgium
- Flemish movement
- Flemish Liberals and Democrats (VLD)
- Liberales
- Liberal Archive

== Sources ==
- P. Van Brabant, W. Blomme, Als een vuurtoren, 85 jaar Liberaal Vlaams Verbond, Liberaal Archief (1998)
