= Ysebaert =

Ysebaert is a surname. Notable people with the surname include:

- Clair Ysebaert (born 1950), Belgian politician
- Paul Ysebaert (born 1966), Canadian ice hockey player
