= Anton Bergmann =

Belgian Flemist activist, writer (1835–1874)

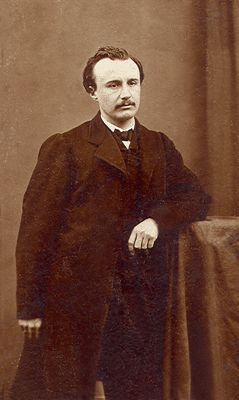
Anton Bergmann

Anton Bergmann (Lier, 29 June 1835 – Lier, 21 January 1874) was a Belgian writer and a liberal Flemish activist. Already during his youth he was fond of Dutch literature, and together with Julius Vuylsteke, he was a member of 't zal wel gaan, a Flemish cultural and liberal organization. After he graduated from humaniora (E: highschool), he went to the University of Ghent, where he obtained a bachelor's degree in literature, law and notary. Afterwards he attended the Vrije Hogeschool van Brussel (E: Free University of Brussels), where he obtained a doctorate in law in 1858. In the meantime he was very active as a writer and as an historian. He wrote a study on Philips van Marnix van Sint Aldegonde, plundering der hoofdkerk van Lier (E: Philips van Marnix van Sint Aldegonde, the looting of the main church of Lier). A Royal Decree of 17 June 1857 awarded to Anton Bergmann the five-year price of Dutch literatur for the period 1870–1874.

In 1858, he established himself as a lawyer in Lier, where he married Eliza Van Acker. His career as a lawyer left little time for writing, but he spent his spare time on literature and history. He became a member of the Flemish cultural organization the Willemsfonds, and he founded the weekly magazine De Lierenaar. In 1870, he published two Rijnlandsche novellen, and in 1873, he published his Geschiedenis van Lier (E: History of Lier). These publication were followed by Brigitta, Op St.-Niklaasdag, and Mariette la Bella. His frail health deteriorated while he was working on his magnum opus Ernest Staas, which he published under the pseudonym Tony. Ernest Staas was a success, and also his friend Nicolaas Beets (alias Hildebrand), whom he admired very much, was full of praise for his book. However, soon after its publication, Anton Bergmann died.

== Bibliography ==
- Philips van Marnix van Sint Aldegonde, plundering der hoofdkerk van Lier
- Twee Rijnlandsche novellen (1870)
- Brigitta (1873)
- Geschiedenis der Stad Lier (1873)
- Mariette la Bella (1873)
- Op St-Niklaasdag (1873)
- Ernest Staas, advocaat. Schetsen en beelden. (1874)
- Verspreide schetsen en novellen (1875)

== See also ==
- Flemish literature

== Sources ==
- Anton Bergmann (Dutch)
- Anton Bergmann (Dutch)
