= LVV =

LVV may refer to:

- Large vessel vasculitis, a medical condition
- Lëvizja Vetëvendosje, a Kosovar political party
- Liberaal Vlaams Verbond, a Flemish political organization
- Los Van Van, a Cuban music group
- LVV: The Real Rondon, an album by Darell
