= Julius De Vigne =

Belgian lawyer, politician and writer

Julius De Vigne (Ghent, 19 November 1844 – 1906) was a Belgian lawyer, politician and writer. He studied law at the University of Ghent and established himself as a lawyer. For several years, he was a member of the provincial - and municipal Council of Ghent. As a student at the university, he contributed to the student almanacs, published by the Flemish literary student organization 't zal wel gaan. When the Flemish weekly Het Volksbelang was founded by Julius Vuylsteke, in 1867, he was one of the editors together with Julius Sabbe, Jozef Van Hoorde, and Adolf Hoste.

In 1883 he was the primary supporter of the third Taalwet (E: language law), which stated that at the public schools and Royal Athenaea in Flanders, education would be preferably in Dutch instead of French.

== See also ==
- Flemish literature

== Bibliography ==
- Kiezers-handboek of uitleggingen op de Belgische kieswetten, Gent 1871
- Belgische kieswetboek van 18 Mei 1872, Nederlandsche vertaling met ophelderingen, Gent 1872
- De Zuidnederlandsche schrijvers van het tijdstip der Fransche Overheersching, Antw. 1873
- De wet op de jacht van 29 Maart 1873
- Reglement op de insectenvretende vogels, met Nederlandsche vertaling, Gent 1874
- De Staatswetten van België, (Grondwet, Provinciale wet, Gemeentewet, Kieswetboek), officiëele tekst met Nederlandsche vertaling, Gent 1874
- De Diensttijd in het Leger, Gent 1887.

== Sources ==
- De Vlaamsche beweging en de Vlaamsche Poëzie
- Julius De Vigne
