= Karel Poma =

Belgian politician (1920–2014)

- Born: Karel Emiel Hubert; 14 March 1920; Antwerp, Belgium
- Died: 27 December 2014 (aged 94); Wilrijk, Antwerp, Belgium

Karel Emiel Hubert, Baron Poma (14 March 1920 – 27 December 2014) was a Belgian liberal and politician for the PVV.

He was a son of Carolus Poma, who was a lieutenant of the Antwerp fire brigade, and subsequently council member (1946–1958) and mayor (1953–1958) of the town Wilrijk. He was married to Juliana Walgraeve, and together they had two children; a son Peter (b. 1950) and a daughter Kathleen (b. 1954).

== Education ==
Poma went to high school at the Royal Athenaeum of Antwerp, where he graduated in Latin-Sciences (1938). In 1943, he obtained a Licentiate in Sciences at the University of Ghent (Ghent, Belgium). In 1946, he obtained a PhD degree in science from the same university. He graduated as a bacteriologist at the Universite Libre de Bruxelles (ULB) in 1946. During World War II, he was active in the resistance against the Nazi occupation of Belgium, for which he was honored after the war.

== Professional career ==
Poma started his professional career in 1945 at the Antwerp Water Works (AWW) and became head of the laboratory of the AWW. He left the AWW in 1971, to be able to dedicate himself entirely to his political mandate. He was part-time docent environmental hygiene, for engineers and graduates of health care (physicians and nursing staff) at the Vrije Universiteit Brussel (1979–1990).

== Political career ==
From 1965 to 1985, Poma was a member of the Belgian parliament for the liberal party PVV. From 1965 to 1971 and 1981 to 1985, he was a senator. From 1971 to 1981, he was a member of parliament. From 1977 to 1981, he was floor leader for the PVV in the Culture Council and, from 1980 to 1981, of the Flemish Council.

Poma was twice a member of the executive:

- From 1974 to 1977 he was a secretary of state for the environment in the first government led by Leo Tindemans.
- From 1981 to 1985 Poma was a member of the Flemish Executive as its vice-chairman and minister for culture, media, sport, youth and research and development.

From 1976 to 1982, he was a member of the village council of Wilrijk; and 1982 to 1988, a member of the city council of Antwerp (Wilrijk became a part of Antwerp in 1982). In 1968 and from 1973 to 1974, he was president of the Liberaal Vlaams Verbond (LVV).

== Honours ==
- Knighted by King Albert II
- 8 July 2005: created baron by royal decree.
- Belgium: 7 December 2009: minister of state
- Belgium: Grand cross in the Order of Leopold II
- Belgium: Grand Officer in the Order of Leopold
- Greece: Grand Officer in the Order of the Phoenix

== Bibliography ==
- Wat men moet weten over het Belgisch liberalisme (1954), together with Frans Janssens
- Knoeien met ons Leefmilieu (1973)
- Energie en Democratie (1976)
- Actie Vrijmetselaren, een politieke benadering van de moderne vrijmetselarij (1996)
- Een visie op de Grote Architect van het Heelal (1999)
- De Verlichting. Pijler van onze beschaving (2009)

== Sources ==
- Karel Poma
