= Clair Ysebaert =

Belgian politician

Clair Robert Ysebaert (b. Oudenaarde, 4 April 1950) is a Belgian politician and the president of the Liberaal Vlaams Verbond, a Flemish organization within the Belgian Liberal Party, since 1993. He holds a master's degree in diplomatic sciences.

== Career ==
Ysebaert obtained a Master's degree Diplomacy at the University of Ghent in 1972.

After having worked for a short period at the VRT, the public Flemish broadcaster, Ysebaert joined the cabinet of the liberal minister of National Education Herman De Croo from 1974 to 1977. When the Liberals subsequently ended up in the opposition, Ysebaert started working for the Party for Freedom and Progress (PVV) at the study service and later as spokesperson. From 1985 to 1989 Ysebaert became chief of staff for Frans Grootjans, Guy Verhofstadt and Ward Beysen. Afterwards, he held several board positions at NMBS, SABENA and Het Laatste Nieuws, among others. From 2001 to 2014 he was chairman of the PMV Board of Directors. He has been a board member at Crelan since 2007. Clair Ysebaert remained active within Open VLD all that time. From 1988 to 2001 he was General Party Secretary and since 1992 he has been a continuous member of the extended party board.

== Sources ==
- Clair Ysebaert (Liberal Archive)
- E. Coppens, P. Coppens, Wie is wie in Vlaanderen 2003-2005. Biografische encyclopedie, Hove, Lexycon, 2003, p. 1379.
- Clair Ysebaert (Dutch Wiki)
