= Frans Strieleman =

Belgian journalist and editor

Frans Lodewijk Strieleman (7 November 1926 in Antwerp – 29 January 1999 in Aartselaar) was a Belgian journalist, chief editor of the De Nieuwe Gazet, chief editor of the Volksbelang and the De Vlaamse Gids.

== Sources ==
- Frans Strieleman
- R. De Schryver, B; De Wever, et al., Nieuwe Encyclopedie van de Vlaamse Beweging, Tielt-Utrecht, Lannoo, 1998, 3 vol., p. 2875.
