= Maurits Basse =

Belgian teacher and writer

Maurits Basse (5 September 1868 – 18 February 1944) was a Belgian writer and teacher, one of the founders of the Liberaal Vlaams Verbond.

Basse was born at Ledeberg. He became a professor at the University of Ghent, where he remained until his death. He was editor of the journal Het Volksbelang and of the De Vlaamse Gids.

== Bibliography ==
- Maurits Basse, Stijlaffectatie Bij Shakespeare, Kessinger Publishing, LLC (1895)
- Maurits Basse, Het Aandeel der Vrouw in de Nederlandse Letterkunde, Deel I, Gent, Uitgevers- en Boekdrukkershuis AD. Hoste (1920)
- Maurits Basse, Het Aandeel der Vrouw in de Nederlandse Letterkunde, Deel II, Gent, Uitgevers- en Boekdrukkershuis AD. Hoste (1921)
- Maurits Basse, De Vlaamsche beweging van 1905 tot 1930, Volume 1, Van Rysselbergh & Rombaut, (1930)
- Maurits Basse, De 'Gedichten van den Schoolmeester
- Maurits Basse, Ingoldsby Legends
- Maurits Basse, Frederick van Jenuen en Cymbeline

== Sources ==
- Maurits Basse (Liberal Archive)
- Luykx, Th. (Ed.), Rijksuniversiteit Gent, Liber Memorialis 1913-1960, Ghent, 1960, Vol. IV, pp. 384–385.
