= Jules Boedt =

Belgian lawyer and politician

- Born: Jules Charles Stanislas Boedt; 3 July 1884; Bruges, Belgium
- Died: 2 October 1966 (aged 82); Beernem, Belgium
- Occupations: politician, lawyer

Jules Charles Stanislas Boedt (3 July 1884 – 2 October 1966) was a Flemish-Belgian lawyer and liberal politician.

He was a municipal council member in Bruges, a member of the Belgian parliament, and president of the Liberaal Vlaams Verbond (1928–1934).

== Sources ==
- Jules Boedt
- Van Causenbroeck, B., Nieuwe Encyclopedie van de Vlaamse Beweging, Tielt-Utrecht, Lannoo, 1998, 3 vol., pp. 522–523.
