= Herman Vanderpoorten =

Belgian politician

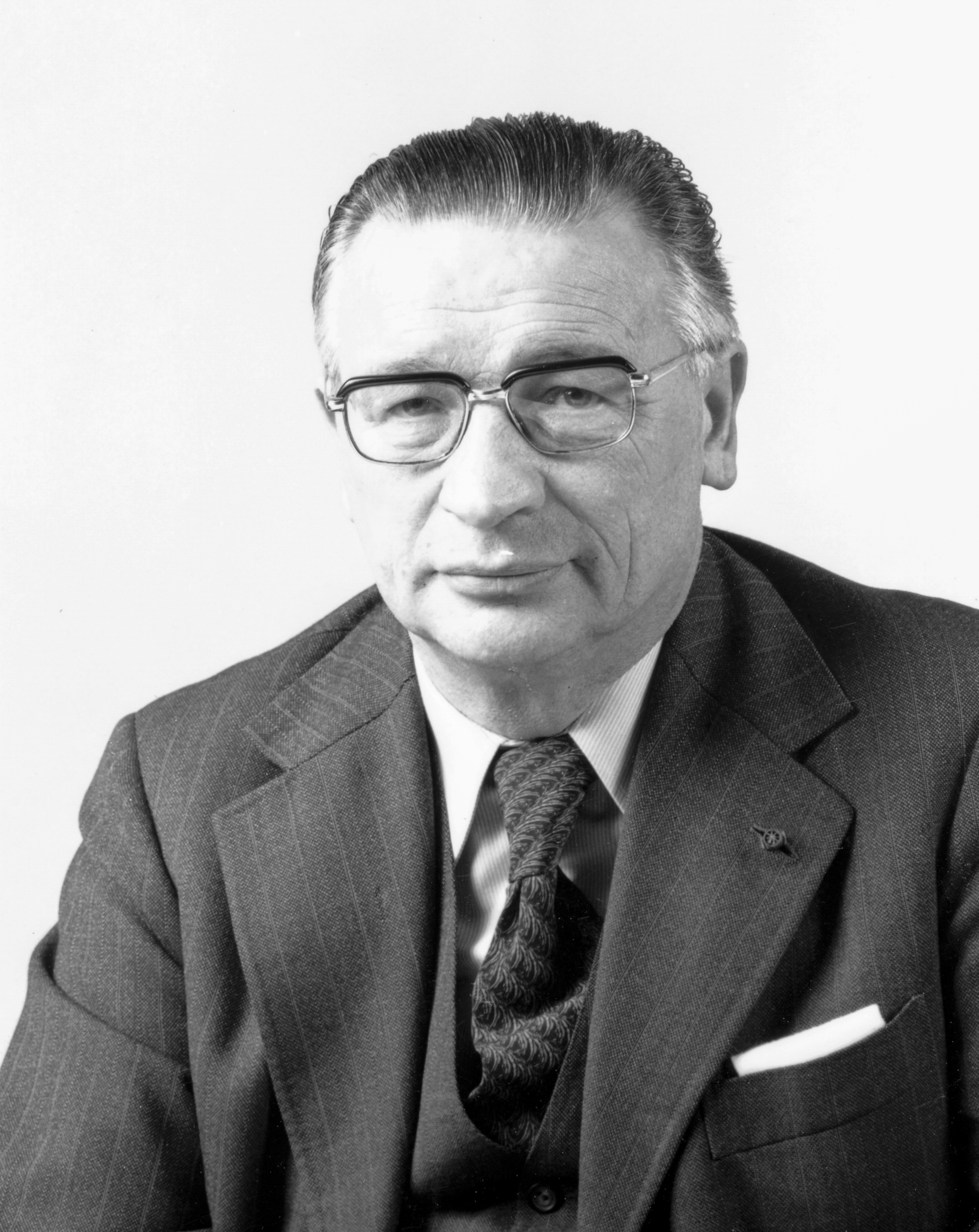
- Born: Herman Frans Gerard Vanderpoorten; 25 August 1922; Lier, Belgium
- Died: 3 September 1984 (aged 62); Lier, Belgium
- Occupation: Politician

Herman Frans Geeraard Vanderpoorten (Dutch: [ˈɦɛrmɑɱ vɑndərˈpoːrtə(n)]; 25 August 1922 – 3 September 1984) was a Belgian liberal politician. He was a son of the politician Arthur Vanderpoorten, the father of Marleen Vanderpoorten and an uncle of Patrick Dewael.

== Education ==
He obtained a law degree at the University of Ghent and got acquainted with, among others, Frans Grootjans and Karel Poma.

== Career ==
After World War II he followed his father's footsteps, who had died in the Nazi concentration camp of Bergen-Belsen. From 1949 up to 1958 he was province council member in Antwerp. In 1961, he became a member of parliament and in 1965, he changed to the senate where he remained until his death. Vanderpoorten led several ministries during his political career. For the PVV-PLP, he was minister of internal affairs in the government Paul Vanden Boeynants-Willy De Clercq (1966–1968), minister of justice in the government Edmond Leburton (1973–1974), in the government Leo Tindemans-II (1974–1977) and in the government Wilfried Martens-III (1980) and in addition vice-prime minister and minister for institutional reforms in that same government. In 1979, he took part in the first direct European elections and was member of the European Parliament in Strasbourg up to 1980. In 1983, he was appointed by the king as Minister of State. He was burgomaster of Lier (1982–1984). He was president of the Liberaal Vlaams Verbond (1957–1966, 1969–1973).

== Honours ==
- 4 November 1971 : Commander in the Order of Leopold.
- 7 December 1978 : Knight Grand Cross in the Order of Leopold II.
- 5 November 1981 : Knight Grand Cross in the Order of the Crown.

== Sources ==
- Wouters, Nico, Vanderpoorten Herman, in Nieuwe Encyclopedie van de Vlaamse Beweging, Tielt, Lannoo, 1998, dl. 3, pp. 3159–3160
- Herman Vanderpoorten
