= Jozef Van Hoorde =

Flemish writer

Jozef van Hoorde (12 October 1843, Ghent – 1 June 1916) was a Flemish writer. He first went to the local school (stadsschool) and then to high school at the Koninklijk Athenaeum (E:Royal Athenaeum) in Ghent.

In 1862, he became assistant teacher, but he resigned in 1866, and in 1867 became clerk, of the Gentschen Mercurius after he had been subeditor of the paper Commerce de Gand and an editor of Het Volksbelang. When the Flemish weekly Het Volksbelang was founded in 1867, by Julius Vuylsteke, he was one of the editors together with Julius Sabbe, Julius De Vigne, and Adolf Hoste. In 1870, he became an editor of the Gazette van Gent. He wrote contributions to several illustrated magazines and journals.

== See also ==
- Flemish literature

== Bibliography ==
- Zielenadel (1869) (pseudonym Paul van Elen), together with B. Block (theatre play)
- Nijd en Hoogmoed (1871) (pseudonym Paul van Elen), together with B. Block (theatre play)
- De Stiefdochter (1872) (pseudonym Paul van Elen), together with B. Block (theatre play)
- Huwt de vrouw van uw hart (1872)
- Twee Vrouwenbeelden (1872)
- De verstootene Dochter (1872)
- Een woord over de strekking van het Nederlandsch Tooneel (1872)
- Victors Nichtje (1874) (together with Em. van Goethem) (theatre play, with music)
- J.B.J. Hofman, van Kortrijk, zijn Leven en zijne Werken (1876)
- Een strijd tusschen Twee (1876) (theatre play)
- Quinten Metsijs (1877) (theatre play)
- Baekelandt (1877) (theatre play)
- Het Droomboek (1879) (theatre play)
- De Tehuiskomst (1881) (theatre play)
- Vrouwe Courtmans-Berchmans, Haar leven en werken (14 May 1883)
- Mevrouw Katrien (1884) (theatre play)
- Levensschets van Dr. Jozef Guislain (1887)

== Sources ==
- Biography in Biographisch woordenboek der Noord- en Zuidnederlandsche letterkunde (1888–1891)
