= Louis D'Haeseleer =

- Born: Lodewijk Benoît D'Haeseleer; 20 October 1911; Haaltert, Belgium
- Died: 12 August 1988 (aged 76); Aalst, Belgium
- Occupations: Politician, clerk

Louis (Lodewijk) Benoît D'Haeseleer (20 October 1911 – 12 August 1988) was a Belgian clerk and liberal politician.

He was the president-founder of the Liberale Sociale Werken of Aalst. He was alderman and burgomaster of Aalst, member of the provincial council of East Flanders, a member of the Belgian parliament, and president of the Liberaal Vlaams Verbond (1966–1967).

== Sources ==
- Louis D'Haeseleer
- G. Coppens, G. Van den Eede, De geschiedenis van de Liberale Partij te Aalst 1846-2002, Aalst, Gaston Van den Eede, 2003, p. 71-97, 179–180.
