= Rosalie Loveling =

Flemish author

- Born: 20 March 1834; Nevele, Belgium
- Died: 4 May 1875 (aged 41); Nevele, Belgium
- Occupations: essayist, novelist, poet

Rosalie Loveling (20 March 1834 – 4 May 1875) was a Flemish author of poetry, novels, and essays.

== Biography ==
Rosalie Loveling was born in Nevele, Belgium, and was the older sister of Virginie Loveling, also an author, with whom she co-wrote part of her oeuvre. After the death of their father Herman Loveling, the family moved to Ghent where the sisters moved in circles of French-speaking, mainly anti-clerical intelligentsia before eventually returning to Nevele.

She made her literary debut influenced by Klaus Groth, whose 'Trinia' she translated into Dutch. Together with her sister, she went on to write realistic and descriptive poetry with a romantic undertone. They also published two collections of essays on life in the rural communities as well as the city bourgeoisie.

Rosalie Loveling died on 4 May 1875 in Nevele.

== Bibliography ==
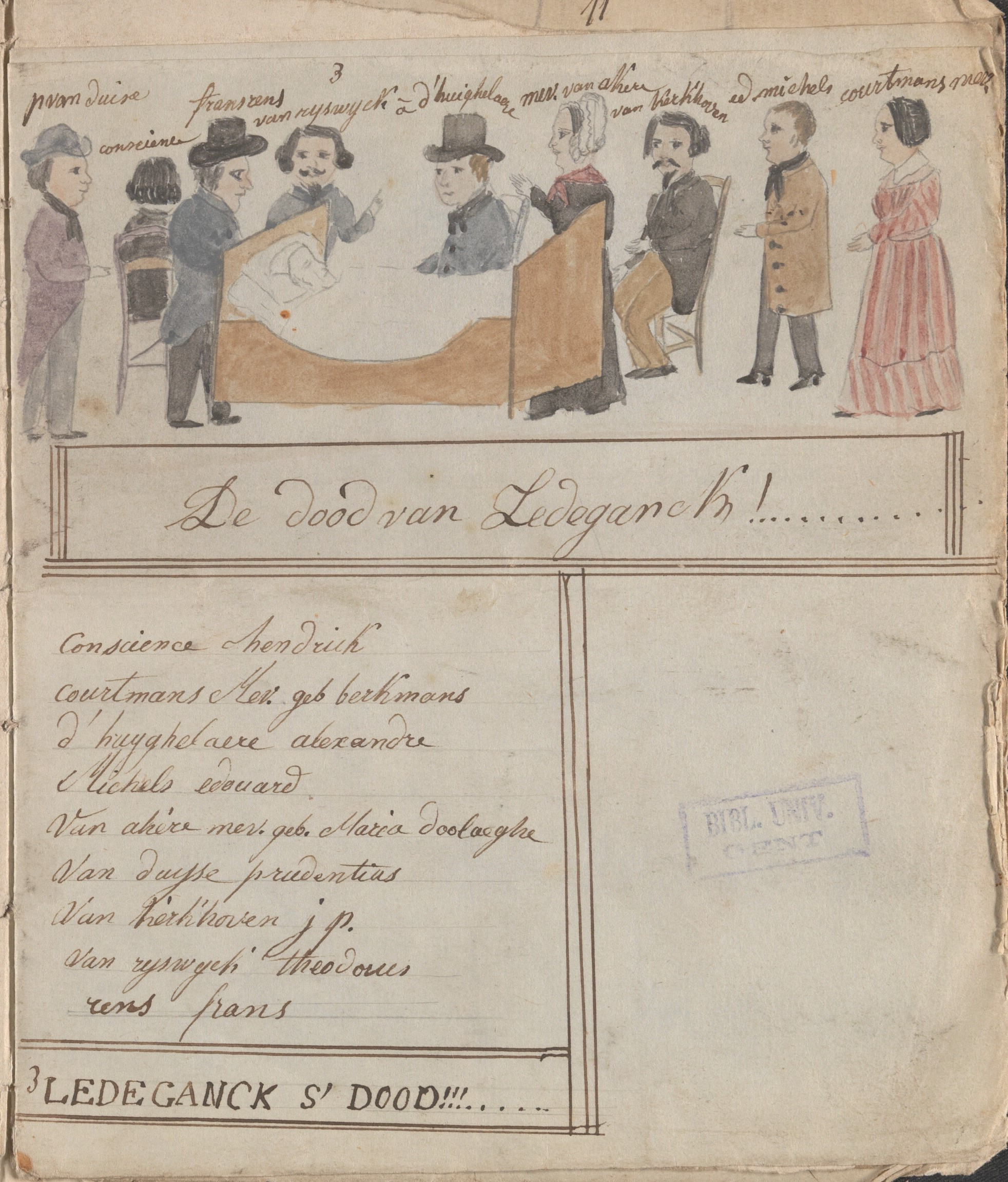
Excerpt from a manuscript with sketches, novels and translations of poetry. Written by Rosalie and Virginie Loveling in the 19th century.

=== Co-authored with Virginie Loveling ===
- Gedichten (1870)
- Novellen (1874) Rosalie : Jan-oom en Belle-Trezeken, De baan der kunst, Serafine, Broeder en zuster, Meester Huyghe ; Virginie: Drie kleine schetsen, Sidon, In de Hope van Vrede, De verdwaalden, Emiliaantje
- Nieuwe novellen (1876) Rosalie: Mijnheer Daman en zijn erfgenamen, Juffrouw Leocadie Stevens, Po en Paoletto ; Virginie: Octavie en Estelle, De kwellende gedachte, De vijftig franken
- Polydoor en Theodoor en andere novellen en schetsen (1883) Virginie: Polydoor en Theodoor ; Rosalie: De hond, Uwe tweede vrouw, Het eenig kind, De gierigheid, Kinderverdriet, Onbehendige troostwoorden, Iets over het onderwijs der vrouw, Beloften en bedreigingen, Mijn verre neef
- Onze Rensen (1950)
- Niets is onbeduidend (compilation and commentary by A. Van Elslander, 1978)

=== Sole author ===
- Vreest gij niet (1853)
- Trinia, translated from Klaus Groth's work (1864)
- Het licht op oog (1866)
- De eerst opvoeding (1863)
- Het meesterschap (1868)
- Het geschenk

== See also ==
- Flemish literature
