= Julius Vuylsteke =

Belgian liberal politician and writer

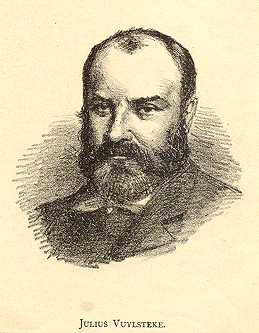
Julius Vuylsteke (by Willem Steelink Jr.)

Julius Vuylsteke (Ghent, 10 November 1836 – Ghent, 16 January 1903) was a Belgian liberal politician and writer. He started his career as a lawyer, but later opened a bookshop. As a liberal Flemish politician, he founded the liberal association 't zal wel gaan, and he played an important role in the Flemish movement. Julius Vuylsteke promoted cultural cooperation of Flanders with the Netherlands. He became President of the Willemsfonds, and after his political career he gave his attention mainly to the history of Flanders. In 1867, he founded the Flemish weekly Het Volksbelang, which appeared for the first time on 12 January 1867. In 1867, Julius De Vigne was one of the editors together with Julius Sabbe, Jozef Van Hoorde, and Adolf Hoste.

Julius Vuylsteke wrote romantic Flemish nationalistic poems, while he was still a student, which were published in Zwijgende liefde (1860) and Uit het studentenleven en andere gedichten (1868). In 1903, after his death, his political essays and poems were published in Klauwaard en Geus.

== Honours ==
- 1900:Knight in the Order of Leopold.

== Bibliography ==
- Zwijgende liefde (1860)
- Le question flamande et le libéralisme (1861)
- Uit het studentenleven en andere gedichten (1868)
- Verzamelde gedichten (1881)
- Verzamelde prozastukken (1887–1891)
- Oorkondenboek van de stad Gent, dl. 1 (1900)
- Klauwaard en Geus (1905)

== See also ==
- Flemish literature

== Sources ==
- Julius Vuylsteke
