= Arthur Vanderpoorten =

Belgian politician

- Born: Arthur Pieter Frans Vanderpoorten; 17 February 1884; Puurs, Belgium
- Died: 3 April 1945 (aged 61); Bergen-Belsen concentration camp, Nazi Germany
- Occupation: politician

Arthur Pieter Frans Vanderpoorten (17 February 1884 – 3 April 1945) was a Belgian liberal politician and minister. Vanderpoorten was the father of the later minister Herman Vanderpoorten and the grandfather of the later ministers Patrick Dewael and Marleen Vanderpoorten.

== Career ==
Vanderpoorten was executive-director of a company. He became president of the Liberaal Vlaams Verbond (E: Liberal Flemish League) and was liberal senator (1936–1944). Vanderpoorten was minister of public work and reduction of unemployment (1939) and of internal affairs (1940). At the invasion of the German troops in 1940, Vanderpoorten followed the government in exile to France, but did not follow along to London. Because Vichy France was occupied by German troops in November 1942, Vanderpoorten's freedom was strongly restricted. He was apprehended in January 1943, on suspicion of assistance to an escape line for refugees to the United Kingdom. He was deported to Germany and died less than two weeks before the British troops liberated the Bergen-Belsen concentration camp.

== See also ==
- Liberalism in Belgium

== Sources ==
- Royal Atheneum Herman Vanderpoorten
- Arthur Vanderpoorten
