= Jozef M. van Brabant =

Belgian economist

- Born: Jozef Martin Paul van Brabant; 5 November 1942; Hasselt, Belgium
- Died: 18 October 2006 (aged 63); Stanardsville, Virginia, United States
- Citizenship: Belgium
- Education: Katholieke Universiteit van Leuven (Lic.); Belgium; Yale University (M.A.), (Ph.D.)
- Occupation: Economist
- Employer(s): United Nations Secretariat, New York
- Spouse: Miyuki van Brabant née Yokoyama (m. 1968–2006)
- Children: Katja J. Stevens (née Brabant); Anja J. Smith (née Brabant)
- Parent(s): Leon Elise van Brabant (father); Victorina van Brabant (née Jeral) (mother)

Jozef Martin Paul van Brabant (5 November 1942 – 18 October 2006) was a Belgian economist. He was Principal Economic Affairs Officer at the Secretariat of the United Nations in New York. His major academic interest had been in the economics of the planned and transition economies of Eastern Europe and in the economic aspects of the remaking Europe.

== Life ==
Jozef Van Brabant was born on 5 November 1942 in Hasselt, Belgium to Leon Elise and Victorina (née Jeral) van Brabant. After completing his undergraduate studies in business, economics, philosophy, mathematics and teaching at the Katholieke Universiteit van Leuven in Belgium, Jozef M. van Brabant went to the US and received a M.A. degree in Russian and Eastern European Studies in 1967 and a Ph.D. degree in Economics from Yale University in 1973.

After a brief academic career in Belgium and Germany he joined the United Nations Secretariat in New York in 1975 and retired in the first years of the 21st century as one of its Principal Economic Affairs Officers. He was noted for his quasi-academic career, which included delivering lectures and participation in conferences in Europe, America and Asia. He also taught at the European University Institute in Florence, Italy. Jozef van Brabant was widely regarded as economic expert on Eastern Europe. In his free time he wrote and published extensively on the centrally planned economies in Eastern Europe, their so-called annus mirabilis of 1989, their transition to market economies and integration with the European Union. Van Brabant was the author of seventeen books and more than 200 articles in American and European academic journals and collected volumes.

Van Brabant never became a US citizen and was a staunch supporter of European integration. He was survived by his wife, Miyuki van Brabant (née Yokoyama), a retired librarian, two daughters, and four grandchildren.

== Selected bibliography ==
- Brabant, Jozef van (1973). Bilateralism and Structural Bilateralism in Intra-CMEA Trade (1 ed.). Rotterdam: Rotterdam University Press – via Internet Archive.
- — (1974). Essays on planning, trade and integration in Eastern Europe (1 ed.). Rotterdam University Press. ISBN 978-90-237-2251-9 – via Internet Archive.
- — (1977). East European Cooperation: the Role of Money and Finance (1 ed.). New York: Praeger. ISBN 978-0-275-56650-0 – via Internet Archive.
- — (1980). Socialist Economic Integration : Aspects of Contemporary Economic Problems in Eastern Europe (1 ed.). Cambridge (England); New York (NY): Cambridge University Press. ISBN 978-0-521-23046-9 – via Internet Archive.
- — (1987). Adjustment, Structural Change and Economic Efficiency – Aspects of Monetary Cooperation in Eastern Europe (1 ed.). Cambridge (England) and New York: Cambridge University Press. ISBN 978-0-521-33455-6 – via Internet Archive.
- — (1987). Regional Price Formation in Eastern Europe: Theory and Practice of Trade Pricing (1 ed.). Dordrecht (The Netherlands); Boston (MA): Kluwer Academic Publishers – via Internet Archive.
- — (1989). Economic Integration in Eastern Europe – A Handbook (1 ed.). Hemel Hempstead (England) and New York: Harvester Wheatsheaf and Routledge. ISBN 978-0-415-90235-9 – via Internet Archive.
- — (1990). Remaking Eastern Europe: On the Political Economy of Transition (1 ed.). Dordrecht (The Netherlands); Boston (MA): Kluwer Academic Publishers – via Internet Archive.
- — (1991). The Planned Economies and International Economic Organizations (1 ed.). Cambridge (England), New York (NY): Cambridge University Press. ISBN 978-0-521-38350-9 – via Internet Archive.
- — (1991). Integrating Eastern Europe into the Global Economy – Convertibility Through a Payments Union (1 ed.). Dordrecht, Boston, MA, and London: Kluwer Academic Publishers. ISBN 978-0-7923-1352-6 – via Internet Archive.
- — (1992). Privatizing Eastern Europe : the Role of Markets and Ownership in the Transition (1 ed.). Dordrecht (The Netherlands); Boston (MA): Kluwer Academic Publishers. ISBN 978-0-7923-1861-3 – via Internet Archive.
- van Brabant, Jozef M., ed. (1993). The New Eastern Europe and the World Economy (1 ed.). Boulder, Colorado: Westview Press. ISBN 978-0-8133-1523-2 – via Internet Archive.
- — (1993). Industrial Policy in Eastern Europe - Governing the Transition (1 ed.). Dordrecht (The Netherlands); Boston (MA): Kluwer Academic Publishers. ISBN 978-0-7923-2538-3 – via Internet Archive.
- — (1995). The Transformation of Eastern Europe - Joining the European Integration Movement (1 ed.). Commack, NY: Nova Science Publishers – via Internet Archive.
- — (1996). Integrating Europe - The Transition Economies at Stake (1 ed.). Dordrecht (The Netherlands); Boston (MA), London: Kluwer Academic Publishers – via Internet Archive.
- — (1998). The Political Economy of Transition: Coming to Grips with History and Methodology (1 ed.). London and New York: Routledge. ISBN 0-415-16946-1 – via Internet Archive.
- Brabant, Jozef M. van, ed. (1999). Remaking Europe: The European Union and the Transition Economies (1 ed.). Lanham, Boulder, New York, Oxford: Rowman & Littlefield Publishers Inc. ISBN 9780847693245 – via Internet Archive.
