= Piet Van Brabant =

Piet Van Brabant (Schaerbeek, 11 March 1932 – Jette, 6 July 2006) was a Belgian journalist, editor of the journal Het Laatste Nieuws, chief editor of the weekly Het Volksbelang, and general secretary of the Liberaal Vlaams Verbond (1960–1996).

== Bibliography ==
- De Vrijmetselaars: reguliere loges in België (1990), Uitgeverij Hadewijch, ISBN 90-5240-058-X
- Lexicon van de Loge, handboek voor vrijmetselaars (1993), Uitgeverij Hadewijch, ISBN 90-5240-191-8
- In het hart van de Loge: Riten, symbolen en inwijdingen (1995), Uitgeverij Hadewijch, ISBN 90-5240-323-6
- P. Van Brabant, W. Blomme, Als een vuurtoren, 85 jaar Liberaal Vlaams Verbond, (1998) Liberaal Archief
- De Christelijke wortels van de Vrijmetselarij (2001), Uitgeverij Houtekiet, ISBN 90-5240-626-X
- De Vrijmetselarij in Nederland en Vlaanderen (2003), Uitgeverij Houtekiet, ISBN 90-5240-714-2
- De spiritualiteit van de Vrijmetselaar (2006), Uitgeverij Houtekiet, ISBN 90-5240-889-0

== Sources ==
- Piet Van Brabant (Liberal Archive)
- Vandewalle, E., Encyclopedie van de Vlaamse Beweging, Tielt-Utrecht, Lannoo, 1973, 2 vols., p. 224.
