= Julius Sabbe =

Flemish publisher

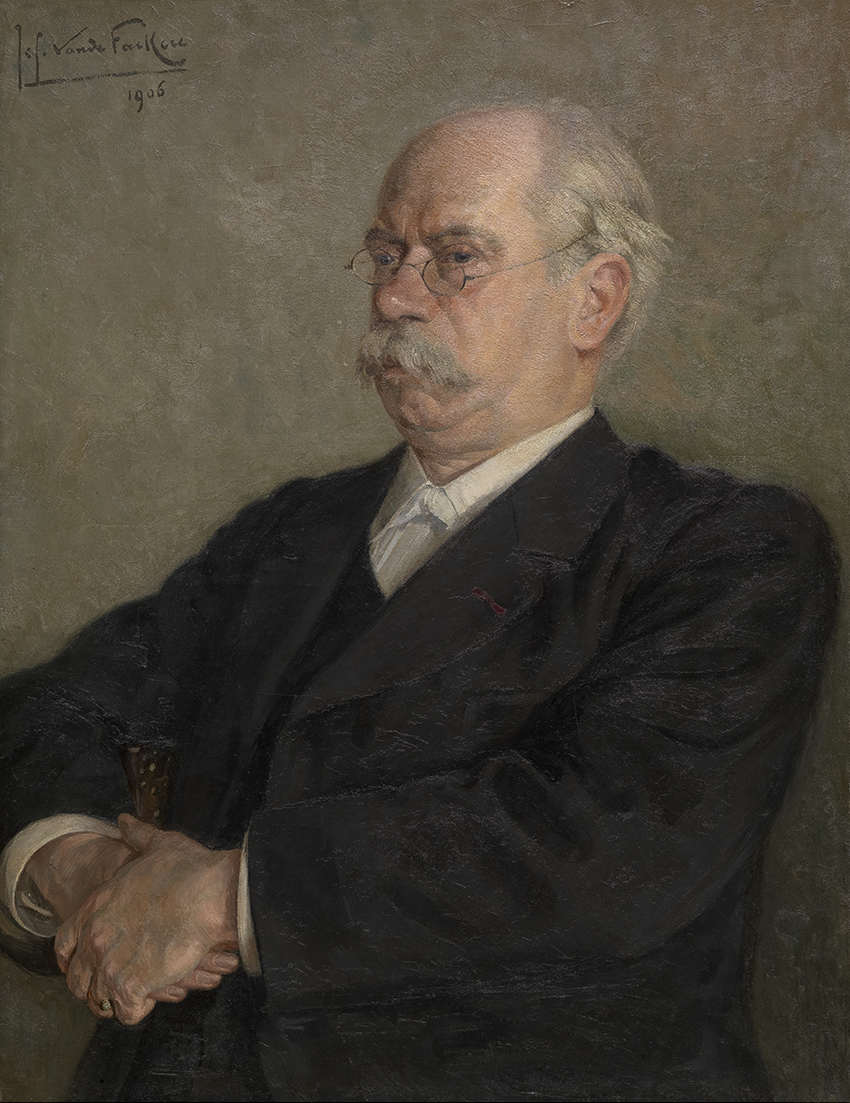
- Born: 14 February 1846; Ghent
- Died: 3 July 1910; Bruges
- Education: Ghent University
- Occupations: Writer, school teacher (1869–), journalist, literary scholar
- Employer: Koninklijk Atheneum Brugge (1869–)
- Children: Maurits Sabbe

Julius Ludovicus Maria Sabbe (14 February 1846 – 3 July 1910) was a Flemish publisher and an active member of the Flemish movement. From 24 September 1869 on, he taught Dutch at the Koninklijk Atheneum (E: Royal Atheneum) of Bruges.

Between 1874 and 1881, he published the monthly magazine De Halletoren, which was succeeded by the liberal magazine Brugsche Beiaard, of which he was the editor, from 1881 up to 1910. He was a staunch supporter of the creation of a seaport for Bruges. When the Flemish weekly Het Volksbelang was founded in 1867, by Julius Vuylsteke, he was one of the editors together with Jozef Van Hoorde, Julius De Vigne, and Adolf Hoste. In 1877 he was awarded by the Royal Academy of Belgium for his cantata Klokke Roelandt. He took the initiative for the creation of a statue for Jan Breydel and Pieter de Coninck, which was inaugurated in 1887. He was the father of Maurits Sabbe.

== Bibliography ==
- Eenige mannenbeelden (Ghent, 1870)
- Het nationaal beginsel in de Vlaamsche schilderkunst (Ghent, 1874)
- De Taal is gansch het Volk, speech (Antwerp, 1875)
- Groot en Klein, speech (Ghent, 1876)
- Help u zelven, speech (Antwerp, 1877)
- De Klokke Roeland, cantata (Bruges, 1877)
- Brugge's ontwaking, van Eyck's-cantata (Bruges, 1878)
- Grootmoedersvertelboek, by Julius Sabbe and A. Vermast (Bruges, 1883)

== See also ==
- Flemish literature
