= Maurits Sabbe =

Flemish man of letters and educator

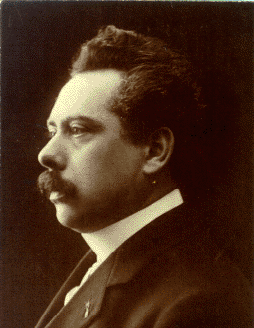
Maurits Sabbe (1924)

Maurits Sabbe, born Maurice Charles Marie Guillaume Sabbe (Bruges, 9 February 1873 – Antwerp, 12 February 1938), was a Flemish man of letters and educator who became curator of the Plantin-Moretus Museum in Antwerp.

== Life ==
He was a son of Julius Sabbe and the eldest of seven children. He grew up in Bruges, going to school there, and studied philology at the University of Ghent, obtaining a doctorate in 1896 with a thesis on Jan Luyken. He became a secondary school teacher, working at a number of different establishments. In 1899 he married Gabriëlla De Smet. From 1903 to 1919 he taught at the Koninklijk Atheneum in Mechelen, also providing Dutch classes at the Royal Conservatoire Antwerp from 1907.

In 1919 he was appointed curator of the Plantin-Moretus Museum. During this period he published on the Plantin Press, the Verdussen family, and the poetry and pamphleteering of the 16th and 17th centuries. From 1923 to 1937 he was professor of Dutch literature at the Université libre de Bruxelles, in succession to August Vermeylen. He died in Antwerp on 12 February 1938 and was buried at the Schoonselhof Cemetery in Antwerp. A statue of him, unveiled in 1950, stands at the Sashuis near the Minnewater in Bruges.

== Honours ==
- 1920 : Officer in the Order of the Crown.

== Writings ==
- Peter Benoit (1892)
- Aan 't Minnewater : drie schetsen uit het Brugse leven (1893)
- Een mei van vroomheid (1903)
- Vlaamsche mensen (1907)
- De filosofoof van 't sashuis (1907)
- Het proza in de Vlaamse letterkunde (1909)
- Een Schutsgeest (1909)
- De nood der Bariseeles (1912)
- Bietje (1913)
- Caritate (1914)
- In t gedrang. Vertellingen uit den oorlog (1915)
- De toneelles (1917)
- t Pastorke van Schaerdycke (1919)
- t Kwartet der Jacobijnen (1920)
- Wat Oud-Vlaanderen zong (1920)
- Letterkundige verscheidenheden (1928)
- De muziek in Vlaanderen (1928)
- Brabant in 't verweer: bijdrage tot de studie der Zuid-Nederlandse strijdliteratuur in de eerste helft der 17e eeuw (1933)
- Peilingen (1935)
- De meesters van de gulden passer: Christoffel Plantin, aartsdrukker van Philips II, en zijn opvolgers, de Moretussen (1937)
- De vorstinnen van Brugge (naar de vertellingen van M. Sabbe, door Maurits Balfoort (1973)
- Avondbede
- Bernardus en de cisterciënzerfamilie in België
- Briefwisseling van de gebroeders Verdussen
- De minderbroeders en de oude Leuvense universiteit
- De oorlogstribulatiën van Meneer Van Poppel
- De oude harpspeelster
- De Plantijnsche werkstede
- Drie liederen in volkstrant
- Eeuwzang ter gelegenheid van de honderste verjaring van België's onafhankelijkheid
- Handschriften en vroegdrukken
- Het kerkske van te lande
- Het leven en de werken van Michiel de Swaen
- Het lied van onze klokken
- Hoe Stientje uit den Anker gevrijd werd
- Hooggetij: vaderlandsche kindercantate voor koren en symfonisch orkest
- Huldebetoon van Mr. Louis Franck
- Ik heb U gezien
- In de kriekentijd
- (Poëzie van) Julius en Maurits Sabbe
- Lenteliedje
- Melsens kruis
- Mozaiek: verspreide opstellen
- Oud Antwerpen : kerken en kloosters
- Oud België
- Peeter Heyns en de nimfen
- Philemons dans om de bruid
- Pluk de dag
- Stichtelyck ende vermakelyck proces tussen dry edellieden
- 't Is in U, zoetste lief
- Uit den taalstrijd in Zuid-Nederland tussen 1815–1830
- Van den mulder en de mulderin
- Zonnestralen
