= Antwerp Water Works =

AWW logo

The Antwerp Water Works (Dutch: Antwerpse Water Werken) or AWW produces water for the city of Antwerp (Belgium) and its surroundings. The AWW has a yearly production of 150,000,000 m^{3} (5.3×10^{9} cu ft) and a revenue of 100 million euro.

== History ==
Between 1832 and 1892, Antwerp was struck every ten to fifteen years by a major cholera epidemic which each time claimed a few thousand lives and lasted for about two years. In 1866 the cholera epidemic infected about 5000 people and about 3000 people died. Between 1861 and 1867 several propositions were made for a water supply for Antwerp. In 1873, under mayor Leopold De Wael, it was decided that a concession should be granted to secure the water supply of the city.

On 25 June 1873, a concession of 50 years was granted to the English engineers, Joseph Quick from London, together with John Dick, to organize the water supply of Antwerp. Due to a lack of funds and a dispute between the partners this venture stranded. In 1879, the English engineering company Easton & Anderson took over the yards and the concession. Within two years they succeeded in finishing the work. An exploitation society was established: the Antwerp Waterworks Company Limited, a society according to English law which would be in charge of the exploitation from 1881 up to 1930.

The water was won from the Nete river at the bridge of Walem. It was purified according to an original method: an iron filter. In the period 1881 up to 1908 the system was repaired repeatedly, until eventually a new method of filtration was chosen which was a combination of fast with slow sand filtration. This method of filtration is still being used today for the treatment of a large part of the raw material, now water from the Albert Canal.

In 1930, the concession came to an end, as no agreement could be reached with the English owners concerning a new construction in which the municipalities surrounding Antwerp would be included. The city of Antwerp took over the company and founded a mixed intermunicipal company (private and public participation) in which the English Waterworks kept a minority participation. The remaining shares were in the hands of the city of Antwerp and the surrounding municipalities of Berchem, Boechout, Borgerhout, Deurne, Edegem, Ekeren, Hoboken, Hove, Mortsel, Kontich and Wilrijk. The English withdrew from the company in 1965. In the same year a new production site in Oelegem was established and a new office building in Antwerp. During the dry summer of 1976 it became clear that the reserve capacity needed to be expanded and in 1982 the reservoir of Broechem was inaugurated. The second concession ended after 53 years, so in 1983 a new concession to the AWW was granted.

In 2003 Brabo Industrial Water Solutions (BIWS) started, a consortium with Ondeo Industrial Solutions, to provide water tailored for the industry. In 2004 the RI-ANT project started (together with Aquafin), which takes over the management and the maintenance of the sewerage network of Antwerp.

== See also ==
- EU water policy
- Public water supply
- Water purification

== Sources ==
- AWW
- AWW History (Dutch)
