= Virginie Loveling =

Flemish author

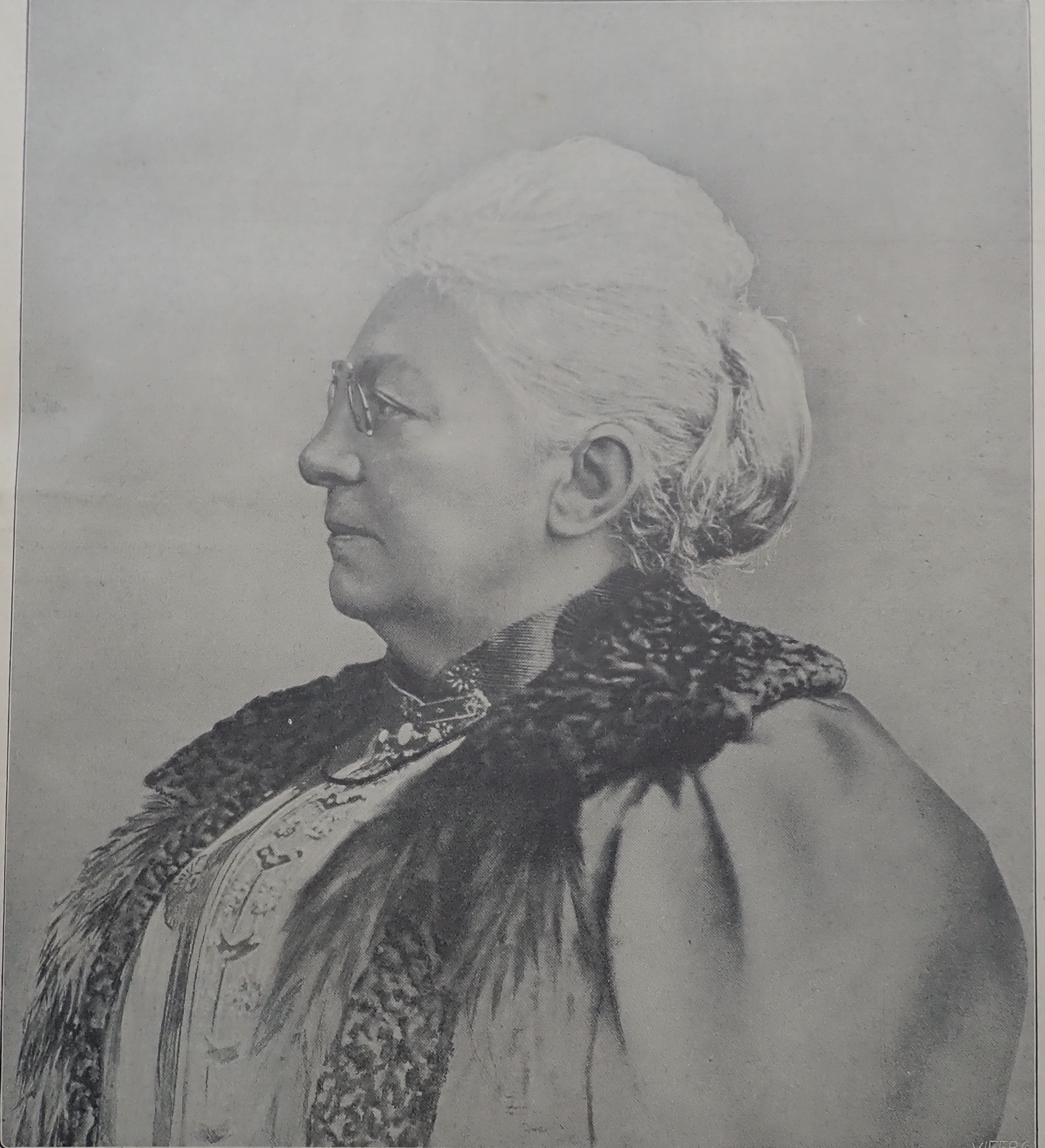
- Born: Virginie Marie Loveling; 17 May 1836; Nevele, Belgium
- Died: 1 December 1923 (aged 87); Ghent, Belgium
- Other name: W. E. C. Walter
- Occupations: children's writer, essayist, novelist, poet

Virginie (Marie) Loveling (17 May 1836 – 1 December 1923) was a Flemish author of poetry, novels, essays and children's stories. She also wrote under the pseudonym W. E. C. Walter. She did write sentimentally early in her career but her later novels dealt with difficult subjects directly.

== Biography ==
Virginie Loveling was born on May 17 in Nevele in East Flanders, Belgium. She was the younger sister of Rosalie Loveling, also an author, with whom she co-wrote the more sentimental part of her work. After the death of their father, Herman Loveling, the family moved to Ghent, where the sisters moved in circles of French-speaking, mainly anti-clerical intelligentsia before eventually returning to Nevele.

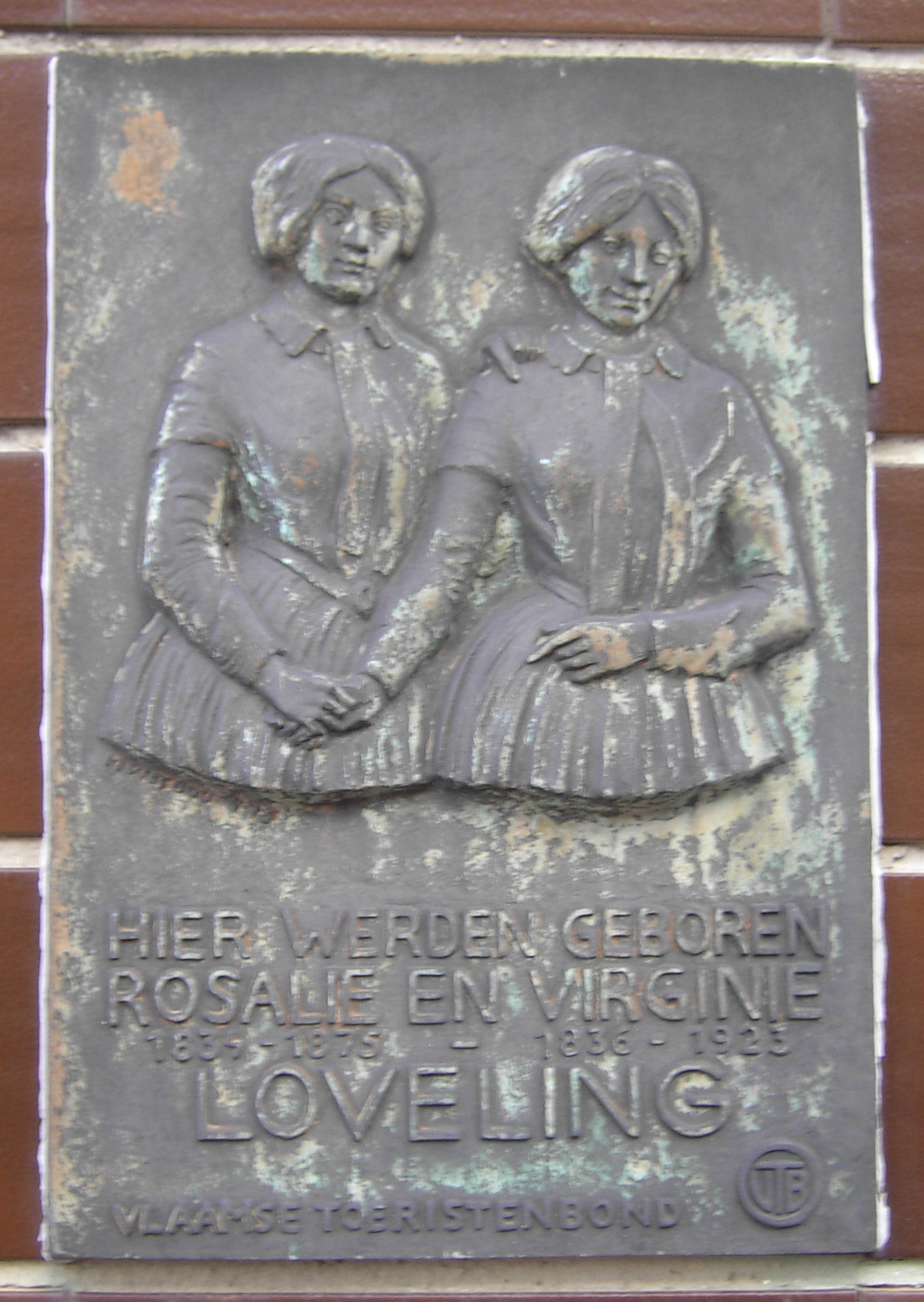
Rosalie and Virginie Loveling, a memorial plaque at the birth house of Virginie and Rosalie Loveling in Nevele

Together with her sister, she wrote realistic and descriptive poetry with a romantic undertone. They also published two collections of essays on rural communities as well as on city bourgeoisie.

After her sister's death in 1875, she wrote children's stories along with novels and essays that paint a poignant picture of the era. With a noted intellectual and psychological angle, controversial subjects and women characters of some depth. Her approach to difficult subjects is direct and truthful, she is noted for her lack of metaphor. She also co-authored Levensleer (1912), a humoristic take on Ghent's French-speaking bourgeoisie with her nephew Cyriel Buysse.

Official recognition followed with the novel Een dure eed (A Costly Oath) in 1891, which received the quinquennial prize for Dutch literature.

Virginie Loveling died on 1 December 1923 in Nevele.

== Honours ==
- 1900:Knight in the Order of Leopold.
- 1920 :Commander in the Order of the Crown.

== Bibliography ==
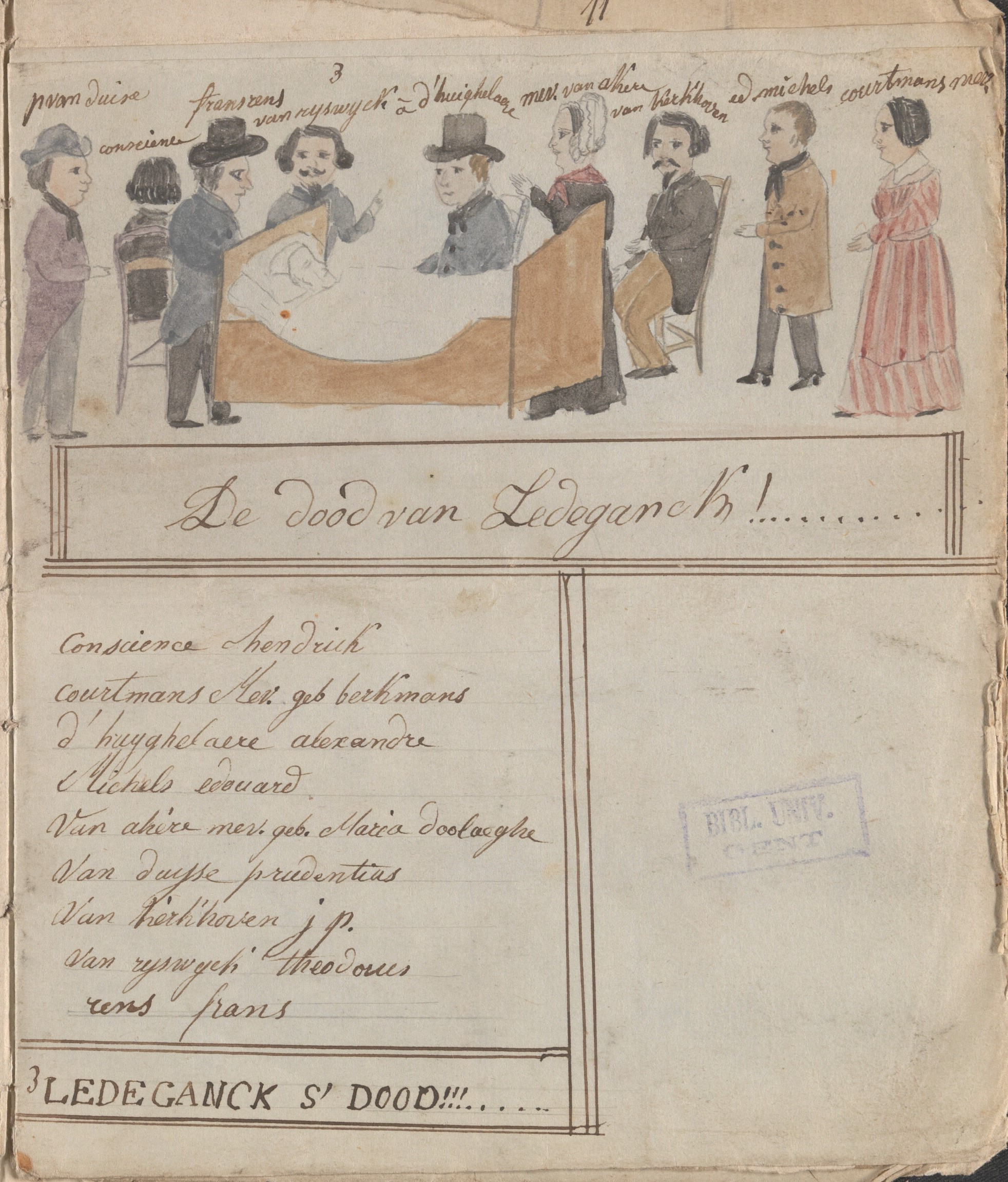
Excerpt from a manuscript with sketches, novels and translations of poetry. Written by Rosalie and Virginie Loveling in the 19th century.

=== Co-authored with Rosalie Loveling ===
- Gedichten (1870)
- Novellen (1874) Rosalie : Jan-oom en Belle-Trezeken, De baan der kunst, Serafine, Broeder en zuster, Meester Huyghe; Virginie: Drie kleine schetsen, Sidon, In de Hope van Vrede, De verdwaalden, Emiliaantje
- Nieuwe novellen (1876) Rosalie: Mijnheer Daman en zijn erfgenamen, Juffrouw Leocadie Stevens, Po en Paoletto; Virginie: Octavie en Estelle, De kwellende gedachte, De vijftig franken
- Polydoor en Theodoor en andere novellen en schetsen (1883) Virginie: Polydoor en Theodoor; Rosalie: De hond, Uwe tweede vrouw, Het eenig kind, De gierigheid, Kinderverdriet, Onbehendige troostwoorden, Iets over het onderwijs der vrouw, Beloften en bedreigingen, Mijn verre neef
- Onze Rensen (1950)
- Niets is onbeduidend (compilation and commentary by A. Van Elslander, 1978)

=== Co-authored with Cyriel Buysse ===
- Levensleer (Novel 1912)

=== Sole author ===
- In onze Vlaamsche gewesten (political essays, 1877)
- Drie novellen (essays, 1879)
- Josijntje (children's story 1883)
- Fideel en Fidelineken (children's story 1883)
- Het hoofd van 't huis en allerlei schetsen (essays, 1883)
- De spinnekop, Braaf maar niet onbedachtzaam zijn en Gevangen zijn. (children's stories 1884)
- De sledevaart (novel, 1884)
- De muisjes (children's story 1884)
- Sophie (novel, 3 parts 1885)
- De kleine Italianen (stories 1886)
- Een Sint-Nicolaasgeschenk (children's story 886)
- Van allerlei (children's story 1886)
- De bekoring (children's story 1886)
- De geschiedenis van Moorken (children's story 1886)
- Plagen en goeddoen (children's story 1886)
- Het onweder (children's story 1886)
- Een winter in het Zuiderland (Novel 1890)
- Een dure eed (Novel 1891)
- Idonia (Novel 1891)
- Eene idylle (Novel 1893)
- Een vonkje van genieen andere novellen (essays, 1893)
- De troon van Engeland (Novel 1893)
- De bruid des Heeren (Novel 1895)
- Mijnheer Connehaye (Novel 1895)
- Het land der verbeelding (Novel 1896)
- Madeleine (+ Contrasten) (Novel 1897)
- Meesterschap (Novel 1898)
- De twistappel (Novel 1904)
- Erfelijk belast (Novel 1906)
- De groote manoeuvers (Novel 1906)
- Het lot der kinderen (Novel 1906)
- Erfelijk belast (Novel 1906)
- Jonggezellen Levens (Essays 1907)
- Een revolverschot (Novel 1911)
- Bina (Essays 1915)
- Tamboer (Essays 1920)
- Van hier en elders (essays 1925)
- Volledige werken (compilation in 10 volumes 1933–36)
- Herinneringen aan Franskens (Novel 1950)
- Herinneringen (essays 1967)

== See also ==
- Flemish literature
- Virginie Lovelinggebouw
