= Victor Sabbe =

Victor Herman Frans Maria Sabbe (Blankenberge, 10 June 1906 – Bruges, 20 February 1958) was a Belgian lawyer and liberal politician.

He was a member of the municipal council of Bruges, a member of the Belgian parliament, and president of the Liberaal Vlaams Verbond (LVV) (1945–1957).

== Sources ==
- Victor Sabbe
- Corremans, H., Encyclopedie van de Vlaamse Beweging, Tielt-Utrecht, Lannoo, 1975, 2 vol., p. 1379-1380.
