= Julius Hoste Jr. =

Belgian businessman and politician

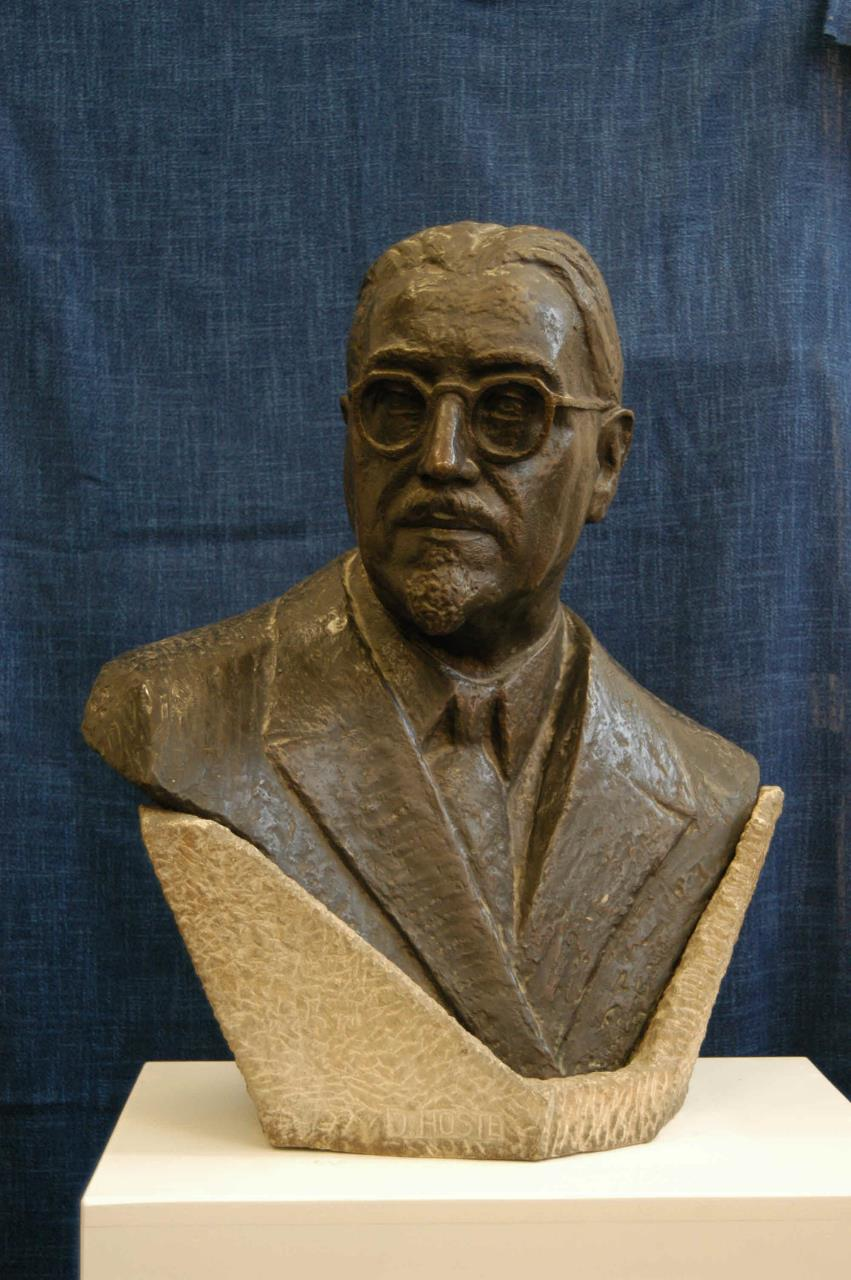
- Julius Hoste Jr.
- Born: Julius Hoste; 7 June 1884; Brussels, Belgium
- Died: 1 February 1954 (aged 69); Brussels, Belgium
- Occupations: Businessman; politician

Julius Hoste Jr. (7 June 1884 – 1 February 1954) was a Belgian businessman and liberal politician.

He went to highschool at the Koninklijk Atheneum (E: Royal Atheneum) of Brussels. In 1902 he started at the Universite Libre de Bruxelles (ULB), where he obtained a law degree in 1907. Already as a student he had become interested in the Flemish movement, like his father Julius Hoste Sr. While he was a student, he was a member of Geen Taal, Geen Vrijheid, and together with Nico Gunzburg and Frans Van Cauwelaert, he founded the Algemeen Vlaams Studentenbond.

== Career ==
After Hoste graduated, he worked shortly for the bar, but soon started working for the newspaper company founded by his father, which published newspapers such as Het Laatste Nieuws, De Vlaamsche Gazet van Brussel and De Zweep (a Flemish weekly). In 1909, he cofounded the Liberale Volksbond of the district Brussels. This organization was founded in reaction to the Franskiljonism of the Liberal Party of Brussels. In 1913, he also participated in the foundation of the Liberaal Vlaams Verbond.

During World War I, he lived in the Netherlands. He worked for the newspaper De Vlaamsche Stem until it began German-sponsored activism. In reaction he and Frans Van Cauwelaert founded the newspaper Vrij België. Together they also founded the Vlaams-Belgisch Verbond, and worked on the minimumprogramma (E: minimum-program) to establish linguistic uniformity in Flanders (Dutch) and Wallonia (French), Dutch-language usage in Flanders for education, administration, justice and army. After the war this remained the program for the Vlaams-Belgisch Verbond.

After the war Hoste took over the management of the publishing company, and Het Laatste Nieuws became the most popular newspaper in Flanders. The success of the newspaper stood in strong contrast to the bad results for the liberals in Brussels in the elections of 1920. Julius Hoste would become president of the Algemene Belgische persbond (1935–1936), and secretary of the Verbond der Brusselse dagbladbestuurders (1939).

In 1935 he entered the political scene, and campaigned against the fascist parties Rex and VNV, and in 1936 became Minister of Education in the second government of Paul Van Zeeland. While he was in office, he founded the Koninklijke Vlaamse Academie voor Wetenschappen, Letteren en Schone Kunsten and a Dutch and French cultural council (1938).

During World War II he stayed in Great Britain, where he became the under-secretary for education in the Belgian government in exile. After the war, he helped reestablish the Liberale Volksbond and the Liberaal Vlaams Verbond. In 1947, he was one of the main authors of the Oxford Manifesto on liberalism. In 1949 he was chosen as liberal senator for Brussels, which he remained until his death in 1954. As a politician he paid attention to the problems of the Belgian communities (Flanders and Wallonia) and world peace during the Cold War.

== Sources ==
- Julius Hoste Jr.
- Harry Van Velthoven, Zwerver in niemandsland, Julius Hoste en zijn Londens oorlogsdagboek, Willemfonds Brussel 1987
