= Julius Hoste Sr. =

Belgian writer and businessman

Julius Hoste Sr. (Tielt, 23 January 1848 – Brussels, 28 March 1933), was a Belgian writer and businessman. He is the father of Julius Hoste Jr.

In 1888, he founded the moderate liberal Flemish newspaper Het Laatste Nieuws. For the Flemish theatre in Brussels (KVS), he wrote several very successful historical plays, such as De Brusselsche straatzanger (1883) and De kleine patriot (1889). He was a freemason, and a member of the lodge Les Amis Philanthropes of the Grand Orient of Belgium in Brussels.

== Bibliography ==
- De Brusselsche straatzanger (The Brussels Scheeren street singer) (1883)
- De kleine patriot (The Little Patriot) (1889)
- Waterloo! (1889)
- Breidel en De Coninc (The bridle and Coninc)
- De plezante reis (The pleasant trip)

== See also ==
- Flemish literature

== Sources ==
- Marcel Bots, Luc Sieben, Jaak Van Schoor, Elie Bradt, Romain van Eeno en Roger Desmed (Ed.), Vader Hoste, Liberaal Archief 1989
