= 't Zal wel gaan =

Belgian student society

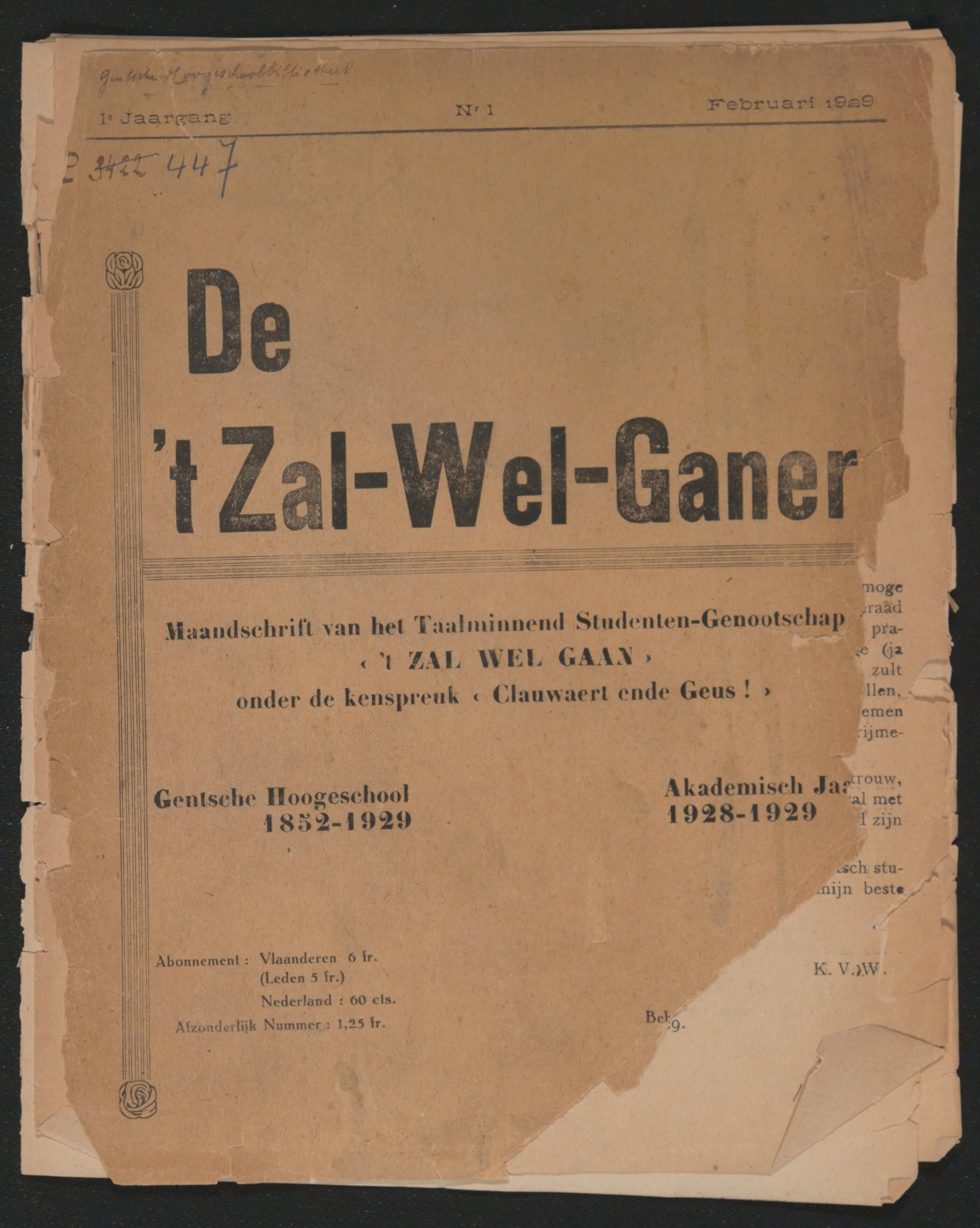
Frontpage of the magazine 't Zal wel gaan.

TSG 't Zal wel gaan, is a non-profit student society founded in the 19th century to promote Flemish culture and liberalism in Flanders, based at Ghent University. Since its inception, the student fraternity was characterized by its progressive, Flemish, and libertarian nature. It supports the absolute separation of church and state. 't Zal wel gaan remains a student society and a meeting place for intellectual debates.

== History ==
't Zal wel gaan (a.k.a. 't Zal), was created in 1852, by students at the Athenaeum of Ghent. The most prominent among these students was Julius Vuylsteke.
Soon afterwards, the association moved to Ghent University where it continued its activities with other Political and Philosophical student societies.

During the Nineteenth century, the student society became notorious for its Anti-clericalism and played an important role in the Flemish Movement's struggle for the use of Dutch in Belgian education. However, the onset of World War I soon caused an ideological crisis within the student fraternity. Orangist sentiment gave way to an anti-authoritarian philosophy of emancipation.

Members of 't Zal wel gaan later joined the resistance during the Spanish Civil War and World War II. They also played a role during the controversy surrounding King Leopold III and the student revolts of May 1968.

Today the society continues to participate in ethical and political debates. It celebrated its 150th birthday in 2002 as the oldest extant Flemish student society.
