= Het Laatste Nieuws =

Dutch-language Belgian daily newspaper

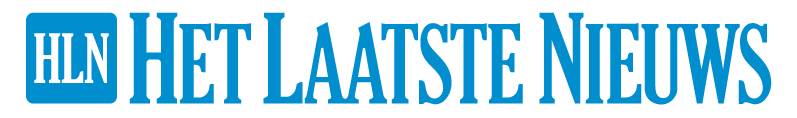

- Front page of Het Laatste Nieuws on 8 May 2025
- Type: Daily newspaper
- Format: Berliner
- Owner: DPG Media
- Editor: Dimitri Antonissen, Brecht Decaestecker, Frederik De Swaef
- Founded: 1888
- Headquarters: Mediaplein 1 Antwerp
- Website: HLN.be

Het Laatste Nieuws (HLN; Dutch pronunciation: [ət ˌlaːtstə ˈnius]; in English The Latest News) is a Dutch-language newspaper based in Antwerp, Belgium. It was founded by Julius Hoste Sr. on 7 June 1888. It is now part of DPG Media, and is the most popular newspaper in Flanders and Belgium.

== History ==
=== 19th century ===
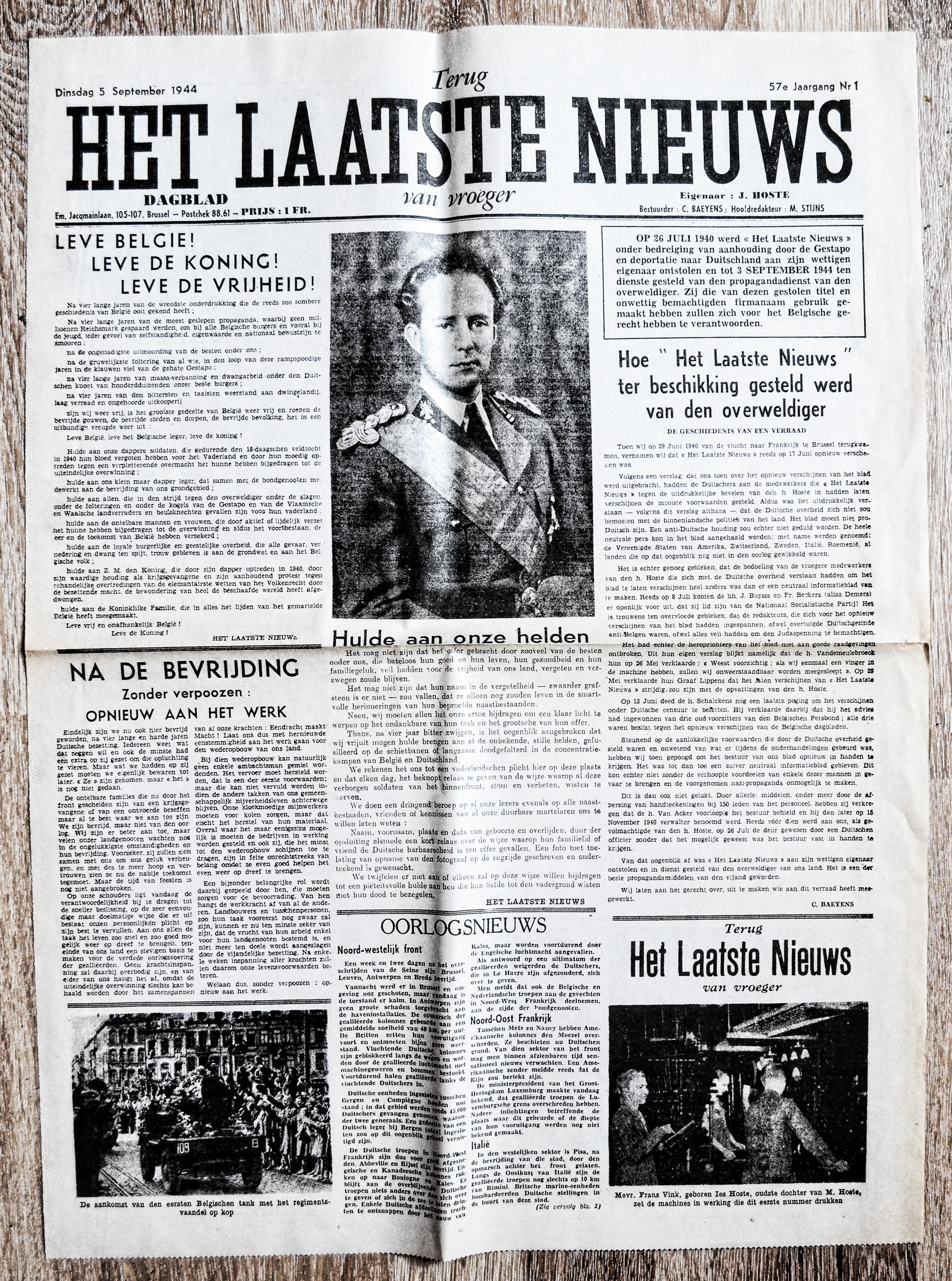
Front page of Flemish newspaper "Het Laatste Nieuws" of 5 September 1944. With headline: Long live Belgium !, Long live The King !, Long live Freedom! in honor of the liberation of Belgium.

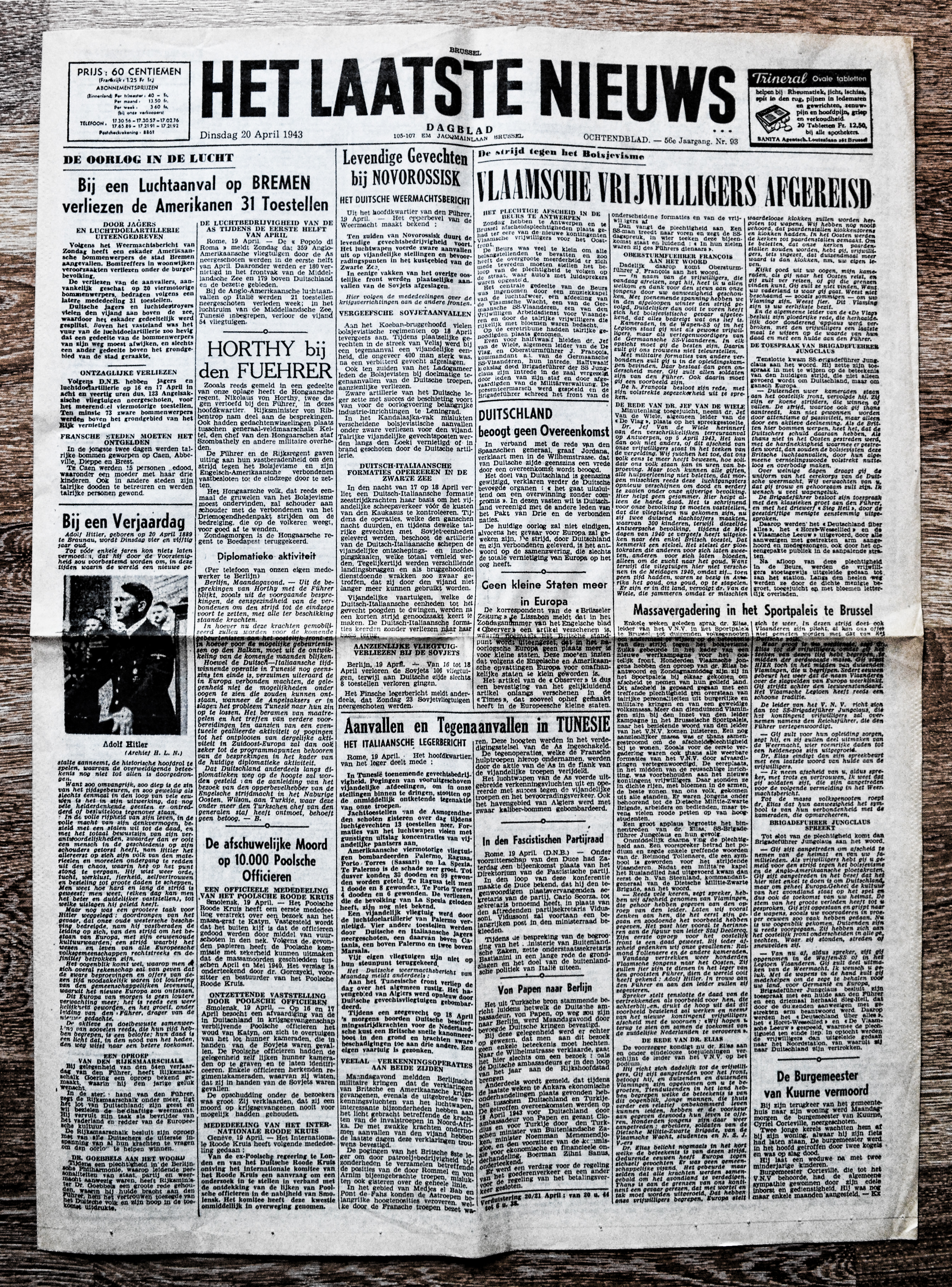
Front page of the Flemish newspaper Het Laatste Nieuws, 20 April 1943

The liberal Julius Hoste Sr. founded the newspaper on 7 June 1888 five days before the Belgian elections. With his newspaper he wanted to support the Liberal Party in the upcoming elections and on the other side the Flemish movement in Brussels, a city which was dominated by francophone bourgeois (Franskiljons). The newspaper supported the cause of the Gelijkheidswet (equality law between Dutch and French in Belgium), the rescue of the Royal Flemish Theatre in Brussels and the election of the first Flemish, liberal, Ghent municipal governing board in 1907.

Its liberal character, anti-Francophone stance and support for the Flemish movement were essential characteristics of the new daily, just like its anti-clericalism. In 1897, Flor Burton founded the newspaper De Nieuwe Gazet in Antwerp, with a substantially similar editorial policy.

=== 1900–1945 ===
When Julius Hoste Sr. died, his son, Julius Hoste Jr., took over full publishing responsibility. He moderated the confrontational style favored by his father, adopting a more temperate and formal tone. He broadened the scope of the newspaper, including more regional news, and expanded the sports section to reach an even wider public.

When World War II broke out, Julius Hoste Jr. fled to the United Kingdom, although his newspaper continued publication under Nazi control. During this period, The Adventures of Tintin was in the paper. Stories included Tintin in the Congo, Tintin in America, The Broken Ear, The Shooting Star, and The Secret of the Unicorn.

=== 1945–1989 ===
After the war, Julius Hoste Jr. regained control, but the business needed to be rebuilt. He shared day-to-day management with Albert Maertens, and Marcel Stijns became head editor. On 1 February 1954, Julius Hoste Jr. suddenly died. By means of an ingenious legal arrangement, he ensured that the political heritage of his newspaper was guaranteed, and the company was incorporated when he died. His heirs commissioned Albert Maertens to create a foundation specifically intended to safeguard the future political and editorial policy of the newspaper.

On 3 May 1955, the Stichting Het Laatste Nieuws (English: The Latest News Foundation) was set up. It included in its charter an explicit reference to the liberal declaration of Oxford, or Oxford Manifesto, which offered guarantees of editorial continuity for readers and journalists even in the event of the newspaper being sold. Frans Vink, the son-in-law of Julius Hoste Jr., headed the company; Albert Maertens helped to manage the structure of the company, and Marcel Stijns remained the head editor. A new company was created: the Uitgeverij J. Hoste NV.

When television broadcasting started in Belgium in 1954, the competitive environment became more challenging and the newspaper had to modernize its activity. The Antwerp-headquartered De Nieuwe Gazet was taken over, partially in 1957 and then completely in 1963. The foundation's business was expanded with the introduction of weekly magazines and a printing business. In order to finance the new ventures, negotiations were started with potential investors. Albert Maertens began talks with the Van Thillo family, the Flemish bankers based in Antwerp, who had shown a particular interest in press investment.

In the 1970s and 1980s, the Van Thillo family acquired more and more shares in the newspaper. Its editorial course remained in accordance with the principles articulated by the foundation. At the moment, DPG Media is headed by Christian Van Thillo.

=== Since 1990 ===
Het Laatste Nieuws grew since 1995 from an extremely sensation-oriented (liberal) newspaper to a sensation-oriented, popular-populist newspaper, with particular attention to 'the people in and behind the news'. The newspaper includes regional, national and limited international news. Het Laatste Nieuws is published in 21 regional editions, each with the same part with international and limited international news, but each also with a few pages of news from different Flemish regions. The paper also had an extended sports section.

The newspaper's website hln.be is very popular in Flanders (top 10 most visited sites in Belgium since 2016, according to the CIM statistics), and is characterized by its regularly updated, sensational articles, often with clickbait-titles.

==== Circulation ====
In the period of 1995–96 Het Laatste Nieuws had a circulation of 303,993 copies. The circulation of the paper was 287,000 copies in 2001. It was 341,257 copies in 2002. In 2003 its circulation was 294,000 copies, making it the best selling newspaper in Belgium.

In 2009 Het Laatste Nieuws had a circulation of 287,162 copies. The approximate circulation of the paper was 370,000 copies in 2010.

== Notable journalists ==
- Piet Van Brabant (1932–2006)
