= Leonard Nolens =

Belgian poet and diary writer (1947–2025)

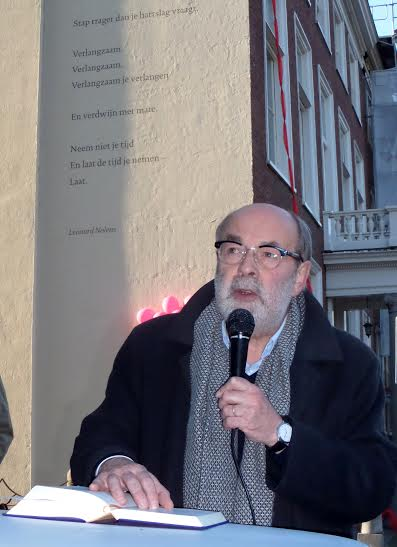
Nolens (2015)

Leon Helena Sylvain Nolens (11 April 1947 – 26 December 2025), known by the pseudonym Leonard Nolens, was a Belgian poet and diary writer.

== Life and career ==
Nolens was born in Bree on 11 April 1947. He graduated from the Hoger Instituut voor Vertalers en Tolken in Antwerp. Nolens lived and worked in Antwerp. Themes in his writings include love and ways to escape one's identity. He died on 26 December 2025, at the age of 78.

== Bibliography ==
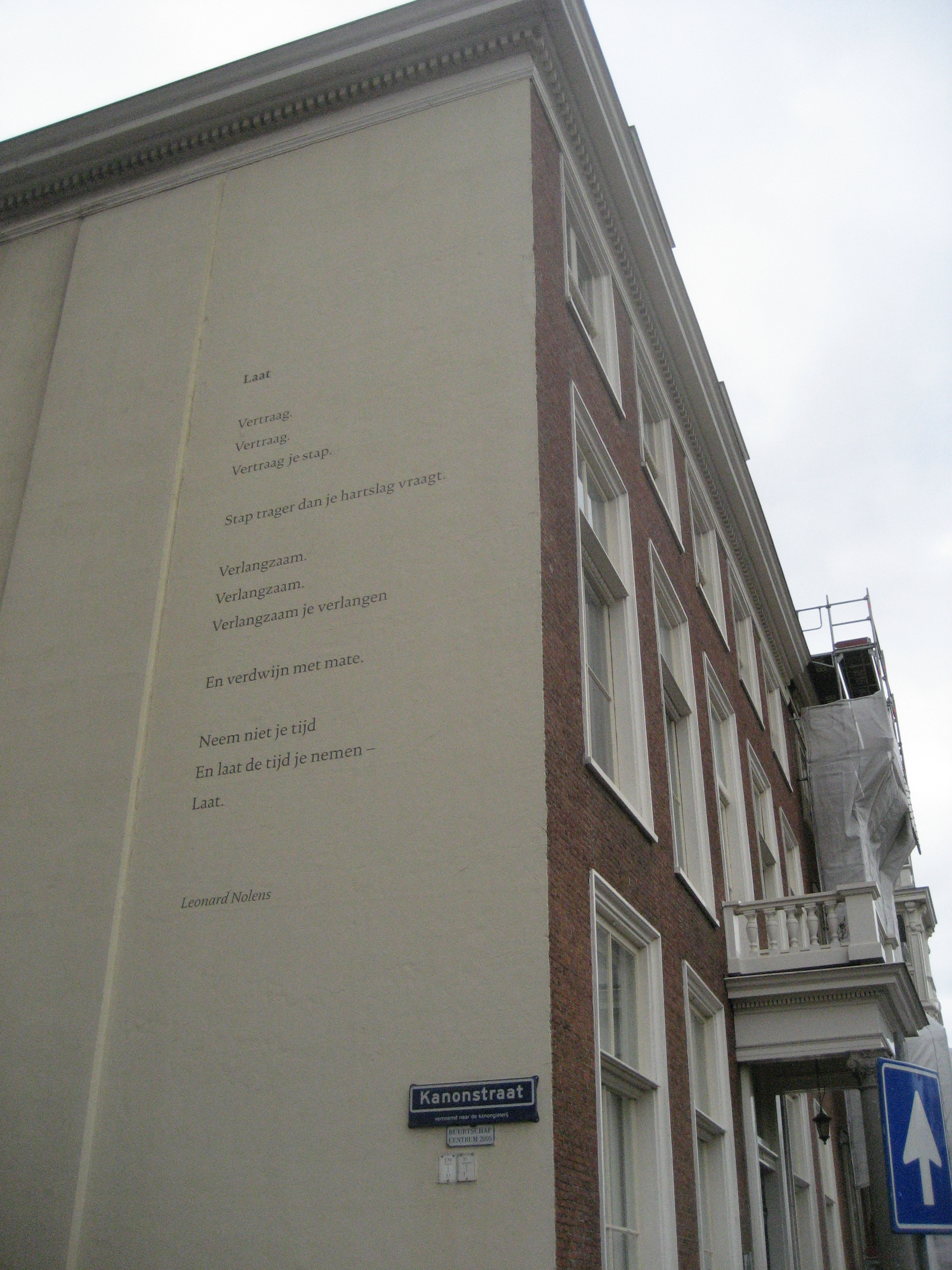
Laat as a wall poem in The Hague

- 1969 – Orpheushanden (poetry)
- 1973 – De muzeale minnaar (poetry)
- 1975 – Twee vormen van zwijgen (poetry)
- 1977 – Incantatie (poetry)
- 1979 – Alle tijd van de wereld (poetry)
- 1981 – Hommage (poetry)
- 1983 – Vertigo (poetry)
- 1986 – De gedroomde figuur (poetry)
- 1988 – Geboortebewijs (poetry)
- 1989 – Stukken van mensen (diary)
- 1990 – Liefdes verklaringen (poetry)
- 1991 – Hart tegen hart (poetry)
- 1992 – Tweedracht (poetry)
- 1993 – Blijvend vertrek (diary)
- 1994 – Honing en as (poetry)
- 1995 – De vrek van Missenburg (diary)
- 1996 – En verdwijn met mate (poetry)
- 1997 – De liefdesgedichten (poetry)
- 1998 – Een lastig portret (diary)
- 1999 – Voorbijganger (poetry)
- 2001 – Manieren van leven (poetry)
- 2003 – Derwisj (poetry)
- 2004 – Bres" met etsen van Dan Van Severen (a livre de peintre, Ergo Pers Gent)
- 2004 – Laat alle deuren op een kier (verzamelde gedichten) (poetry)
- 2005 – Een dichter in Antwerpen (poetry)
- 2007 – Een fractie van een kus (poetry)
- 2007 – Bres (poetry)
- 2008 – Woestijnkunde (poetry)
- 2009 – Dagboek van een dichter 1979-2007 (combined diaries)
- 2011 – Zeg aan de kinderen dat wij niet deugen (poetry)

== Awards ==
- 1974 – Prijs van het beste literaire debuut for De muzeale minnaar
- 1976 – Arkprijs van het Vrije Woord for Twee vormen van zwijgen
- 1976 – Poëzieprijs van de provincie Antwerpen for Twee vormen van zwijgen
- 1980 – Hugues C. Pernath-prijs for Alle tijd van de wereld
- 1980 – Poëzieprijs van de provincie Limburg for Alle tijd van de wereld
- 1984 – Tweejaarlijkse poëzieprijs van De Vlaamse Gids for Vertigo
- 1991 – Jan Campert prijs for Liefdesverklaringen
- 1997 – Constantijn Huygensprijs for his entire oeuvre
- 2002 – Gedichtendagprijzen for Hostie out of Manieren van leven
- 2007 – Karel van de Woestijneprijs for poetry of Sint-Martens-Latem
- 2008 – VSB Poetry Prize for Bres
- 2012 – Prijs der Nederlandse Letteren

== See also ==
- Flemish literature

== Sources ==
- Leonard Nolens (in Dutch)
- Willem M. Roggeman, Leonard Nolens In: Beroepsgeheim 5 (1986)
