= Herman Teirlinck =

Belgian writer (1879–1967)

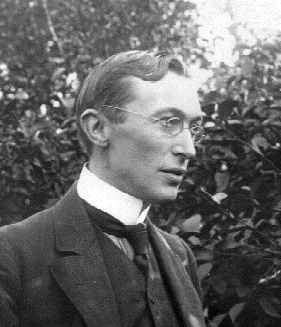
- Teirlinck (1905)
- Born: 24 February 1879; Molenbeek-Saint-Jean
- Died: 4 February 1967 (aged 87); Beersel-Lot
- Education: University of Ghent
- Writing career
- Genres: plays, poetry
- Notable work: Ik dien
- Notable awards: Prijs der Nederlandse Letteren

Herman Louis Cesar Teirlinck (24 February 1879 – 4 February 1967) was a Belgian writer. He was the fifth child and only son of Isidoor Teirlinck and Oda van Nieuwenhove, who were both teachers in Brussels. As a child, he had frail health and spent much of his time at the countryside in Zegelsem (East Flanders), with his paternal grandparents. He was nominated for the Nobel Prize in Literature six times.

== Education ==
From 1886 until 1890 he went to the primary school Karel Buls in Brussels. He went to high school at the Koninklijk Athenaeum (E: royal athenaeum) in Brussels, where he studied Greek and Latin. One of his teachers was Hyppoliet Meert, a Flamingant and language purist. In 1879, at the request of his father, he started as a student at the Faculty of Science at the Université libre de Bruxelles (ULB), but he himself wanted to become a writer, not a scientist. He succeeded in his first year of medicine, but he then left the ULB and went to the University of Ghent (RUG) to study Germanic philology; he didn't do well here either and left RUG also without graduating. He wrote his first poems, Metter Sonnewende (1899) and Verzen (1900). In Ghent, he met Karel van de Woestijne, and they would become lifelong friends until the death of Karel van de Woestijne in 1929.

== Career ==
In 1902, he married his first wife Mathilde Lauwers, and together they had two daughters: Stella and Leentje Teirlinck. He became appointed the civil servant responsible for the Fine Arts in Brussels. Also in 1902, he published De wonderbare wereld (E: The Wonderful World), followed by Het stille gesternte (E: The silent stars) in 1903. In 1903, he was also co-founder of the illustrated magazine Vlaanderen (E: Flanders), which succeeded Van nu en straks (E: Of now and soon). In 1906, he became Belgian correspondent for the Amsterdam newspaper Het Handelsblad. He became increasingly interested in the city life of Brussels and in 1909, he published the novel Ivoren Aapje (E: Ivory monkey), which was his first novel about Brussels. Also in 1909 he published his essay Het Vlaamsch Tooneel (E: Flemish theatre), which showed his appreciation for Edward Gordon Craig. He went to live in Linkebeek, where he, as a liberal, got involved in local politics.

From 1912 until 1926 he was director of the furniture factory Ateliers Victor De Cunsel. He even became secretary of the Wood-industry employers' organization, which allowed him to visit Belgian Congo.

== Literary career ==
In the meantime he continued with his writing, such as with Johan Doxa and De lemen torens in 1917 and Nieuwe Uilenspiegel in 1922. From 1910 through 1936 he was a teacher of Dutch at the Stedelijke Jongensnormaalschool (E: Urban boy teacher school) in Brussels. From 1925 through 1938, he taught Dutch at the Akademie voor Schone Kunsten (E:Academy for Fine Arts) in Antwerp and from 1928 up to 1936 at the Stedelijke Meisjesnormaalschool (E: Urban little girl teacher school) in Brussels.

In 1917 he became a member of the Maatschappij der Nederlandse Letterkunde (Society for Dutch Literature) in Leiden, and in 1919, he became a member of the Koninklijke Vlaamse Academie voor Taal- en Letterkunde (E:Royal Flemish Academy for Language - and Literature). In 1928, his first wife died. The same year Herman Teirlinck married Johanna Hoofmans from Linkebeek. Five years later, they moved to the house at the Uwenberg 14 in Beersel.

In 1920 he became teacher of Flemish at the Royal Court of Belgium; in 1933 Private Councillor of King Albert I; in 1934 Councillor for Art and Science of King Leopold III and in 1951 Honorary Councillor for Art and Science of King Baudouin I, in Dutch King Boudewijn I.

Herman Teirlinck wrote in a typical Flemish style, and he considered Karel van de Woestijne, to be his most important example. This becomes apparent in his work in t Bedrijf van den kwade in De doolage. He was acquainted with impressionistic painters, who also had a strong influence on his work. His collection of poems Zon (E:sun) is the best example of this influence. Over the years his language became more Dutch and less Flemish.

Theatre interested Herman Teirlinck most. He wrote plays such as De vertraagde film (E: Slowed down movie) (1922), Ik dien (E: I serve) (1924) in De man zonder lijf (E: The man without a body) (1925). Other plays are De ekster en de galg (E: The magpie and the gallow) (1937) and Ave (1938) in which he experimented with modern techniques to involve the public more in the action.

In his last literary period, which started with the novel Maria Speermalie in 1940, he approached existentialism. Also the free passionate life of people, with its refined over-civilization and its contradicting extremes, he took into consideration. In 1946, he became co-founder and Director of the Nieuw Vlaams Tijdschrift and he founded the Studio van het Nationaal Toneel in Antwerp, which would later become the famous Studio Herman Teirlinck. He wanted to create a renewal of the education of actors. With the essay Pointering 48 of 1948, he wrote the basic program for the school. The final foundation of the educational principles of the Studio was written down in the Dramatisch Peripatetikon in 1959. In 1951 he created the Arkprijs van het Vrije Woord. In Het gevecht met de engel (E: The fight with the angel), the unavoidability of destiny was emphasized (1952). His last novel Zelfportret of Het galgemaal appeared in 1955, which was an exercise in self-reflection.

== Mijol Club ==
In 1912, he founded the literary club De Mijol Club (also M.C, Magna Carta, or Marie Jolles Club), of which Fernand Victor Toussaint van Boelaere, August Vermeylen, Alfred Hegenscheidt, and Ernest Claes were members. They gathered at the tavern 3 Fonteinen in Beersel (which still exists). Mijol is the name of a game played in a tray with cobblestones.

== Honours ==
- 1923 :Officer in the Order of the Crown, by royal Decree of 21.7.1923.

=== Other awards ===
- Belgian National Award for theatre (1925 and 1928),
- Belgian National Award for his entire oeuvre (1950),
- Prijs der Nederlandse Letteren (Belgium and the Netherlands) in 1956.
- Dr Honoris Causas Universite Libre de Bruxelles (1938),
- Dr Honoris Causas University of Amsterdam (1947),
- Dr Honoris Causas University of Liège (1954)
- Dr Honoris Causas University of Ghent (1959)

== Bibliography ==
- Verzen (1900; poems)
- Landelijke historiën (1901; novel)
- De wonderbare wereld (1902; novel)
- Het stille gesternte (1903; novel)
- 't Bedrijf van den kwade (1904; novel)
- De doolage (1905; novel)
- Zon, een bundel beschrijvingen (1906; essays)
- De kroonluchter, kunstgenootschap (1907; novel)
- Het avontuurlijk leven van Lieven Cordaat (1908)
- Mijnheer J.B. Serjanszoon, orator didacticus (1908; novel)
- Het ivoren aapje (1909; novel)
- Johan Doxa, `Vier herinneringen aan een Brabantschen Gothieker' (1917; novel)
- De Nieuwe Uilenspiegel of de jongste incarnatie van den scharlaken Thijl (1920; bewerking van het oude volksverhaal)
- De vertraagde film (1922; theatre)
- Ik dien (1924; theatre)
- De man zonder lijf (1925; theatre)
- De wonderlijke mei (1925; theatre)
- De leemen torens (1928; novel in letters met Karel van de Woestijne)
- De ekster op de galg (1937; theatre)
- Elckerlyc (1937)
- Ave (1938; theatre)
- Maria Speermalie, 1875–1937 (1940; novel)
- De XXXX brieven aan Rolande (1944)
- Het gevecht met de engel (1952; novel)
- Zelfportret of Het galgemaal (1955; novel)
- Wijding voor een derde geboorte (1956; essay)
- Dramatisch Peripatetikon (1959; theatre teaching principles)
- Verzameld werk, 8 vol. (1955–1969)
- Verzameld werk, 9 vol. (1973)

== See also ==
- Flemish literature

== Sources ==
- Bousset, Hugo. 1968. Herman Teirlinck. Brugge: Desclée De Brouwer (Ontmoetingen; 75). - 58 p.
- Vanhemelryck, Fernand e.a. (red.). 1979. Herman Teirlinck. Dworp (Beersel): Zenne en Zonien Opbouwwerk. - 217 p.
- Herman Teirlinck (Dutch)
- Herman Teirlinck (Dutch)
- Herman Teirlinck (Dutch)
