= Astrid Roemer =

Surinamese-Dutch writer and teacher (1947–2026)

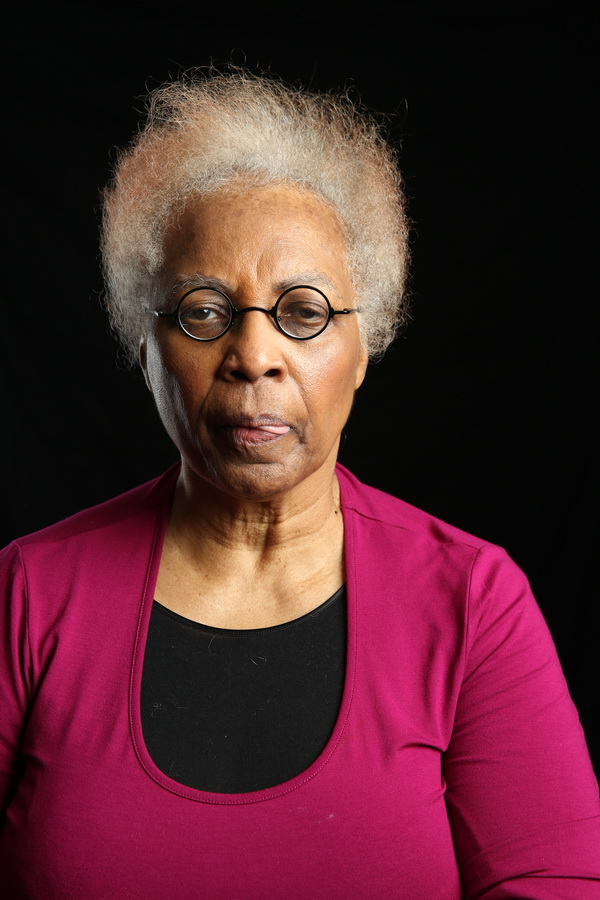
- Roemer in 2016
- Born: Astrid Heligonda Roemer; 27 April 1947; Paramaribo, Suriname
- Died: 8 January 2026 (aged 78); Paramaribo, Suriname
- Occupation: Writer
- Writing career
- Language: Dutch
- Notable work: On a Woman's Madness (Over de gekte van een vrouw)
- Notable awards: P. C. Hooft Award (2016); Prijs der Nederlandse Letteren (2021)

Astrid Heligonda Roemer (Dutch pronunciation: [ˈɑstrɪt ɦeːliˈɣɔndaː ˈrumər], 27 April 1947 – 8 January 2026) was a Surinamese-Dutch writer and teacher. The Dutch-language author published novels, novellas, drama, poetry and radio plays. In 2016 she won the P. C. Hooft Award, the most important literary prize in the Netherlands and Belgium. Roemer was the first Surinamese author to win this award. She was also the first Surinamese author to win the Prijs der Nederlandse Letteren, which she was awarded in 2021. Translations of her work were longlisted for the National Book Award for Translated Literature in 2023 and the International Booker Prize in 2025.

== Life ==
Roemer was born on 27 April 1947 in Paramaribo, the capital of Surinam, to a Creole family. She attended the city's Kweekschool (Surinaams Pedagogisch Instituut or SPI), a teaching college. In 1965, she was discovered as a poet at that college. Roemer travelled to the Netherlands the following year, and spent the next few years traveling back and forth between Suriname and the Netherlands (she also lived in The Hague) until the 1970s. She began publishing in Suriname in the early 1970s, but then quickly took up permanent residence in the Netherlands in 1975, after being fired from her teaching job for refusing to celebrate the Sinterklaas celebrations, which include a blackface character named Zwarte Piet.

Her only known political affiliation was from 1989 to 1990, when she was a member of the Green Party. During her affiliation with this party, known as the GroenLinks party in the Netherlands, she spent time in the city council of The Hague, but quickly left after a dispute with the party. Although she lived primarily in the Netherlands during this period, Roemer spent short amounts of time all across Europe, and she lived for short periods of time in Scotland, Belgium, and Italy. She returned to Suriname in 2006.

From the 2000s, Roemer published little, although she remained a large-looming figure within the zeitgeist of post-colonial literature in the Caribbean. In fact, Roemer disappeared entirely from the public eye and travelled the world for 15 years, with her "cat, laptop, and backpack". Her first public appearance in a long time was planned for the 2015 premiere of De wereld heeft gezicht verloren, a biographical documentary by Cindy Kerseborn. Kerseborn looked for Roemer on the Scottish island of Skye but finally found her in a Belgian monastery. Roemer did not show up for the premiere but sent a text message urging people to love one another.

Roemer died on 8 January 2026, at the age of 78.

== Career ==
In 1970 in Suriname, Roemer published her first book of poetry, Sasa mijn actuele zijn. Four years later, she published her first novel, Neem mij terug Suriname (Take Me Back Suriname). This novel became incredibly popular in its titular country, and put her on the map as a popular Surinamese writer. It was later rewritten as Nergens ergens in 1983 ("Nowhere somewhere"). Her breakthrough novel once she moved to the Netherlands was the fragmentary novel Over de gekte van een vrouw ("On the madness of a woman"), a work investigating identity and the oppression of women. This novel established her as a feminist writer and made her a role model for lesbians. It also addressed the pains and abuse endured by women in Suriname, with a focus on the physical form, and received much praise.

=== Roemer as a Surinamese writer ===
Between 1996 and 1998, she published a trilogy that is now among the best-known of her works, though it is no longer in print: Gewaagd leven (1996), Lijken op liefde (1997) and Was getekend (1998). The novels were published together as Roemers drieling ("Roemer's triplets", 2001). They are also known by the name of the series, the Onmogelijk moederland trilogy. The German translation of Lijken op liefde was awarded the LiBeratur Prize.

It is widely noted that Roemer's writing acts as political commentary on the state of Suriname after its liberation from the Netherlands in 1975, and the political strife that followed: A military dictatorship marked by the grisly December murders that sent a shockwave through Suriname which led to a civil war that lasted until 1992. This period marked a significant period in Roemer's life, and the Onmogelijk moederland reflects that by tying current violent events to the creation of Suriname as a colony. It paints the new nation with a history of violence that stretches back hundreds of years prior to its independence.

=== Roemer as a Caribbean writer ===
In addition to the previously mentioned significance of Roemer's works as political commentary, scholars such as Ineke Phaf-Rheinberger make the claim that Roemer is working to create a space of "repair" in post-colonial Suriname through her writing, as a way for the people of Suriname to feel a sense of connection over and remembrance of their violent origins and move forward in the construction of their nation.

It is also often discussed that Roemer's works fit into a larger conversation happening in the literary realm about Black Diaspora and how that shapes the "postcolonial perspective" in and about the Caribbean. It has been noted that because Roemer writes her novels and poems in Dutch, she is writing in the language of the colonizer, but she deconstructs that language by using the grammatical structures of the native Surinamese language of Sranan. Amongst her other important roles within the literary field of Caribbean writing, she is known for using the colonizer's language to advocate for the previously-colonized.

=== Later career ===
Roemer's literary output slowed with the turn of the century. Her autobiography, Zolang ik leef ben ik niet dood ("As long as I'm living I'm not dead"), appeared in 2004, and a collection of love poems called Afnemend ("Diminishing") was published in 2012, in only 125 copies. She also published an autobiography in 2016 centered on her time living nomadically between various locations in Scotland and the Netherlands entitled Liefde in tijden van gebrek, or, in English, Love in times of shortage. Most recently, Roemer's 2024 novel Off-White, translated from the Dutch by Lucy Scott and David McKay, was described by Publishers Weekly as "a thought-provoking portrait of a fraught familial and colonial history".

== Awards ==
Roemer won the P. C. Hooft Award for 2016 over the favored candidate, Arnon Grunberg, becoming the first Caribbean author to win the Dutch award. According to the jury, Roemer's novels are a literary imagining of the history of Suriname, a history that is not very well known in the Netherlands outside of the topics of slavery and the December murders but is "inextricably intertwined with the history of our country...and thus, by way of Roemer's unique oeuvre, with our literature". The jury added, "political engagement and literary experiment go hand in hand with Roemer". In 2021, Roemer received the Prijs der Nederlandse Letteren, becoming the first Surinamese winner. The jury's nomination states: "With her novels, plays and poems Astrid H. Roemer occupies a unique position in the Dutch literary landscape. Her work is unconventional, poetic and lived through. Roemer succeeds in connecting themes from recent national history, such as corruption, tension, guilt, colonization and decolonization, with small history, the story on a human scale."

In September 2023, the English translation of On a Woman's Madness, by Lucy Scott (published by Two Lines Press), was longlisted for the National Book Award for Translated Literature. In 2025, it was longlisted for the International Booker Prize. The gap between the original-language publication of this work in 1982 and its International Booker longlisting in 2025 is 43 years, the longest in the award's history.

== Publications ==
=== English translations ===
- A Name for Love. Novel. Translated by Rita Gircour. Amsterdam: In de Knipscheer (courtesy ed.), 1994. ISBN 90-6773-018-1.
- The Order of the Day. A novella. Translated by Rita Gircour, with an introduction by Michiel van Kempen. Amsterdam: In de Knipscheer (courtesy ed.), 1994. ISBN 90-6773-017-3.
- On a Woman's Madness. Translated by Lucy Scott. San Francisco, CA: Two Lines Press, 2023. ISBN 978-1-949641-43-1.
- Off-White. Translated by Scott and David McKay. San Francisco, CA: Two Lines Press, 2024. ISBN 978-1949641257.

=== In Dutch ===
The works of Roemer based on her Digital Library for Dutch Literature profile:

- 1970: Sasa mijn actuele zijn (Sasa my present being)
- 1974: Neem mij terug, Suriname (Take me back, Suriname)
- 1975: De wereld heeft gezicht verloren (The world has lost face)
- 1982: Over de gekte van een vrouw (On the madness of a woman)
- 1983: Nergens ergens (Nowhere somewhere)
- 1985: En wat dan nog?! (And so what?!)
- 1985: Noordzee Blues (North Sea Blues)
- 1987: Levenslang gedicht (Lifelong poem)
- 1987: Waarom zou je huilen mijn lieve, lieve... (Why would you cry my dear, dear...)
- 1987: Wat heet anders (What is so different)
- 1988: De achtentwintigste dag (The twenty-eighth day)
- 1988: De orde van de dag (The order of the day)
- 1988: Het spoor van de jakhals (The trace of the jackall)
- 1989: Alles wat gelukkig maakt (All that makes happy)
- 1989: Oost West Holland Best (East West Holland Best)
- 1990: Een naam voor de liefde (A name for love)
- 1991: Dichter bij mij schreeuw ik (Closer to me I'll scream)
- 1993: Niets wat pijn doet (Nothing that hurts)
- 1996: Gewaagd leven (Daring life)
- 1997: Lijken op liefde (Looks like love)
- 1997: Suriname (Suriname)
- 1998: Was getekend (Signed)
- 2001: 'Miauw' ('Meow')
- 2004: Zolang ik leef ben ik niet dood (As long as I live I'm not dead)
- 2019: Gebroken wit (Off-White)
- 2023: DealersDochter

== See also ==
- Surinamese literature
