= Paul de Wispelaere =

Flemish writer

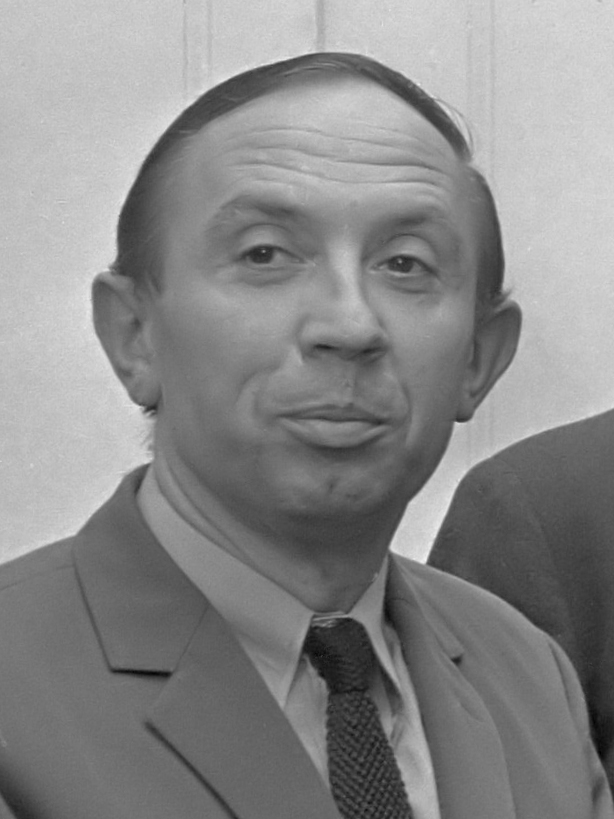
Paul De Wispelaere (1968)

Paul de Wispelaere (4 July 1928 – 2 December 2016) was a Flemish writer.

Born in Bruges, he attended high school at the Sint-Lodewijkscollege in Bruges, where he graduated in Greek-Latin. He studied Germanic philology at the University of Ghent and obtained a PhD in 1974. De Wispelaere started his professional career at the school for teachers in Bruges, and from 1972 until 1992 he lectured in Dutch literature at the University of Antwerp.

He made his literary debut with stories which were published in magazines. He wrote contributions to Dietsche Warande en Belfort, De Tafelronde, Diagram, Komma, Nieuw Vlaams Tijdschrift, Het Vaderland, De Vlaamse Gids, Kunst van Nu, Nieuw Wereldtijdschrift, and Literatuur'. His autobiographically prose is related to the French nouveau roman, as in Scherzando ma non tropo (1959) and Mijn levende schaduw (E: My living shadow) (1965).

== Bibliography ==
- Fantasia (short story, 1954)
- Lautering (short story, 1954)
- Lea (short story, 1954)
- De verukkelijke glimlach (short story, 1955)
- De andere man (short story, 1956)
- Viviane (short story, 1956)
- Het examen (short story, 1956)
- Scherzando ma non tropo (novel, 1959)
- Het short story van Bérénica (short story, 1960)
- Victor J. Brunclair (essay, 1960)
- Hendrik Marsman (essay, 1961)
- Een eiland worden (novel, 1963)
- Mijn levende schaduw (novel, 1965)
- Literatuur als therapie en mythe (essay, 1965)
- Dagboekfragmenten (diary, 1966)
- Het Perzisch tapijt (essay, 1966)
- Het vat der Danaïden (essay, 1967)
- Met kritisch oog (critiques, 1967)
- Facettenoog (kritieken, 1968)
- Drie realistische fabels van Sybren Polet (essay, 1968)
- René Gysen of het gevecht met de realiteit (essay, 1970)
- Paul-tegenpaul 1969-1970 (dagboek, 1970)
- Een Vlaming bekijkt Nederland (essay, 1972)
- Karel Van de Woestijne. De boer die sterft en andere verhalen (anthology, 1973)
- Jef Geeraerts (essay, 1973)
- Het proza 1966-1971 (essay, 1973)
- Jan Walraevens (essay, 1974)
- Louis Paul Boon, tedere anarchist (essay, 1976)
- Een dag op het land (novel, 1976)
- Wereld in teksten 1 t/m 6 (anthology, 1973–1977)
- Tussen tuin en wereld (novel, 1979)
- Mijn huis is nergens meer (novel, 1982)
- Ivo Michiels. Het afscheid (essay, 1982)
- Indruk 83. Wat schrijvers schrijven (anthology, 1982)
- Vlaamse verhalen na 1965 (anthology, 1984)
- Brieven uit Nergenshuizen (novel, 1987)
- De broek van Sartre en andere essays (essays, 1987)
- Het verkoolde alfabet (diary, 1992)
- Tekst en context (essay, 1992)
- Bar en bizar. Ontsluierde geheimen (anthology, 1993)
- En de liefste dingen nog verder (novel, 1998)
- Herman De Coninck. Het proza (2 delen, anthology, 2000)
- Het land van de mosseleters. 150 jaar Vlaamse vertelkunst (anthology, 2002)

== Awards ==
- 1980 - Staatsprijs voor Vlaams verhalend proza
- 1987 - Staatsprijs voor kritiek en essay
- 1998 - Prijs der Nederlandse Letteren

== See also ==
- Flemish literature

== Sources ==
- Paul de Wispelaere (in Dutch)
- Paul de Wispelaere
