= Isidoor Teirlinck =

Belgian writer

Isidoor Teirlinck (Zegelsem, 2 January 1851 - Forest, Brussels, 27 June 1934) was a Belgian writer. He is best known for his work on folklore.

Isidoor Teirlinck went to school in Lier. He married with Oda van Nieuwenhove and he was the father of the writer Herman Teirlinck. He became a teacher and taught in Serskamp, Drogenbos, Saint-Josse-ten-Noode, and from 1875 onwards, he was teacher in mathematics and physics in Brussels. He wrote several books, together with his brother-in-law Reimond Stijns, as Teirlinck-Stijns. Their most famous novel was Arm Vlaanderen (English: Poor Flanders), which they published in 1884.

== Bibliography ==
- Wie niet hooren wil moet voelen (1873)
- Bertha van den Schoolmeester (1877)
- Frans Steen, zedenroman (1878)
- Gedichten en Novellen, eerste deel, Bladknoppen (1879)
- Lina Donders (1879)
- Baas Colder (1879)
- Aldenardiana, Novellen uit het Zuiden van Oost-Vlaanderen (1880)
- Lucia Staps (1882)
- Kruidkunde :, een handboek voor onderwijzers en leerlingen-onderwijzers (1882)
- Bloemenleven (1882)
- Uit het leven van ons Volk (1882)
- Stella (1883)
- Arm Vlaanderen (1884)
- Bloeiende reuzen (1885)
- Blozende kriekse (1886)
- Woordenboek van het Bargoensch (1886)
- Cilia (1888)
- Mirza-Schaffy's liederen ten love des wijns (1888)
- Molleke (1889)
- Onze beste vrienden (1891)
- Naar het land van belofte! (1894)
- Van drie oudjes (1899)
- Le folklore flamand: Folklore mythologique (1890)
- Le folklore flamand: Contes flamands (1890)
- Lastige kerels en brave gasten (1901)
- Plantenkultus (1904)
- Kinderspel en kinderlust in Zuid-Nederland (1902–1908)
- Zuid-Oostvlaandersch idioticon (1908–1924)
- Brabantsch sagenboek (1909–1912)
- De toponymie van den Reinaert (1910–1912)
- Klank- en vormleer van het Zuid-Oostvlaandersch dialect (1924)
- Flora Diabolica (1930)
- Flora Magica (1930)

== See also ==
- Flemish literature

== Sources ==
- Biographisch woordenboek der Noord- en Zuidnederlandsche letterkunde, 1888–1891, F. Jos. van den Branden en J.G. Frederiks,
- Letterkundig woordenboek voor Noord en Zuid, 1941, K. ter Laan,
- De Nederlandse en Vlaamse auteurs, 1985, G.J. van Bork en P.J. Verkruijsse,
- Isidoor Teirlinck
