= Reimond Stijns =

Belgian writer

Reimond Stijns (10 May 1850, in Mullem – 12 December 1905, in Molenbeek-Saint-Jean) was a Belgian writer.

He started his professional career as a teacher in 1870, first in Bevere (Oudenaarde), and afterwards back in Molenbeek-Saint-Jean. In 1883, he became study master, later teacher Dutch at the Koninklijk athenaeum (English: Royal athenaeum) in Brussels. Initially as a writer, he worked together with his brother-in-law Isidoor Teirlinck, who was also a teacher in Brussels. Together they published Arm Vlaanderen (English: Poor Flanders) in 1884, a political novel on the educational struggle between Belgian Catholics and liberals. As from 1886 he went his own way, and produced his best work, of which Hard labeur (1904) is best known. Reimond Stijns was the first naturalistic writer of Flanders, but his work was also still influenced by romanticism.

== Bibliography ==
- Arm Vlaanderen (1884)
- Schetsen en verhalen (1886)
- Broodnijd. Schetsen en verhalen II (1887)
- Ruwe liefde (1887)
- In de ton (1891)
- Klein leven (1893)
- Driften (1896)
- Hard labeur (1904)

== See also ==
- Flemish literature
