= Prijs der Nederlandse Letteren =

Dutch-language literary award

The Prijs der Nederlandse Letteren ("Dutch Literature Prize") is awarded every three years to an author from the Netherlands, Belgium or, since 2005, Suriname writing in Dutch. It is considered the most prestigious literary award in the Dutch-speaking world, and the award is presented alternately by the reigning Dutch and Belgian monarchs.

The €40,000 prize is administered by the Dutch Language Union. The jury comprises three Dutch members, three Flemish members and one from Suriname. The chair alternates between a Flemish and Dutch jury member.

Until 2001 the prize was awarded alternately to a Flemish and a Dutch author. Subsequently, the four winners have all been Dutch; but the winner for 2012, Leonard Nolens, is Flemish.

== List of winners ==
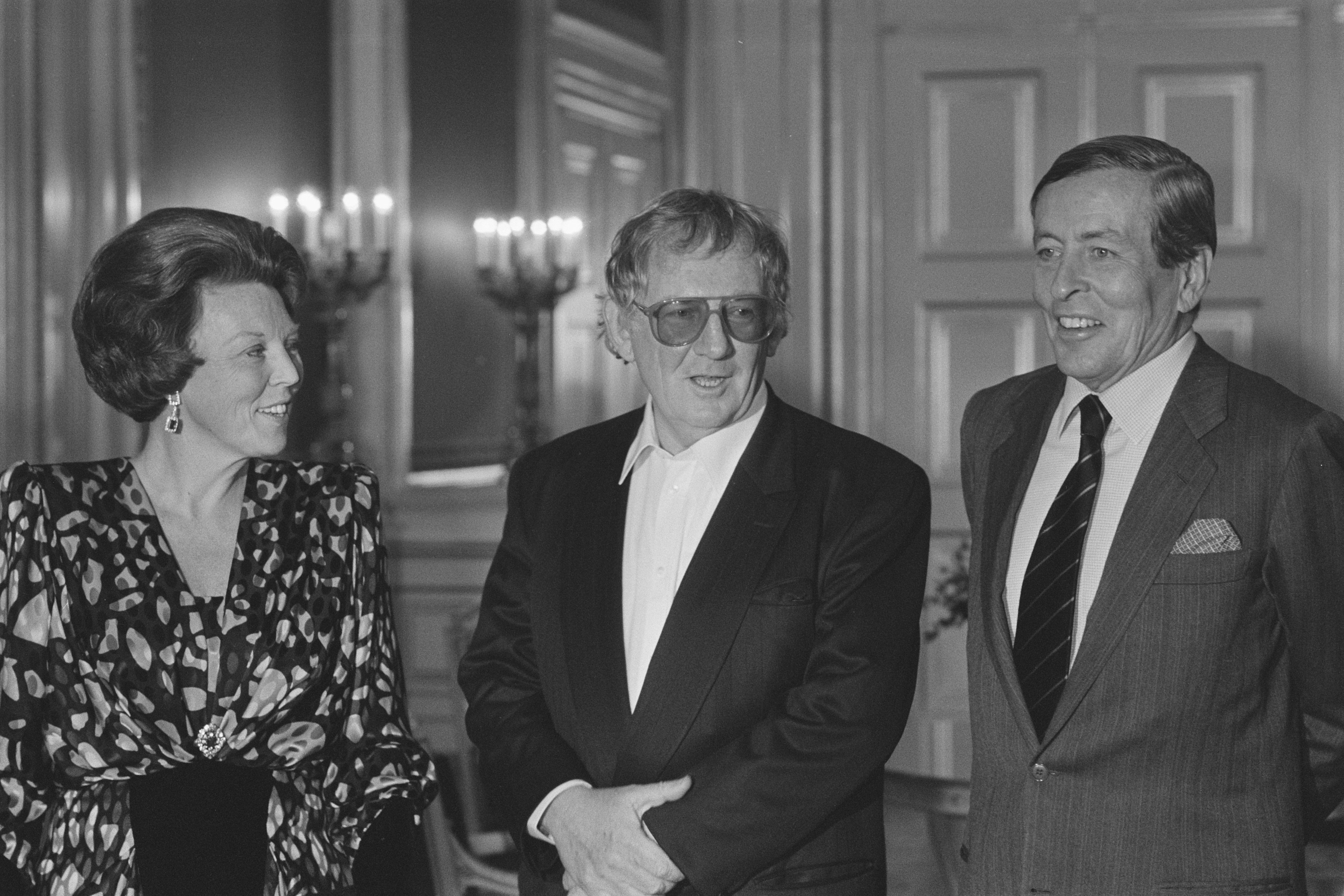
Hugo Claus (1986)

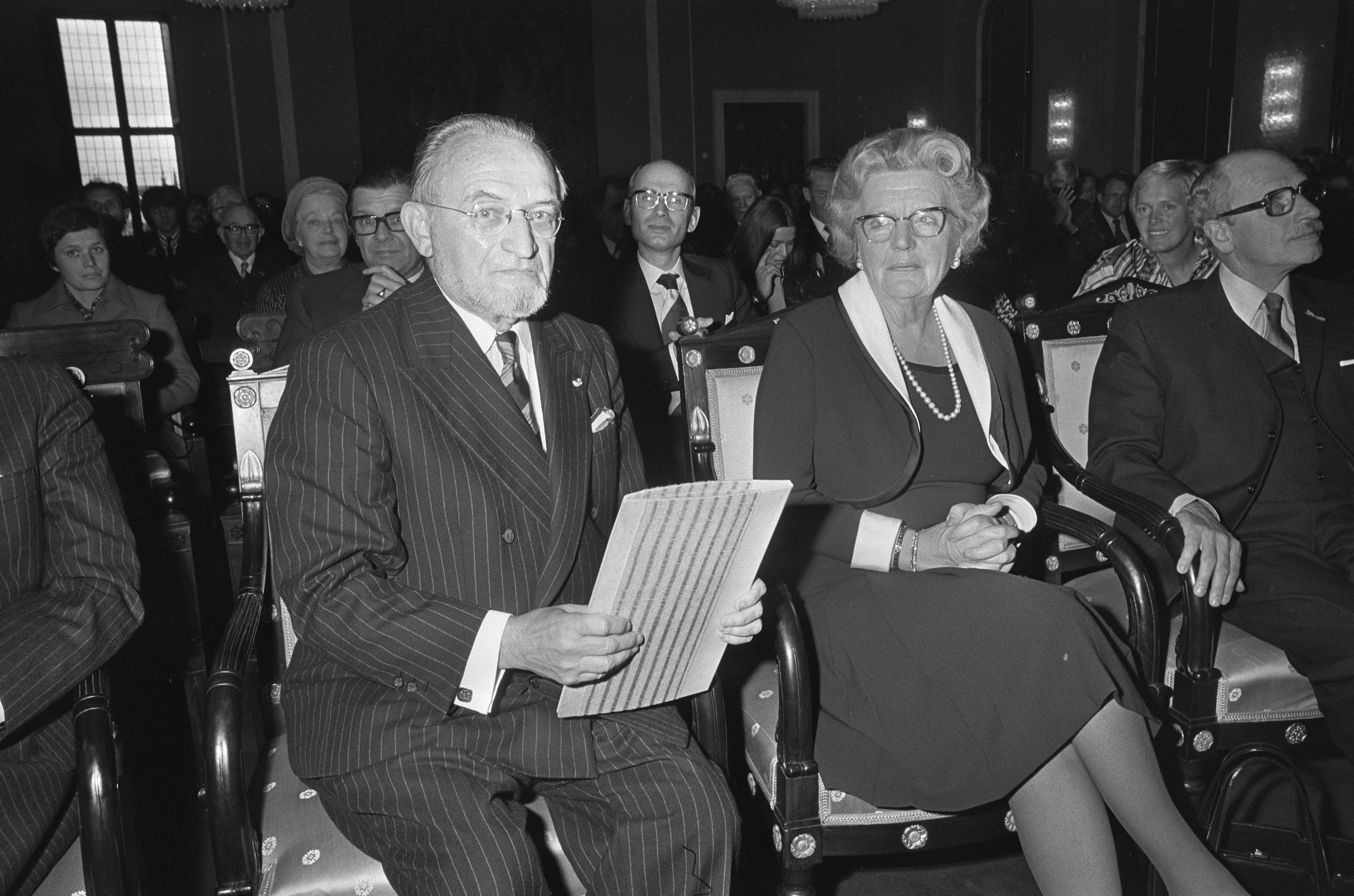
Marnix Gijsen (1974)

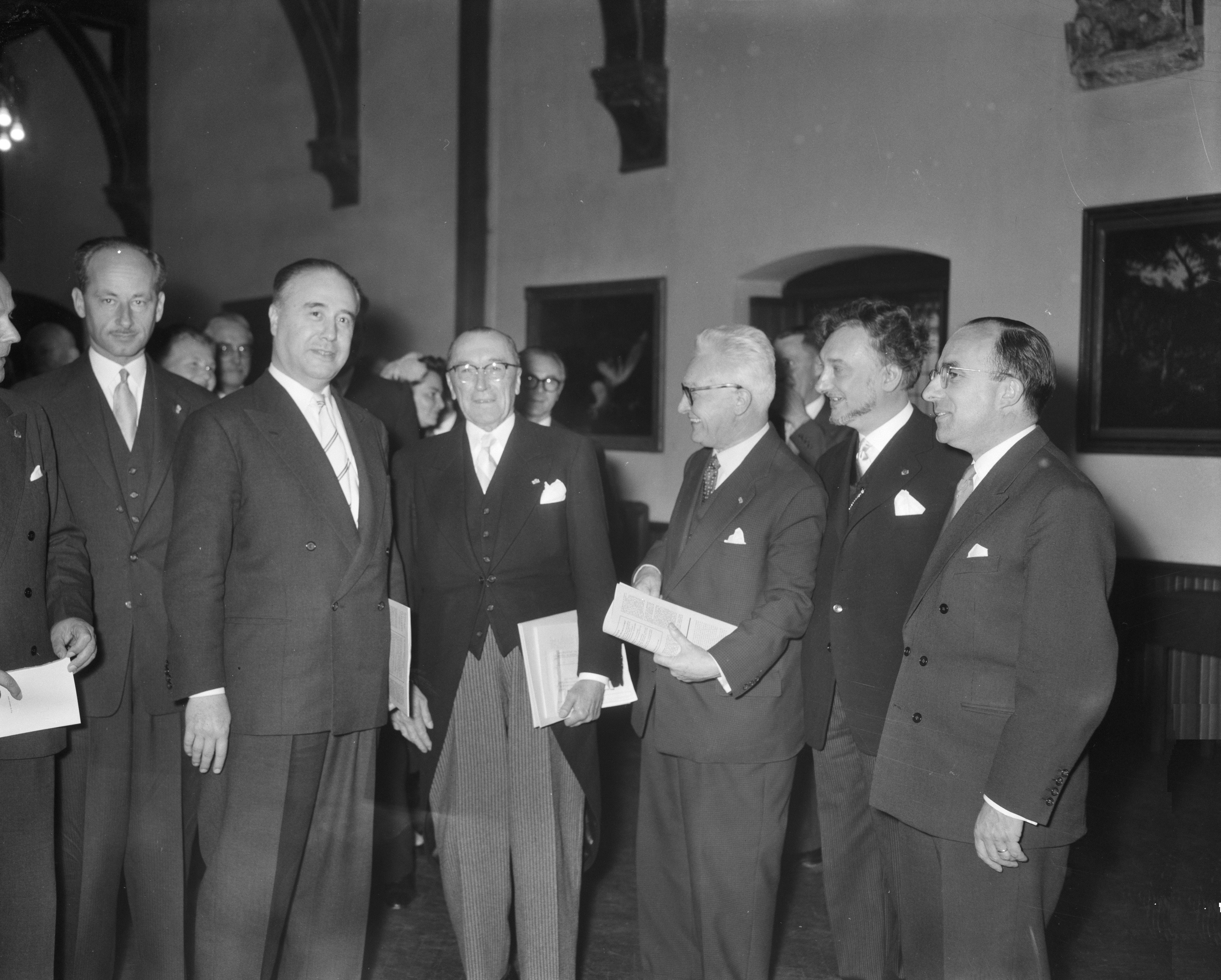
Herman Teirlinck (1956)

- 1956: Herman Teirlinck
- 1959: Adriaan Roland Holst
- 1962: Stijn Streuvels
- 1965: J.C. Bloem
- 1968: Gerard Walschap
- 1971: Simon Vestdijk
- 1974: Marnix Gijsen
- 1977: Willem Frederik Hermans
- 1980: Maurice Gilliams
- 1983: Lucebert
- 1986: Hugo Claus
- 1989: Gerrit Kouwenaar
- 1992: Christine D'Haen
- 1995: Harry Mulisch
- 1998: Paul De Wispelaere
- 2001: Gerard Reve (King Albert II of Belgium refused to present the prize to Reve because his partner was suspected of pedophilia)
- 2004: Hella S. Haasse
- 2007: Jeroen Brouwers (declined)
- 2009: Cees Nooteboom
- 2012: Leonard Nolens
- 2015: Remco Campert
- 2018: Judith Herzberg
- 2021: Astrid Roemer
- 2024: Tom Lanoye
