= Marnix Gijsen =

Belgian writer

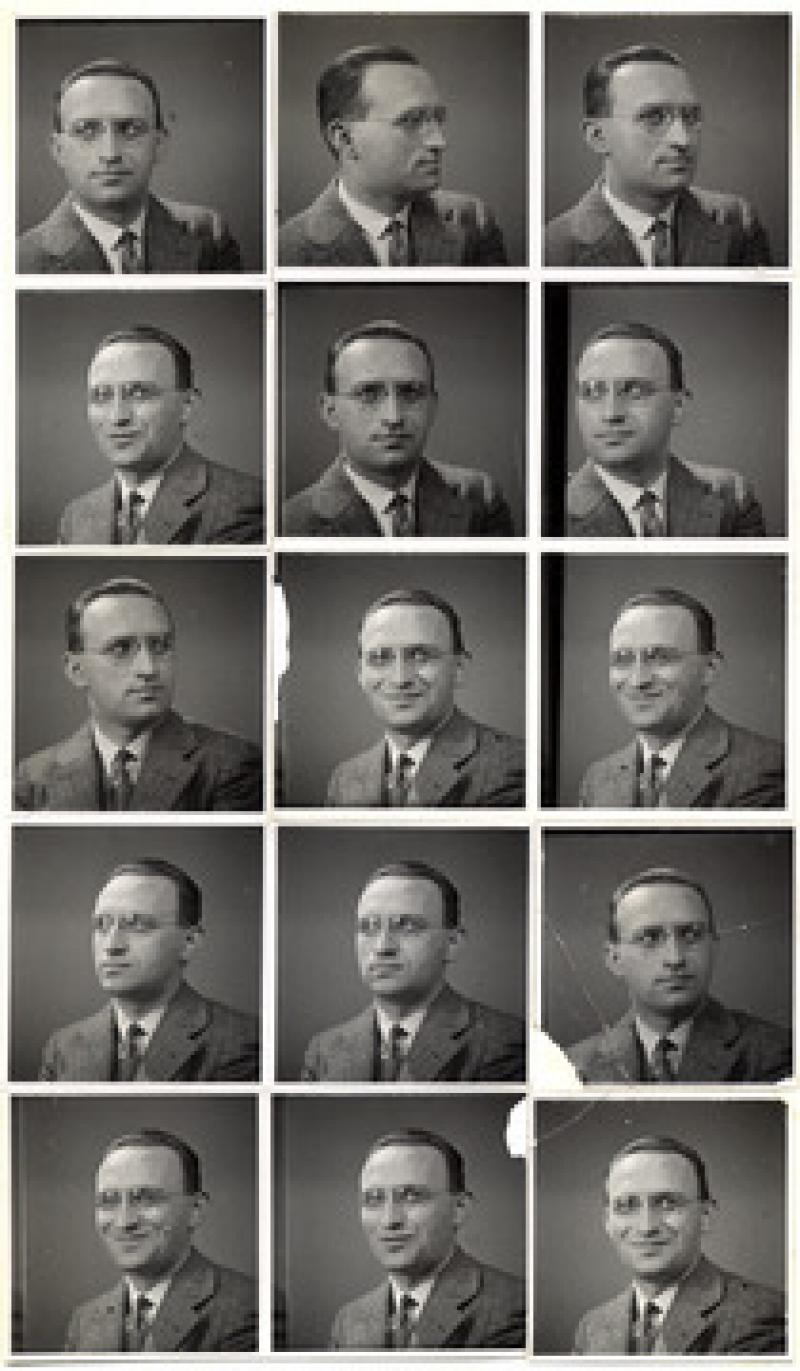
- Marnix Gijsen in 1930
- Born: Joannes Alphonsius Albertus Goris; 20 October 1899; Antwerp
- Died: 29 September 1984 (aged 84); Lubbeek
- Education: Leuven University
- Occupation: writer

Marnix Gijsen (20 October 1899 – 29 September 1984) was a Belgian writer. His real name was Joannes Alphonsius Albertus Goris; his pseudonym relates to Marnix van Sint Aldegonde and the surname of his mother (Gijsen).

== Early years ==
Gijsen was born in 1899 in Antwerp, Belgium. In his youth he received a strict Roman Catholic education, at the Jesuit college of Saint Ignacio in Antwerp, but in 1917 he was punished heavily (consilium abeundi, E: 'advice to leave') for his militant Flemish activism during World War I. In 1925 he went to the Catholic University of Leuven, where he obtained a PhD in history and moral sciences with a dissertation on Études sur les colonies marchandes méridionales (portugaises, espagnoles, italiennes) à Anvers de 1488 à 1567. He went on to study at the University of Freiburg, Paris (Sorbonne) and London (London School of Economics).

== Career ==
From 1928 until 1933, he was a civil servant at the municipal authorities of Antwerp, including principal private secretary of the mayor of Antwerp (1928–1932). Subsequently, he worked at the civil service in Brussels from 1932 to 1939, where he was Chief of Cabinet of the Minister of Economics from 1932 until 1937, and from 1939 up to 1941 he was Commissioner-General for tourism.

During the Nazi occupation of Belgium he went into exile. From 1942 until 1964, he lived in New York City (United States) as Belgian commissioner for information and in addition he was plenipotentiary minister. On the Belgian public radio, as The voice from America, he had a weekly radio spot on Saturday night.

== Literary career ==
Marnix Gijsen started his literary career as a poet within the expressionist group Ruimte (Space) their illustrated magazine. His most important poem was Lof-litanie van de Heilige Franciscus van Assisië (Praise of Saint Francis of Assisi) (1920). In his early period he came into contact with the Flemish poets Paul van Ostaijen, Karel van den Oever, and Victor J. Brunclair. After a study trip to the United States, he wrote the story Ontdek Amerika (Discover America) (1927). He wrote essays on art, such as on Karel van Mander (1922), Jozef Cantré, (1933), and Hans Memlinc (1939), and he wrote daily literary criticisms. He was a close friend of the Belgian writer Suzanne Lilar, and he wrote the afterword in the 1976 Dutch translation of Lilar's "Le Couple" (1963).

During World War II, he broke with his Roman catholic faith, and adopted moral values and an attitude of life based on stoicism. This became apparent in his first novel Het boek van Joachim van Babylon (The book of Joachim van Babylon), which was first published in 1947. From then on, he published a series of novels, such as Goed en kwaad (Good and evil, 1951), Lament for Agnes (1951), De diaspora (The Diaspora, 1961), Zelfportret, gevleid natuurlijk (Self-portrait, flattered of course) (1965) and De parel der Diplomatie (The Pearl of Diplomacy). In 1968, he wrote the theatre play Helena op Itahaka. On his relation to Catholicism, he wrote De afvallige (The renegade) and Biecht van een heiden (Confession of a heathen), which were both published in 1971.

His literary work is a testimony of a moralist, who, in spite of everything, goes his own way and holds high the moral values of good and courage against evil. His literary work was awarded the Belgian national prize for literature in 1959, and 1969 and the Prijs der Nederlandse Letteren in 1974. In 1975, he was knighted and became a Baron.

Gijsen died in Lubbeek, Belgium in 1984.

== Bibliography ==
(Books by Gijsen / Goris in English translation)

- Marnix Gijsen: The book of Joachim of Babylon. Transl. by Fernand G. Renier and Anne Cliff. London, East and West Library, 1951
- Marnix Gijsen: Some scholarly comments on the sayings of the Dutch poet Leo Vroman: Liever heimwee dan Holland. The Hague, Stols, 1955
- Marnix Gijsen: Lament for Agnes. Transl. by W. James-Gerth. Boston, Twayne, 1975. ISBN 0-8057-8150-1
- Jan-Albert Goris: Belgium in Bondage (1943), introduction by James Hilton
- The miracle of Beatrice (introduction by Jan-Albert Goris) (1944)
- Jan-Albert Goris: Strangers should not whisper. New York, Fischer, 1945
- Jan-Albert Goris: The liberation of Belgium (1945)
- Jan-Albert Goris: The growth of the Belgian nation (1946)
- Jan-Albert Goris & Julius S. Held: Rubens in America. Antwerp, 1947
- Jan-Albert Goris: Belgian letters. A short survey of creative writing in the French and Dutch languages in Belgium (1946)
- Jan-Albert Goris: Modern sculpture in Belgium (1948)
- Jan-Albert Goris: Portraits of Flemish Masters in American collections (1949)
- Jan-Albert Goris: Drawings by modern Belgian artists (1951)
- Jan-Albert Goris: Candid opinions on sundry subjects. An anthology of his editorial writings for the Belgian trade review, 1954-1964. Amsterdam, Meulenhoff, 1964

== See also ==
- Flemish literature

== Sources ==
- G.J. van Bork en P.J. Verkruijsse, De Nederlandse en Vlaamse auteurs (1985)
- Marnix Gijsen
- Marnix Gijsen
