= Christine D'haen =

Flemish author and poet

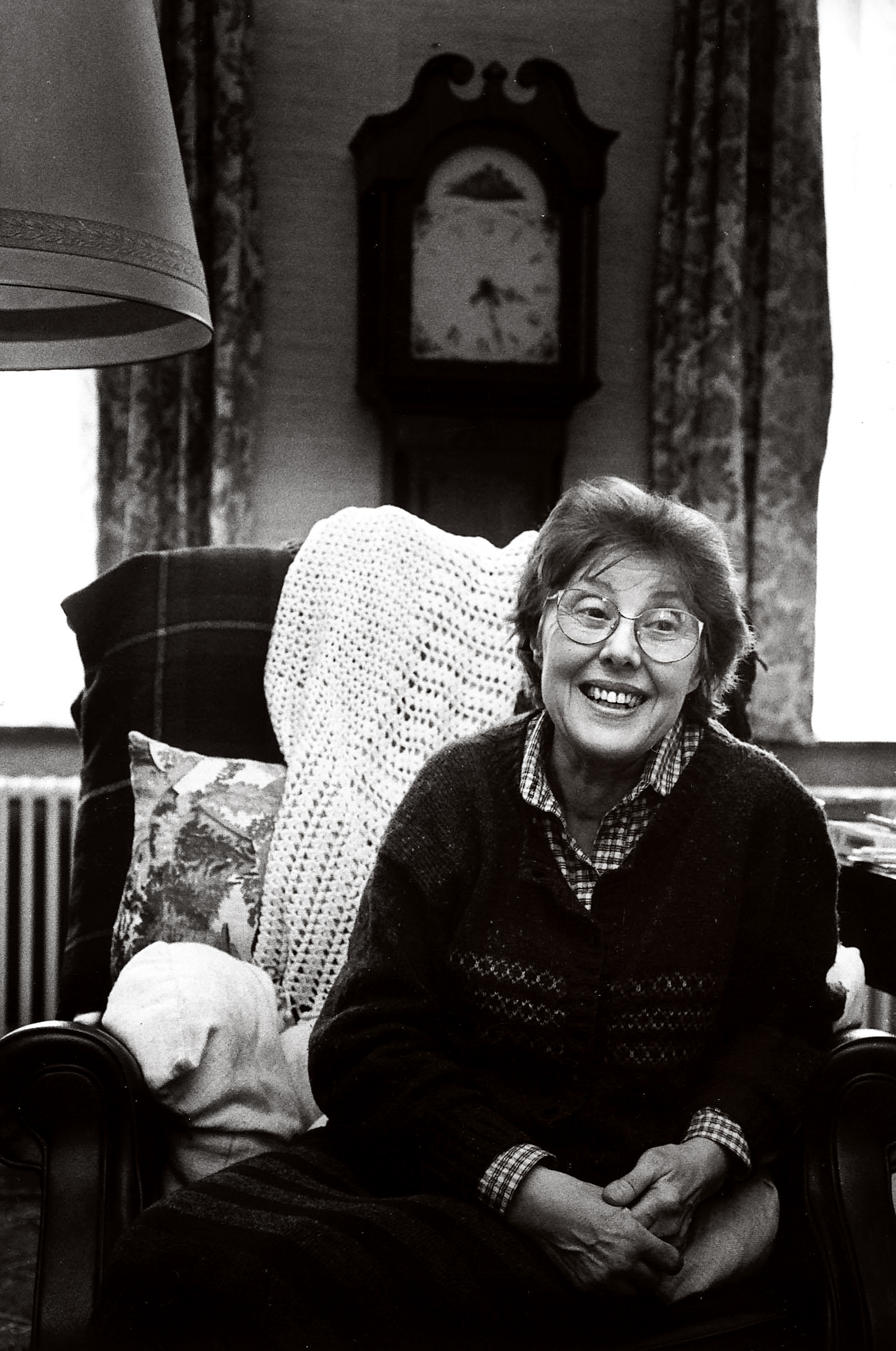
- Born: 25 October 1923; Sint-Amandsberg, Belgium
- Died: 3 September 2009 (aged 85); Bruges, Belgium
- Occupations: poet, writer

Christine D'haen (25 October 1923 – 3 September 2009) was a Flemish author and poet. She was born in Sint-Amandsberg and died at Bruges.

D'haen studied Germanic philology at the University of Ghent and continued her studies in Amsterdam and Edinburgh. She settled in Bruges and became a teacher at high school. She made an inventory of the handwritings of Guido Gezelle while working at the Gezelle archive. She wrote a biography of Guido Gezelle and also translated work of Hugo Claus into English.

In 1958 her first book of poetry, Gedichten 1946–1958 (Poems 1946–1958), was published.

== Bibliography ==
- Gedichten 1946-1958 (1958)
- Vanwaar zal ik u lof toezingen? (1966)
- Gezelle, Poems/Gedichten (1971)
- Ick sluit van daegh een ring (1975)
- Onyx (1983)
- De wonde in 't hert (1988)
- Mirages (1989)
- Zwarte sneeuw (1989)
- Duizend-en-drie (1992)
- Een brokaten brief (1992)
- Merencolie (1992)
- Morgane (1995)
- Een paal, een steen (1996)
- De zoon van de Zon (1997)
- Bérénice (1998)
- Dodecaëder/Dantis meditatio (1998)
- Het geheim dat ik draag (1998)
- Kalkmarkt 6, De stad en Het begin (1999)
- Het huwelijk (novel, 2000)

== Awards ==
- 1951 – Arkprijs van het Vrije Woord
- 1991 – Anna Bijnsprijs of the Dutch literature
- 1992 – Prijs der Nederlandse Letteren

== See also ==
- Flemish literature
