= Karel van de Woestijne =

Flemish writer (1878–1929)

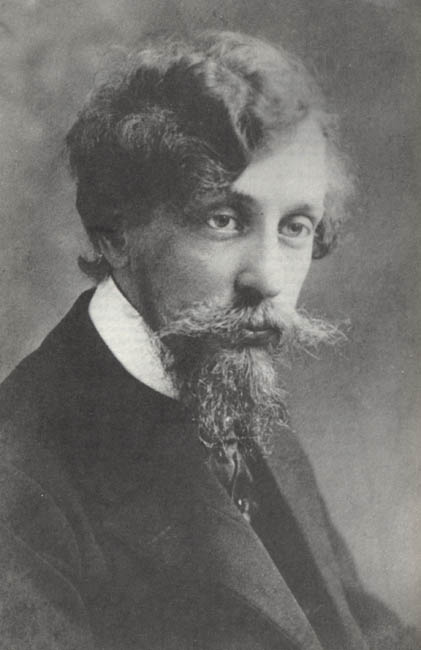
- Born: Carolus Petrus Eduardus Maria van de Woestijne; 10 March 1878; Ghent, Belgium
- Died: 24 August 1929 (aged 51); Zwijnaarde, Belgium
- Education: Ghent University
- Occupations: Writer, journalist, professor
- Relatives: Gustave van de Woestijne (brother)
- Writing career
- Notable works: Het Vaderhuis (1903); De boer die sterft (1918); De leemen torens (1928)
- Notable awards: Officer in the Order of the Crown (1923)
- Movement: Symbolism

Carolus Petrus Eduardus Maria "Karel" van de Woestijne (Dutch: [ˈkaːrəl vɑn də ʋuˈstɛinə]; Ghent, 10 March 1878 – Zwijnaarde, 24 August 1929) was a Flemish writer and brother of the painter Gustave van de Woestijne. He went to high school at the Koninklijk Athenaeum (E:Royal Athenaeum) at the Ottogracht in Ghent. He also studied Germanic philology at the University of Ghent, where he came into contact with French symbolism. He lived at Sint-Martens-Latem from April 1900 to January 1904, and from April 1905 to November 1906. Here he wrote Laetemsche brieven over de lente, for his friend Adolf Herckenrath (1901). In 1907 he moved to Brussels, and in 1915 he moved to Pamel, where he wrote De leemen torens together with Herman Teirlinck.

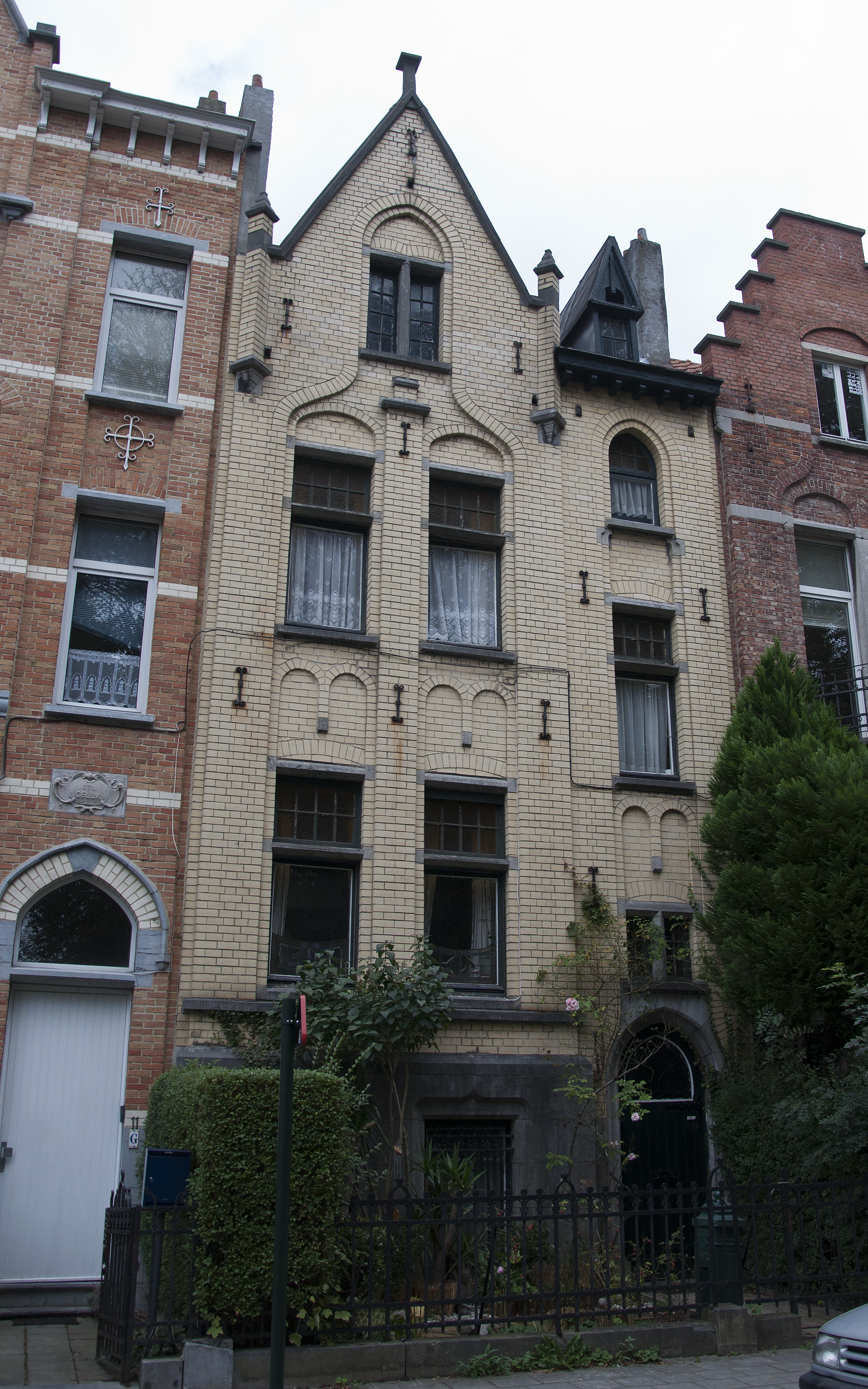
Karel van de Woestijne lived in this house in Brussels

From 1906 he was correspondent of the Nieuwe Rotterdamsche Courant in Brussels. Between 1920 and 1929 he taught history of Dutch literature at the University of Ghent. He was editor of successively the illustrated magazines of Van Nu en Straks (second range, 1896-1901) and Vlaanderen (1903-1907). Of the illustrated magazine Vlaanderen he became secretary of the redaction in 1906. From 1925 until his death in 1929, he lived in Zwijnaarde, nearby Ghent. He was buried in the Cemetery of Campo Santo.

== Honours ==
- 1923 : Officer in the Order of the Crown.

== Bibliography ==
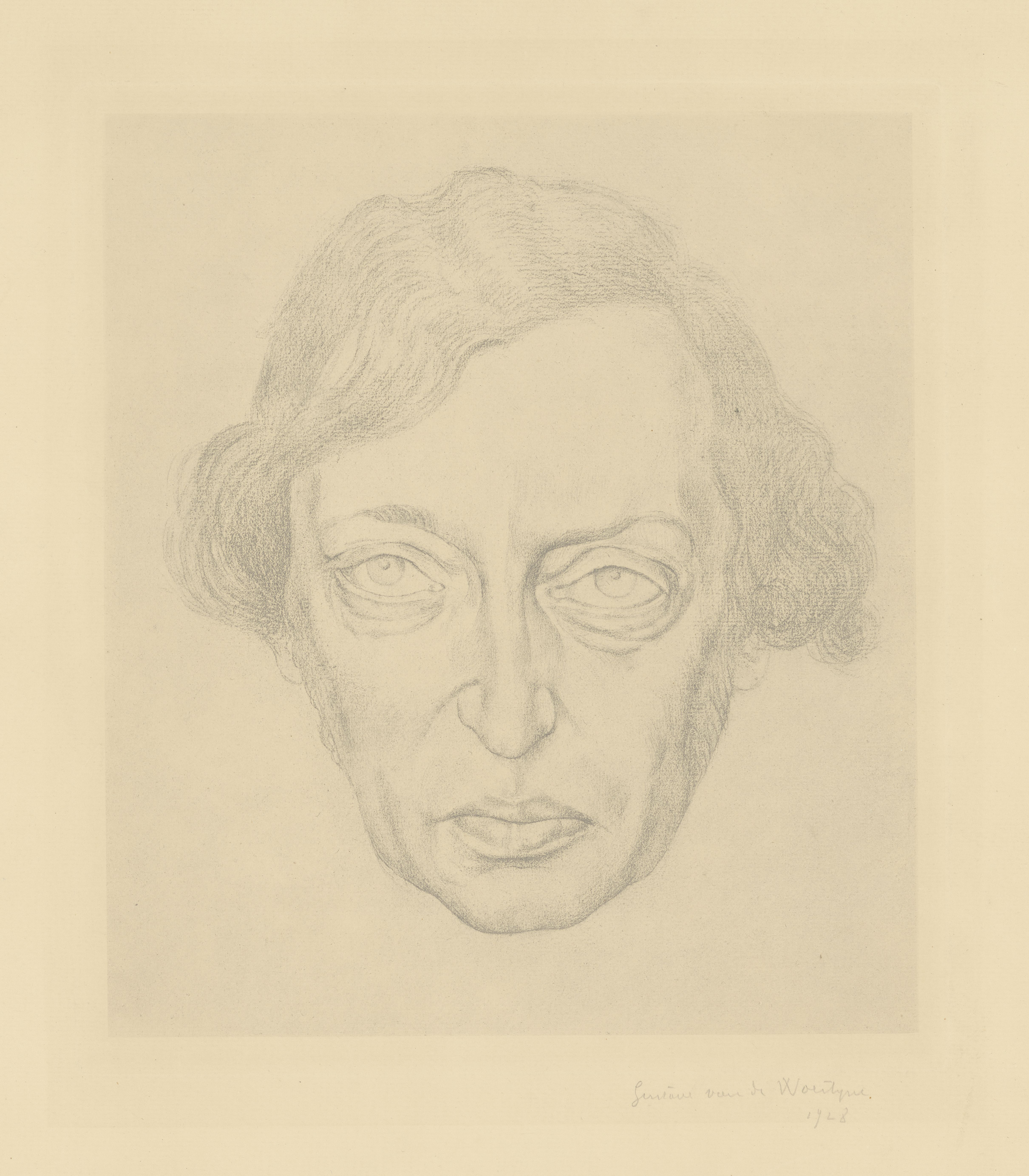
Gustave van de Woestyne - Portret van Karel van de Woestyne (1878-1929) - Koninklijke Bibliotheek van België - S.IV 485

- Laethemse brieven over de lente (1901)
- Het Vaderhuis (1903)
- De boomgaard der vogelen en der vruchten (1905)
- Janus met het dubbele voorhoofd (1908)
- De gulden schaduw (1910)
- Afwijkingen (1910)
- Kunst en geest in Vlaanderen (1911)
- Interludiën I (1912)
- Interludiën II (1914)
- De boer die sterft (1918) (translated by Paul Vincent as The Dying Peasant, 2018, ISBN 978-1943813766)
- Goddelijke verbeeldingen (1918)
- De bestendige aanwezigheid (1918)
- De modderen man (1920)
- Substrata (1924)
- Zon in de rug (1924)
- Beginselen der chemie (1925)
- God aan zee (1926)
- Het menschelijk brood (1923)
- Christophorus (1926)
- Het zatte hart (1926)
- Epibasis (1927-1929)
- De leemen torens (1928)
- De schroeflijn (1928)
- Het bergmeer (1928)
- De nieuwe Esopet (1932)
- Over schrijvers en boeken (1933)
- Proza (omvattend : De boer die sterft, Christophorus, De heilige van het getal) (1933)
- Verzameld werk (1928-1933)
- Een bundeltje lyrische gedichten (1936 en 1950)
- Romeo of De minnaar der liefde (1941)
- Proza (omvattend : De boer die sterft, Goddelijke verbeeldingen I) (1942)
- Nagelaten gedichten (1943)
- Verhalen (1944)
- Verzameld werk (8 delen, 1948-1950)
- Verzamelde gedichten (1953)
- Keur uit het werk van Karel Van de Woestijne (1953)
- Journalistiek. Brieven aan de Nieuwe Rotterdamsche Courant
- Verzamelde gedichten (1978)
- Brieven aan Lode Outrop (1985)

== See also ==
- Flemish literature

== Sources ==
- Karel van de Woestijne
- Karel van de Woestijne

Specific
