= List of Dutch-language writers =

This list of Dutch writers includes authors who have written works in the Dutch language.

In cases where the writer uses a pseudonym, the real name is added between brackets.

== Netherlands writers and poets ==
=== A-B ===
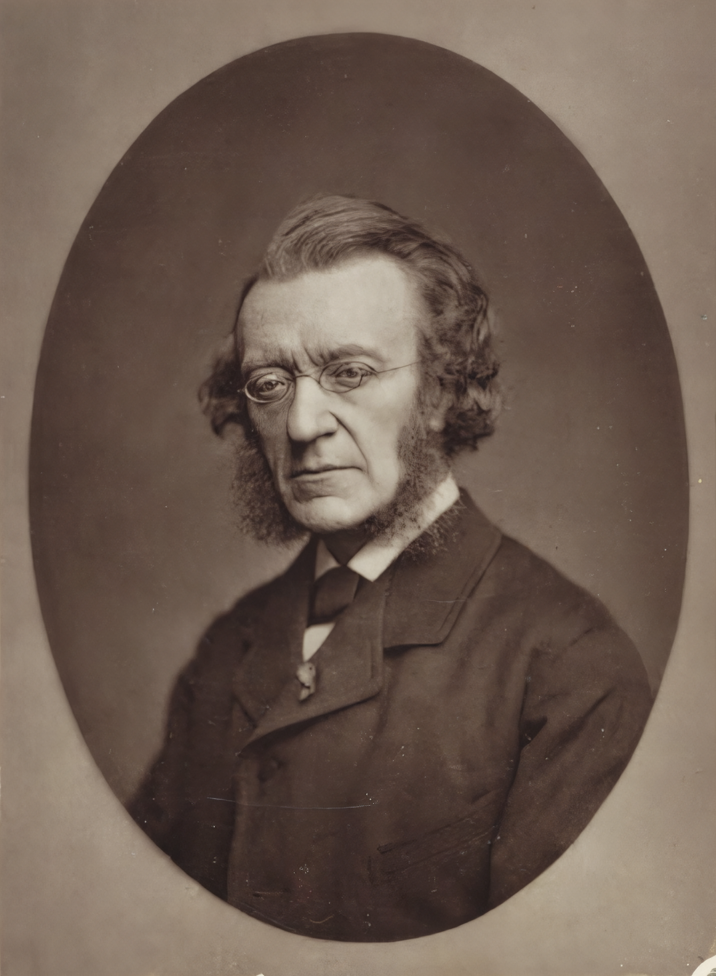
Joseph Albert Alberdingk Thijm

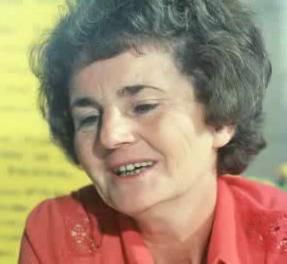
Thea Beckman

- Bertus Aafjes
- Kader Abdolah
- Gerrit Achterberg
- Carel Steven Adama van Scheltema
- Jan van Aken
- Joseph Albert Alberdingk Thijm
- Arnold Aletrino
- Robert Anker
- Jan Arends
- Simone Atangana Bekono
- A. C. Baantjer
- Marijn Backer
- Hassan Bahara
- Sevtap Baycılı
- Beatrice of Nazareth
- Thea Beckman
- Nicolaas Beets
- J. Bernlef (Hendrik Jan Marsman)
- Cornelis de Bie
- Paul Biegel
- Aristide von Bienefeldt
- Maarten Biesheuvel
- Carli Biessels
- J.C. Bloem
- Marion Bloem
- Godfried Bomans
- Ferdinand Bordewijk
- Anna Louisa Geertruida Bosboom-Toussaint
- Hafid Bouazza
- Menno ter Braak
- Hugo Brandt Corstius
- Gerbrand Adriaensz Bredero
- Jan ten Brink
- Jeroen Brouwers
- Boudewijn Büch
- Jacob Buyens van Mol
- Conrad Busken Huet

=== C-F ===
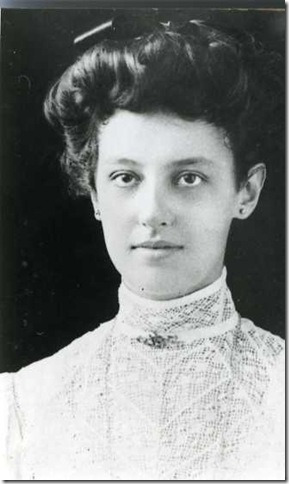
Maria Dermoût

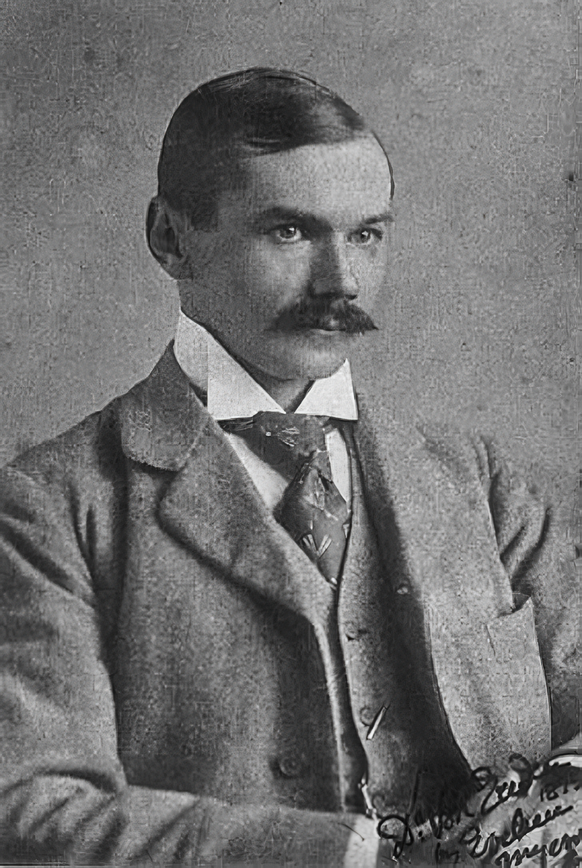
Frederik van Eeden

- Jan Campert
- Remco Campert
- Simon Carmiggelt
- Jacob Cats
- Isabelle de Charrière
- Antoon Coolen
- Igor Cornelissen
- Willy Corsari
- Louis Couperus
- Rudi van Dantzig
- P.A. Daum
- Aagje Deken
- Maria Dermoût
- Lodewijk van Deyssel (K.J.L. Alberdingk Thijm)
- Adriaan van Dis
- Johnny van Doorn
- Renate Dorrestein
- Bart FM Droog
- Imme Dros
- Frederik van Eeden
- Jan Eekhout
- Justus van Effen
- Margriet Ehlen
- Marcellus Emants
- Jan Fabricius
- Johan Fabricius
- Geesje Feddes
- Louis Fles (Dr. W. Bottema C.Az.)
- Anne Frank

=== G-H ===
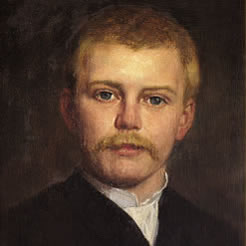
Herman Gorter

- Ida Gerhardt
- Wim Gijsen
- Theo van Gogh
- Herman Gorter
- Hermine de Graaf
- Arnon Grünberg
- Robert van Gulik
- Lale Gül
- Halil Gür
- Jacob Haafner
- Hella Haasse

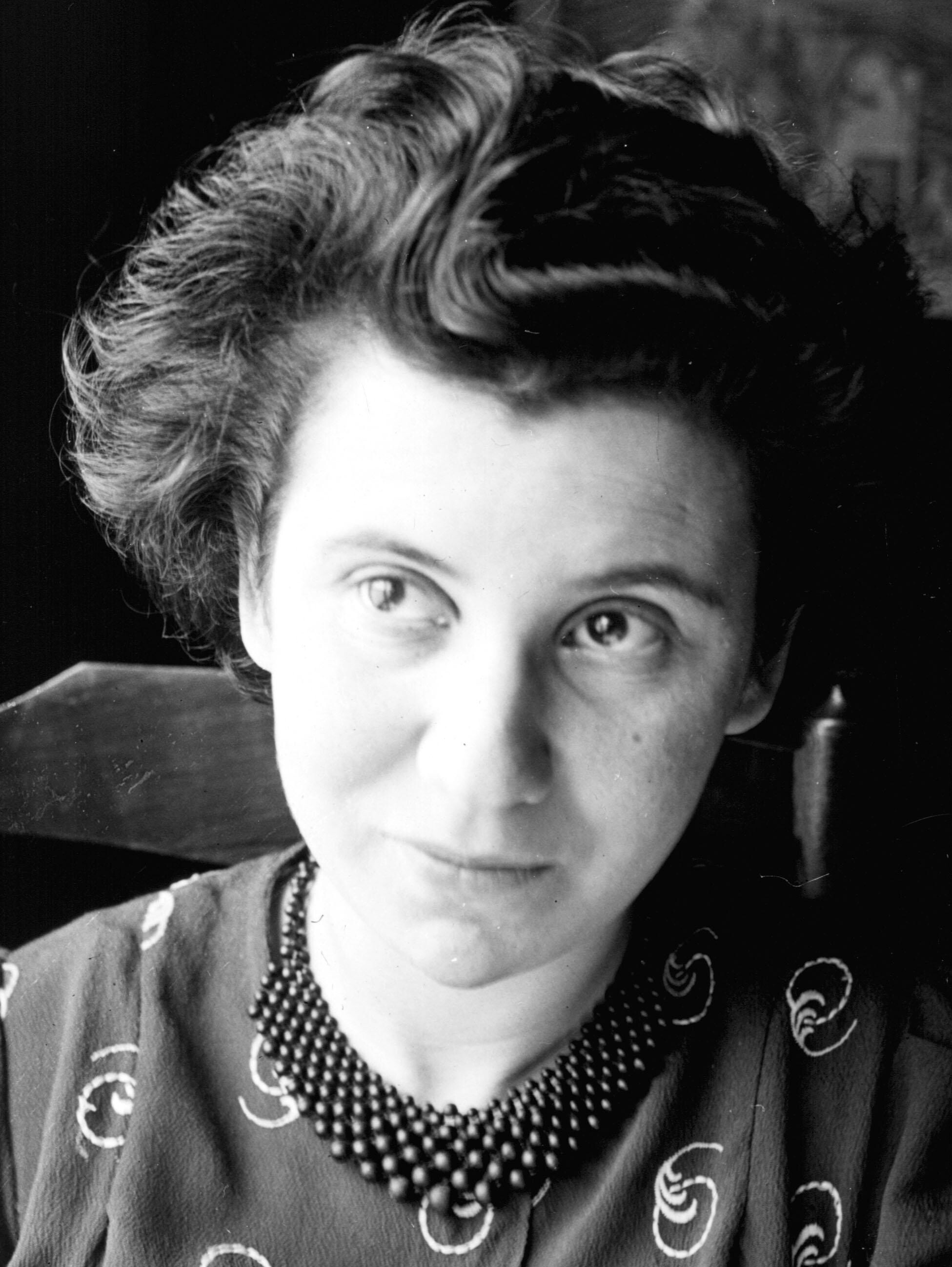
Etty Hillesum

- Hadewych
- Maarten 't Hart
- Jan de Hartog
- Havank
- Simon Heere Heeresma
- Willem Frederik Hermans
- Willy van der Heide (Willem van den Hout)
- A.F.Th. van der Heijden
- Herman Heijermans
- Hildebrand (Nicolaas Beets)
- Etty Hillesum
- Hinrek van Alckmer
- Wim Hofman
- Pieter Corneliszoon Hooft
- Conrad Busken Huet
- Constantijn Huygens

=== I-L ===
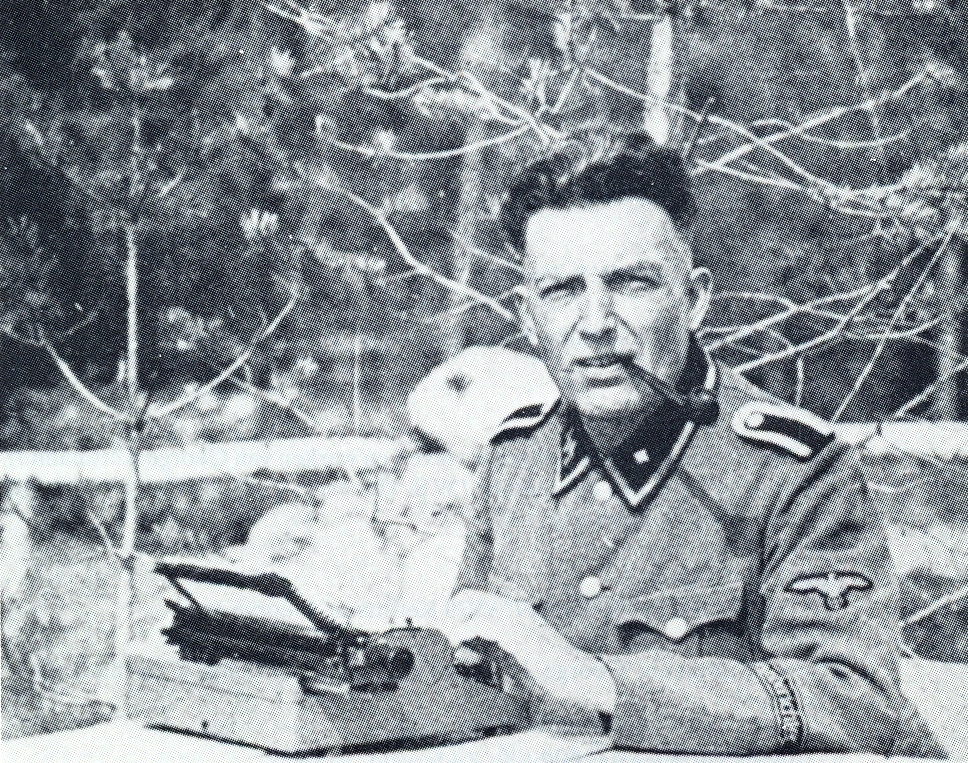
George Kettmann

- Victor Ido
- Arthur Japin
- Jacques de Kadt
- George Kettmann
- Piet J. Kroonenberg
- Richard Klinkhamer
- Willem Kloos
- Gerrit Komrij
- Hans Koning
- Rudy Kousbroek
- Tim Krabbé
- Gerrit Krol
- Eric de Kuyper
- Theo Lalleman
- Jacob van Lennep
- Jacobus van Looy
- Lucebert (L.J.Swaanswijk)

=== M-R ===
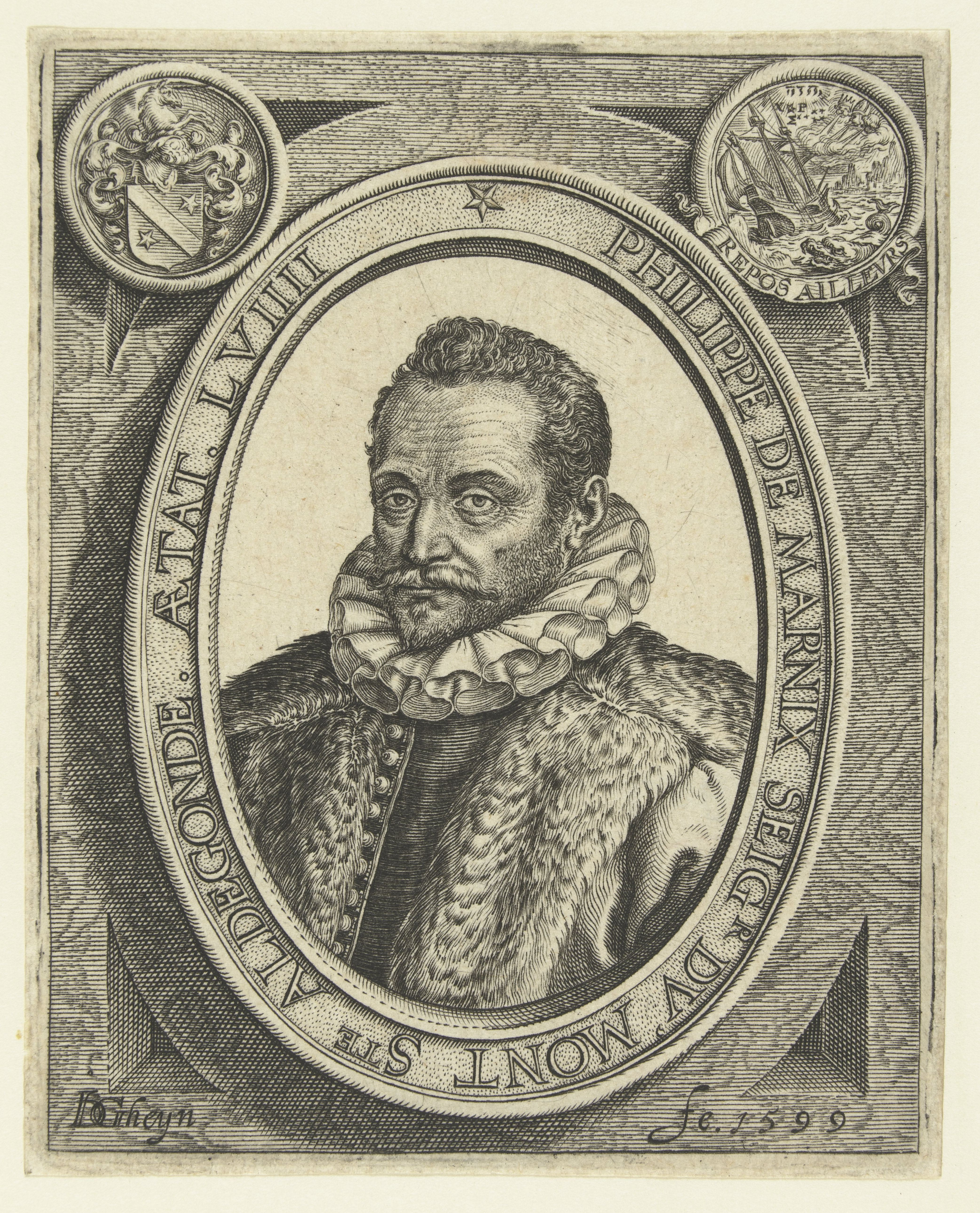
Philips van Marnix van Sint-Aldegonde

- Philips van Marnix van Sint-Aldegonde
- Cissy van Marxveldt
- Ischa Meijer
- Willem de Mérode
- Nicolaas Matsier (Tjit Reinsma)
- Dora van der Meiden-Coolsma
- Marga Minco (Sara Voeten-Minco)
- Jan Mulder
- Harry Mulisch
- Multatuli (Eduard Douwes Dekker)
- Nescio (J.H.F.Grönloh)
- Carel van Nievelt (Gabriël, J. van den Oude)
- Cees Nooteboom
- Henri Nouwen
- Martinus Nijhoff
- Inte Onsman
- Olga Orman
- Piet Paaltjens (François Haverschmidt)

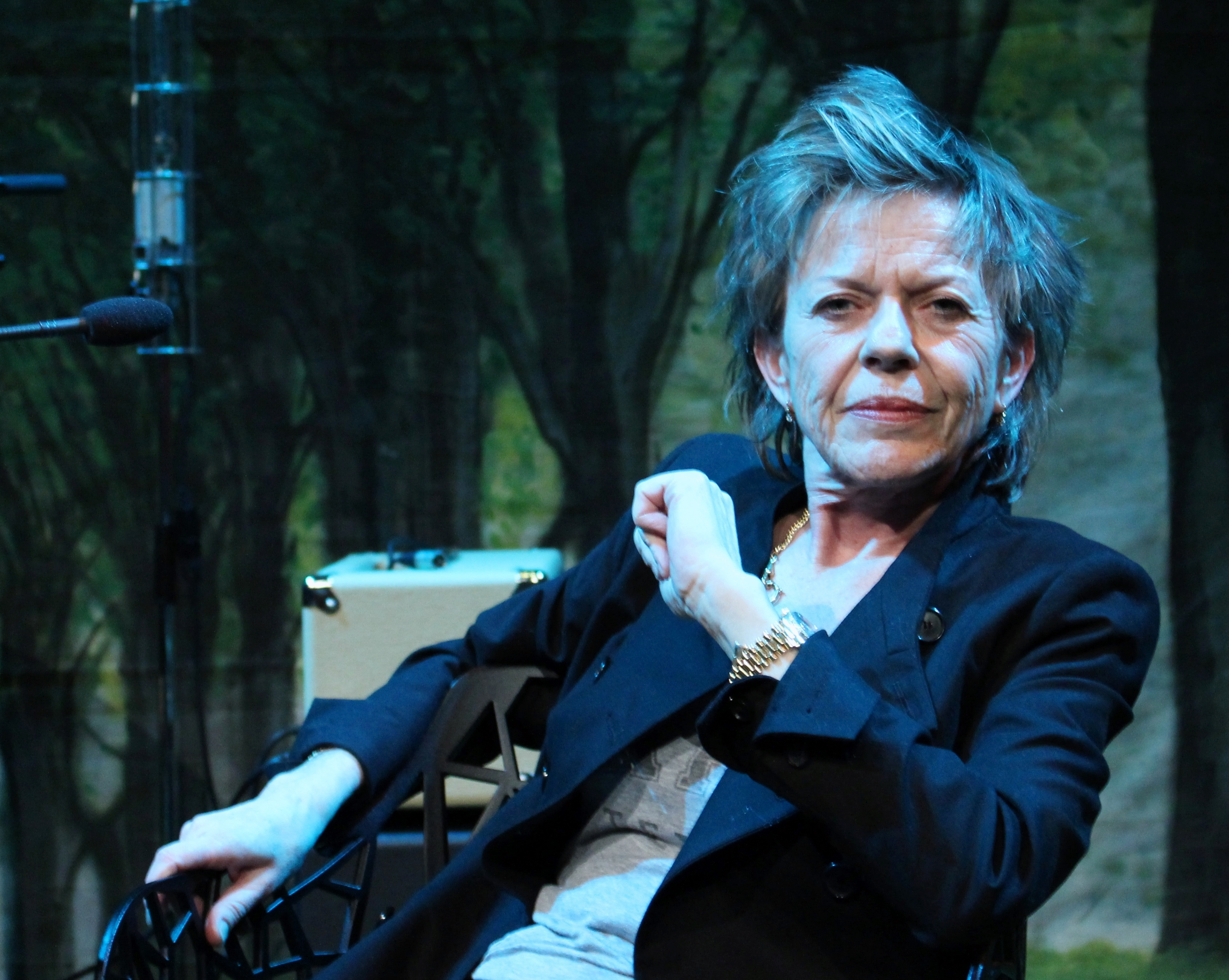
Connie Palmen

- Johannes Hendricus van der Palm
- Connie Palmen
- Edgar du Perron
- Sophia Elizabeth Peeters
- Marianne Philips
- Gerard Reve
- Frank van Ree
- Adriaan Roland Holst
- Tomas Ross
- Maarten van Rossem
- Renate Rubinstein

=== S-Z ===
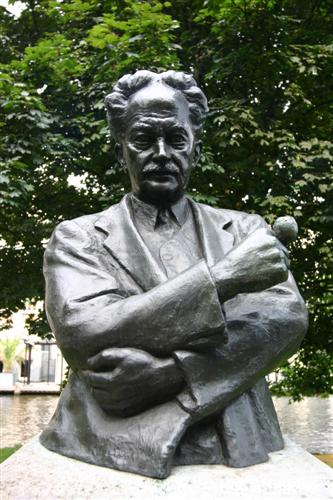
Arthur van Schendel

- Annet Schaap
- Arthur van Schendel
- Bert Schierbeek
- Annie M. G. Schmidt
- Abraham Louis Schneiders
- Anja Sicking
- Arend Fokke Simonsz
- J. Slauerhoff
- Hendrik Laurenszoon Spiegel
- F. Springer
- Hilda van Stockum
- Melis Stoke
- Jan Terlouw
- Felix Thijssen
- Marten Toonder
- Bob den Uyl
- M. Vasalis (Margaretha Drooglever Fortuyn-Leenmans)
- Pauline van de Ven
- Simon Vestdijk
- Stephanie Vetter
- Roemer Visscher
- Joost van den Vondel
- Anne de Vries
- Theun de Vries
- Leo Vroman
- Simon de Waal
- Hans Warren
- Siebren van der Werf
- Henri van Wermeskerken
- Janwillem van de Wetering
- Willem Wilmink
- Leon de Winter
- Justine Constance Wirix-van Mansvelt
- Betje Wolff
- Jan Wolkers
- Yael van der Wouden
- Sadik Yemni
- Marie van Zeggelen
- Joost Zwagerman

== Flemish writers and poets ==
=== A-D ===
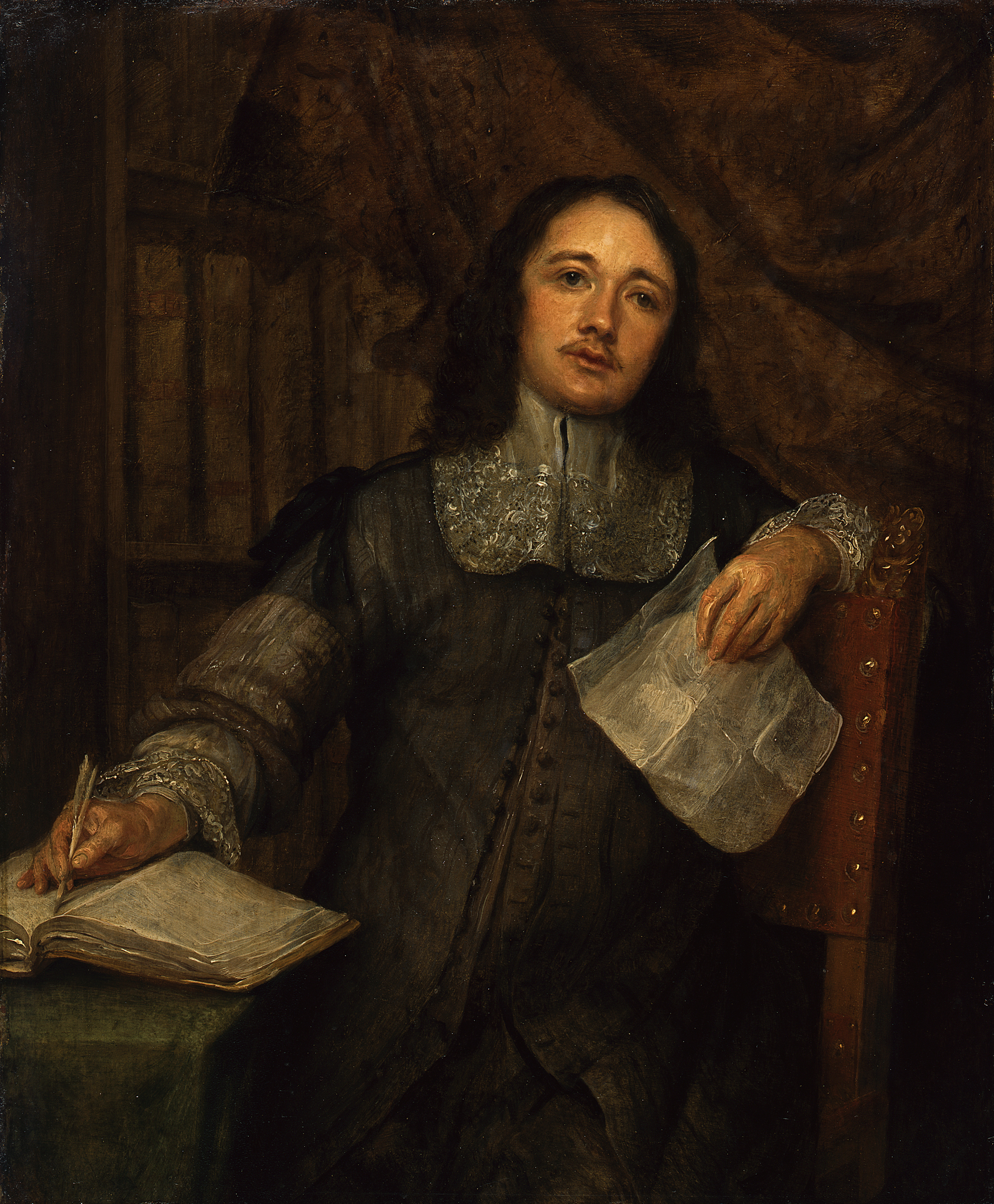
Cornelis de Bie

- Frank Adam
- Roger Avermaete
- Pieter Aspe
- Fernand Auwera (Fernand Van der Auwera)
- Aster Berkhof (Lode Van Den Bergh)
- Louis Paul Boon
- Herman Brusselmans
- Cyriel Buysse
- Ernest Claes
- Paul Claes
- Hugo Claus
- Rosiana Coleners
- Hendrik Conscience
- Johan Daisne (Herman Thiery)
- Cornelis de Bie
- Herman De Coninck
- Rita Demeester
- Roger M.J. De Neef
- Filip De Pillecyn
- Freddy de Vree
- Astère M. Dhondt
- Gaston Durnez

=== E-K ===
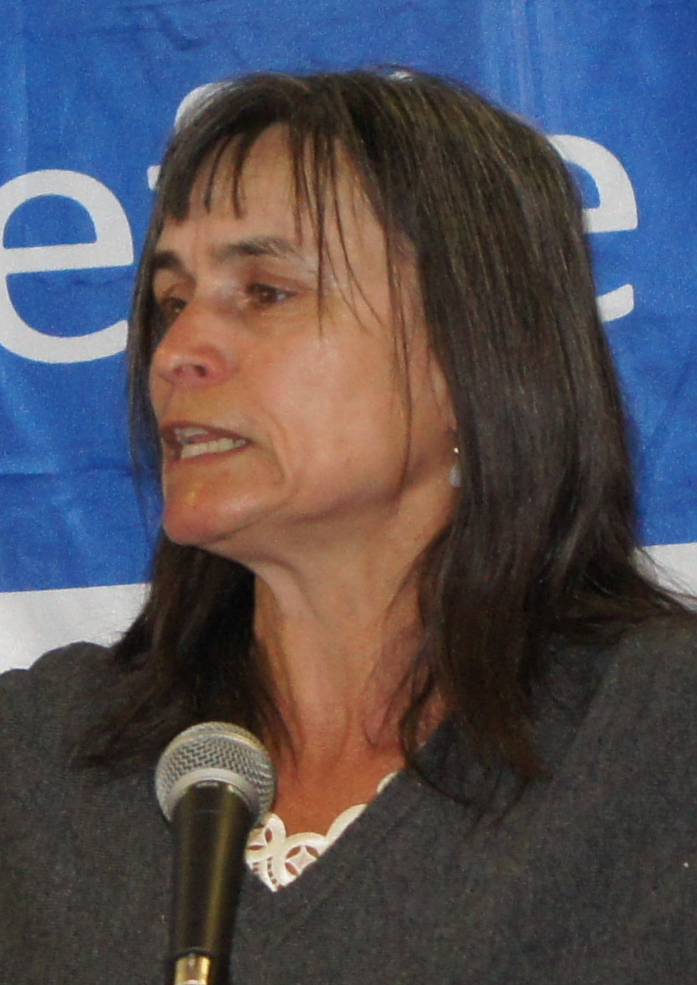
Kristien Hemmerechts

- Willem Elsschot (Alfons de Ridder)
- Jef Geeraerts
- Guido Gezelle
- Marnix Gijsen
- Maurice Gilliams
- Jan Hammenecker
- Georges Hebbelinck
- Kristien Hemmerechts
- Stefan Hertmans
- Emmanuel Hiel
- Guido van Heulendonk
- Jotie T'Hooft
- Eric de Kuyper

=== L-T ===
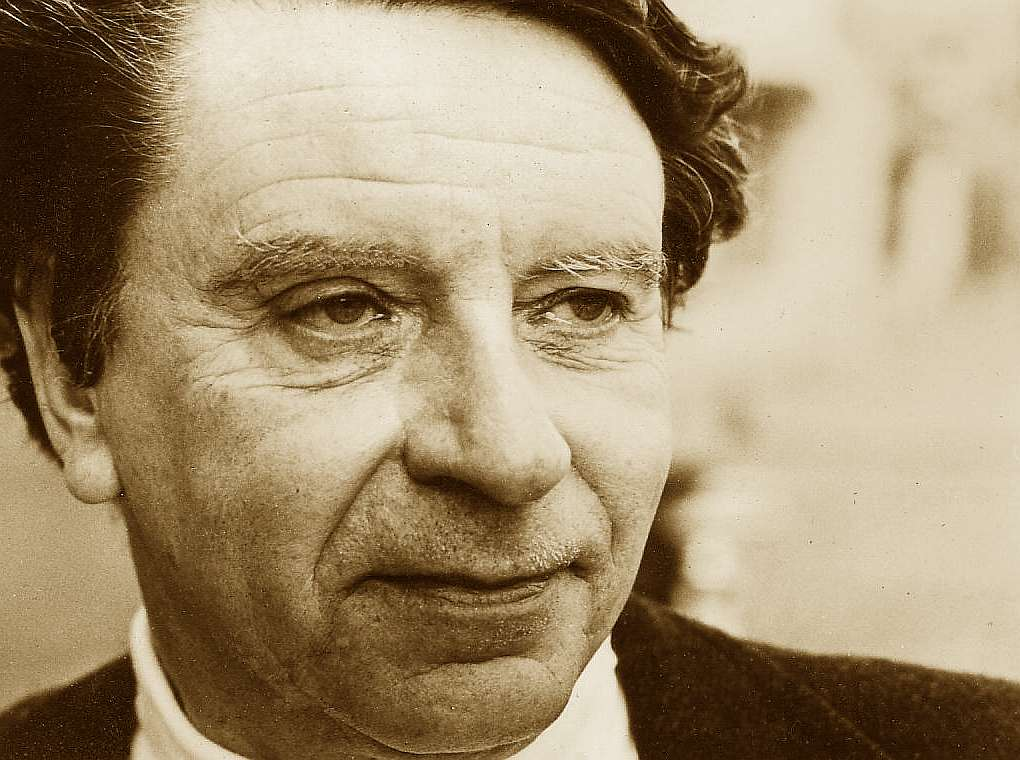
Hubert Lampo (photo Tom Ordelman)

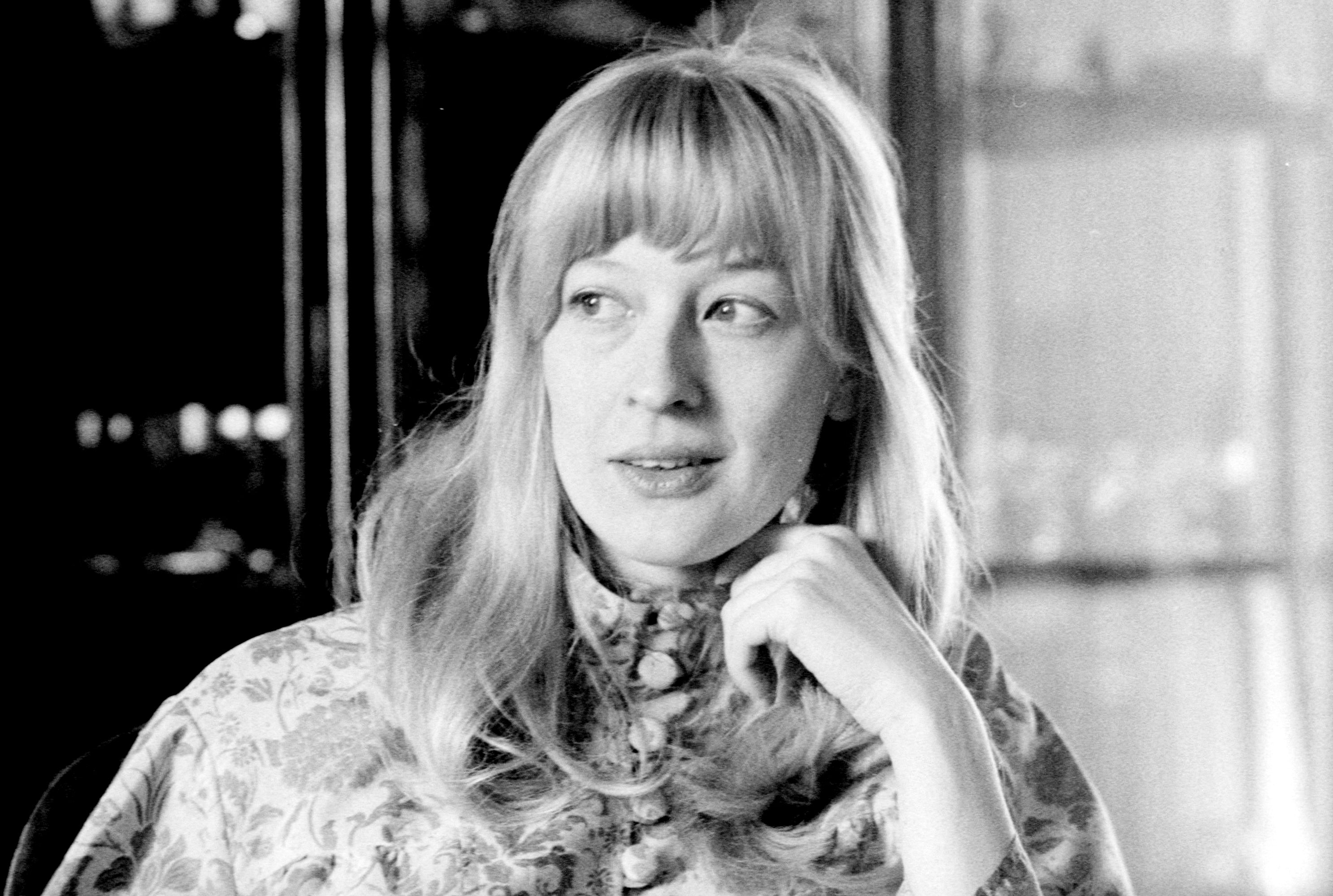
Monika van Paemel

- Hubert Lampo
- Tom Lanoye
- Rosalie Loveling
- Virginie Loveling
- Patricia de Martelaere
- Bob Mendes
- Ivo Michiels
- Wies Moens
- Erwin Mortier
- Jan van Nijlen
- Leonard Nolens
- Joris Note
- Paul van Ostaijen
- Monika van Paemel
- Ivo Pauwels
- Leo Pleysier
- Anne Provoost
- Hugo Raes
- Daniel Robberechts
- Albrecht Rodenbach
- Willy Roggeman
- Maria Rosseels
- Ward Ruyslinck (Raymond Charles Marie de Belser)
- Clem Schouwenaars
- Paul Snoek
- Lucienne Stassaert
- Stijn Streuvels
- Herman Teirlinck
- Felix Timmermans

=== U-Z ===
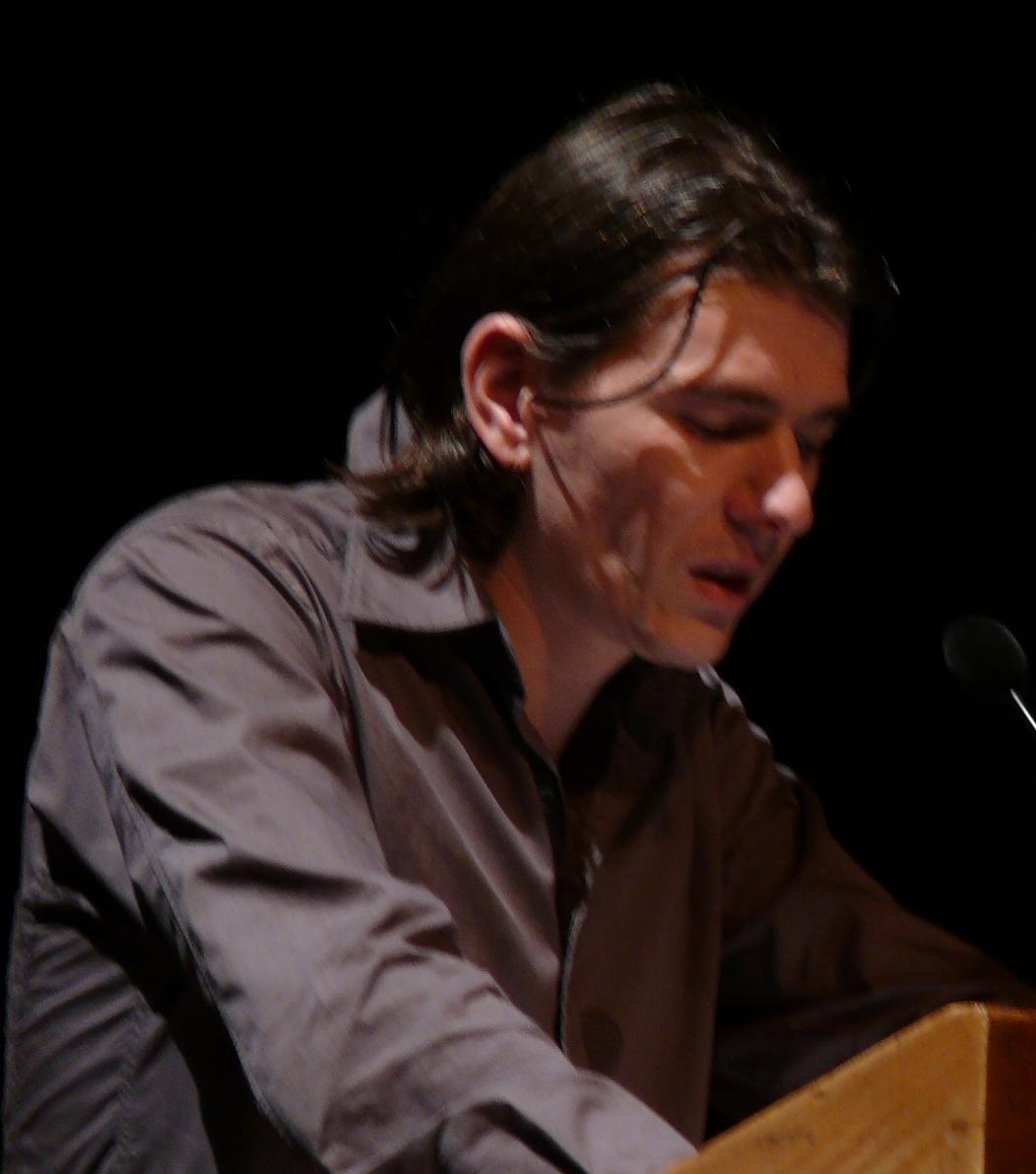
Dimitri Verhulst

- Jos Vandeloo
- Walter van den Broeck
- Roger van de Velde
- Karel van de Woestijne
- Geert van Istendael
- Karel van Mander
- Eddy Van Vliet
- Hendrik van Veldeke
- Paul Verhaeghen
- Peter Verhelst
- Dimitri Verhulst
- Eriek Verpale
- Cornelis Columbanus Vrancx
- Carla Walschap
- Gerard Walschap
- Paul De Wispelaere
- Lode Zielens
- Maria van Zuylekom

== Surinamese writers and poets ==
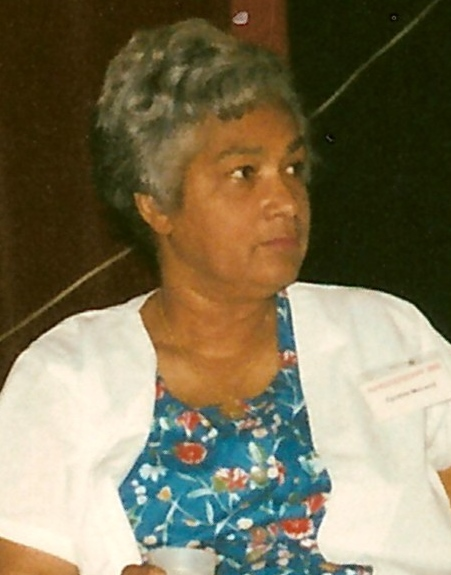
Cynthia McLeod

- Albert Helman
- Anton de Kom
- Cynthia McLeod
- Anil Ramdas
- Trefossa (Henri Frans de Ziel)
- Bea Vianen

== Antillian writers and poets ==
- Tip Marugg
- Frank Martinus Arion

== See also ==
- List of Dutch women writers
- List of Belgian women writers
- Canon of Dutch Literature
