= Peter de Zwaan =

Dutch writer (born 1944)

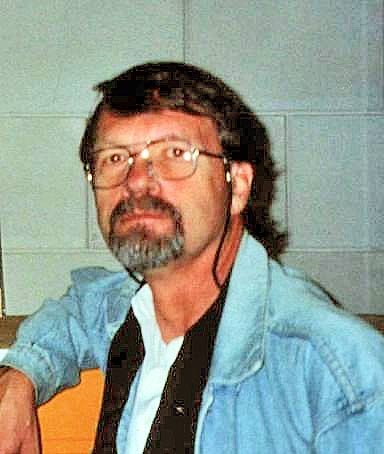
- Born: August 17, 1944 (age 80); Meppel, Netherlands
- Genre: Thriller

Peter de Zwaan (Meppel, 17 August 1944) is a Dutch writer of thrillers for young readers; he is best known as the second writer of the Bob Evers series, which he took over after the death of Willem van den Hout.
