= Muska (disambiguation) =

Marija "Muska" Babitzin (born 1952) is a Finnish singer.

Muska may also refer to:

== People ==
- Muska, a name appearing in Assyrian inscriptions identified as Meshech, one of the sons of Japheth, son of Noah
- Chad Muska (born 1977), American professional skateboarder

== Places ==
- Muska, the Hungarian name for Muşca village, Lupșa Commune, Alba County, Romania

== Film and literature ==
- Muska ("The Amulet"), a 1996 Turkish novel by author Sadık Yemni
- Muska (film), a 2014 Turkish film featuring Meriç Aral

== Other ==
- A Kilim motif amulet
