= Louis Lens =

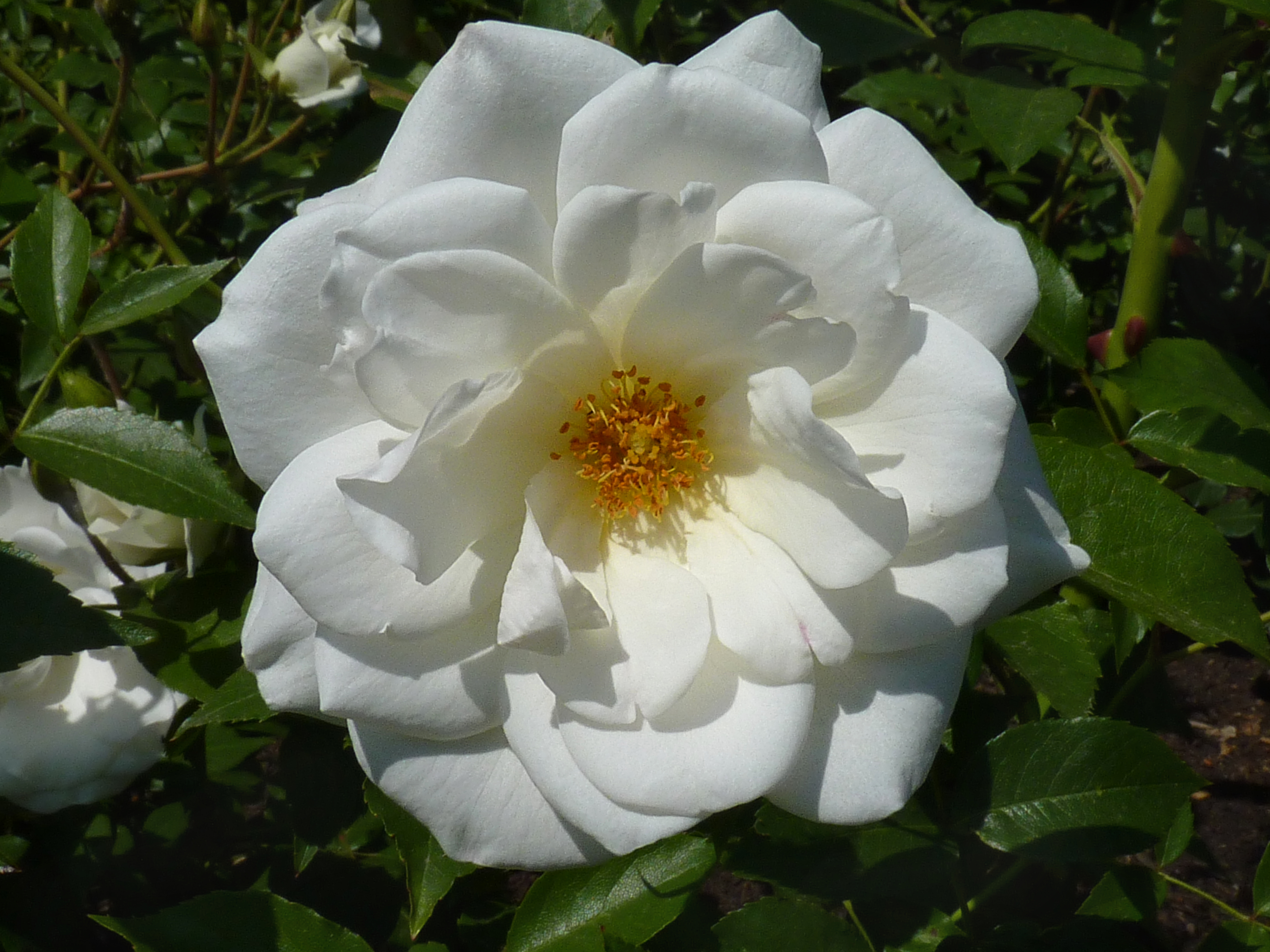
'Maria Mathilda', 1980

Louis Lens, son of rose-breeder Victor Lens, (3 March 1924 - 10 May 2001), was a rose breeder in the Benelux countries.

The roses introduced by him and his still active nursery, NV Louis Lens, at Oudenburg near Bruges, Belgium (still adding about two varieties a year), outnumber David Austin's 190, and though never nearly as successful abroad, they grow an excellent quality (e.g. his multiple-prize winning white Hybrid Tea 'Pascali' from 1956 was even voted in the World Top 10), especially in the fairly rare Hybrid Musk group (like 'Guirlande d'Amour' and 'Plaisanterie').

The biography of Lens, his obtentions, and his challenges, particularly the obtention of Hybrid Musk Roses, are described in detail in Ivo Pauwels's book Louis Lens - De elegantie en de roos.
