= Ivo Pauwels =

Belgian writer

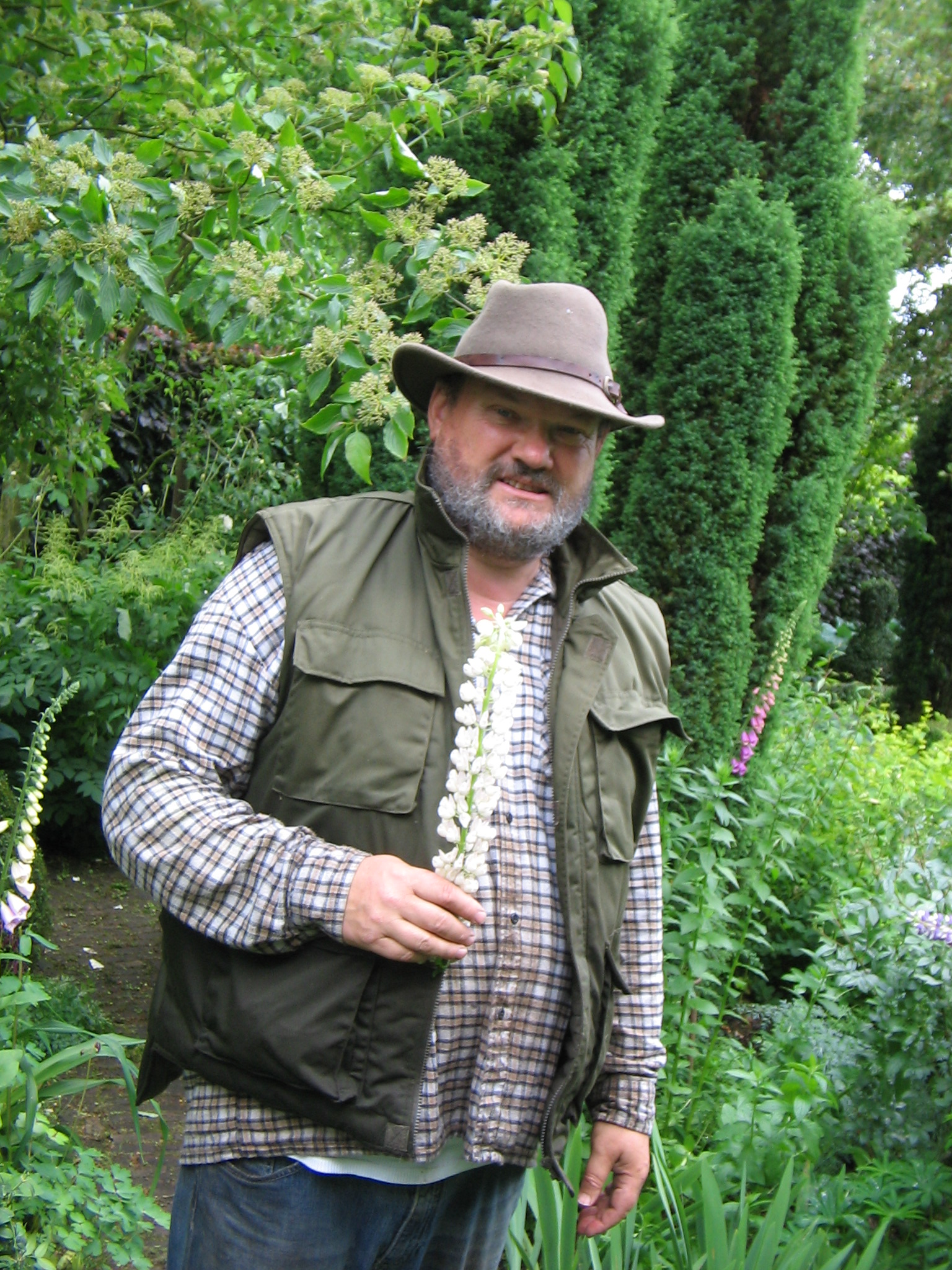
- Ivo Pauwels in his garden
- Born: Yvo Jozef Kristiaan Maria Corneel Pauwels; November 21, 1950 (age 75); Wilrijk, Belgium
- Writing career
- Language: Dutch
- Notable work: Louis Lens - De elegantie en de roos

Ivo Pauwels (born 1950) is a Flemish author.

== Biography ==
For 20 years, Pauwels was a teacher and began to write articles and columns about gardening in newspapers and magazines. His career as a writer grew significantly, and since 1995 he has written over 60 books on various topics including gardening, antiques, quilts, plants, fines herbes, colours, composting, diabetes mellitus (an illness from which he suffers), barbecue safety, wooden annexes, and greenhouses, as well as biographies of artists and architects. He has also contributed photographs to several of his own books and the books of other authors. Several of his books have been translated into English, French, German, Japanese and Afrikaans. He also has contributed to poetry and erotica anthologies.

For 15 years Pauwels was chief editor of the magazines Bloemen & Planten and De Tuinen van Eden/Les Jardins d’Eden, and for 10 years a writer and editor for the television programme Groene Vingers on VTM, in which he also sometimes appeared as expert. His garden in Zoersel is open to the public on selected days in May and June.

Pauwels is the gardening advisor of Radio 2. He participates in live broadcasts, during which he answers questions from audience members. He has conducted many lectures, mainly on roses, in several European countries, Thailand, Indonesia, and New Zealand. He finds topics for his books and lectures during his numerous journeys and botanical expeditions.

In 2006, he received in Osaka the World Federation of Rose Societies Literary Award for his book, Louis Lens – De elegantie en de roos, and in the same year the Beervelde Award for the photography of the book Rozenraad.

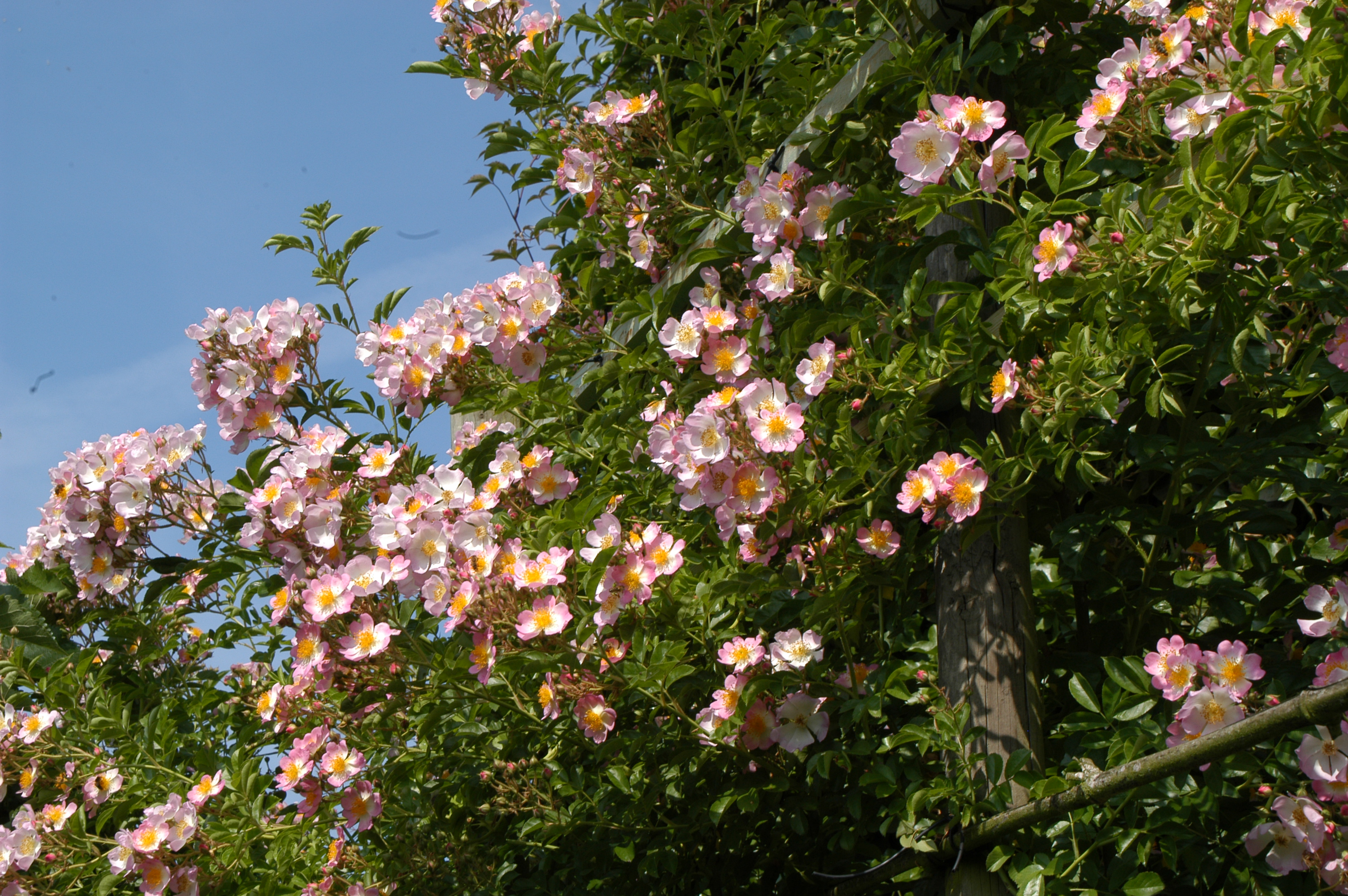
Rosa 'Ella Elisabeth', a rose cultivar that originated in Pauwels's garden

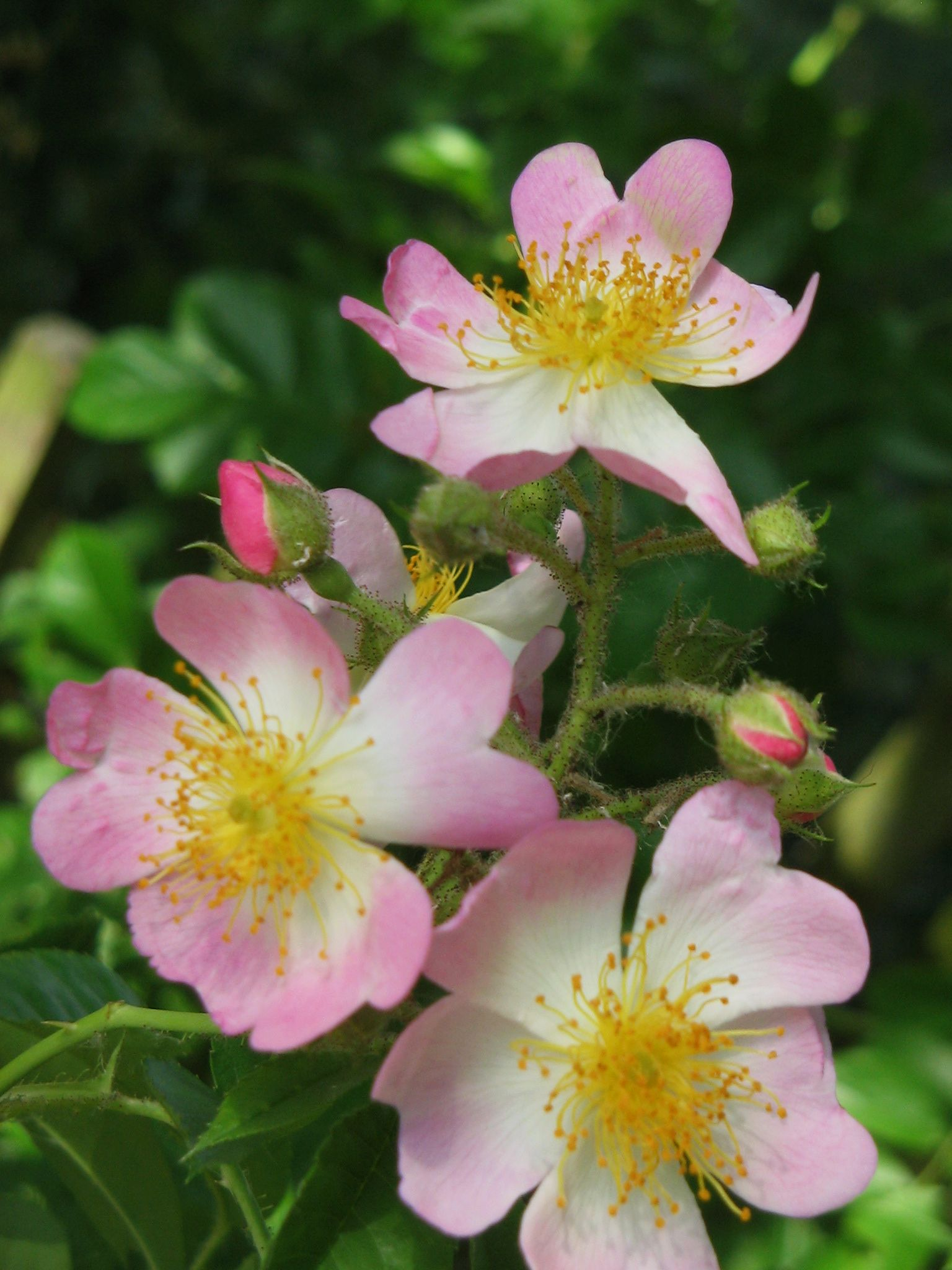
Rosa 'Ella Elisabeth' (detail)

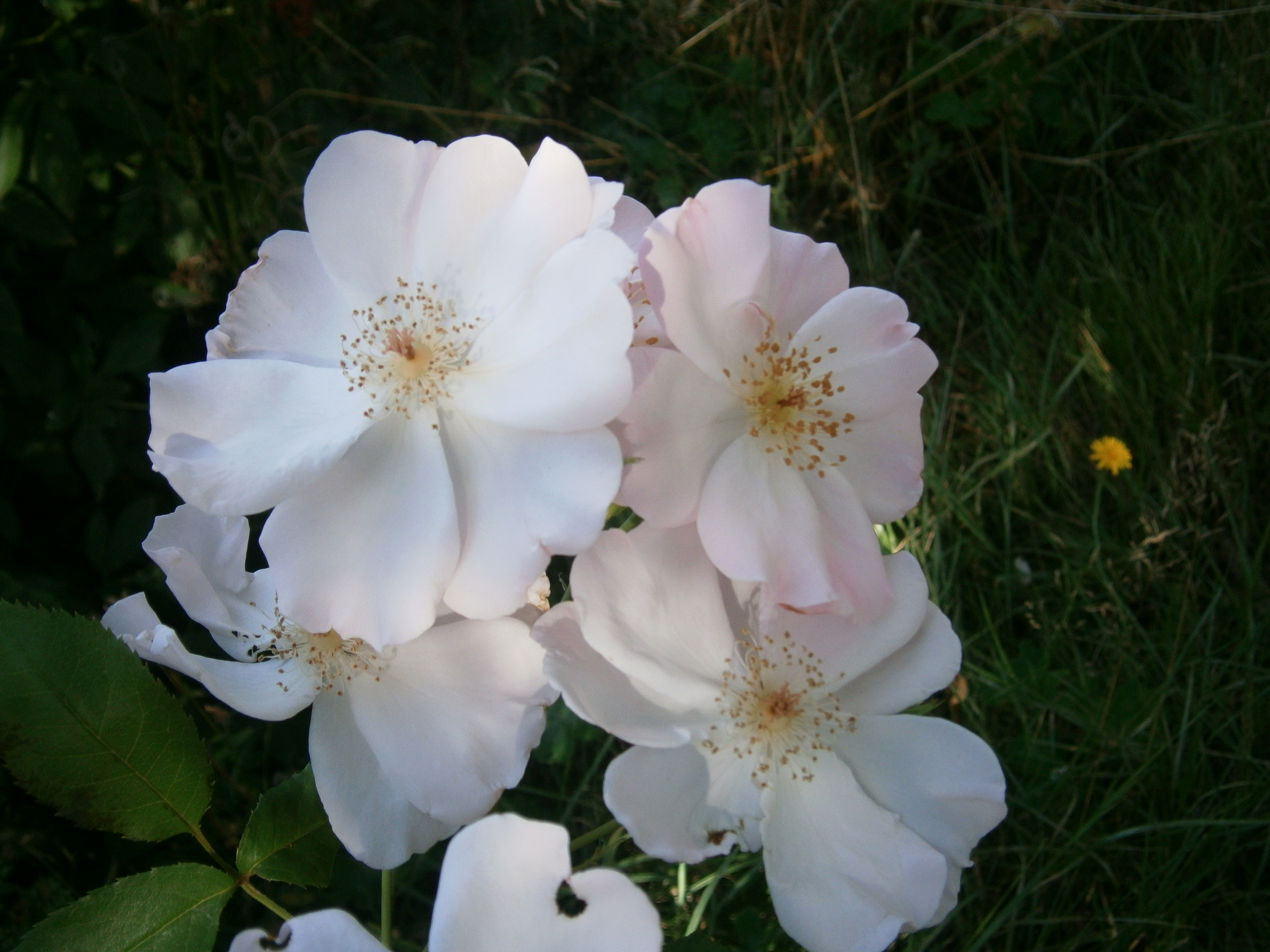
Rosa 'Lieve Louise', a rose that Louis Lens named after Pauwels's wife

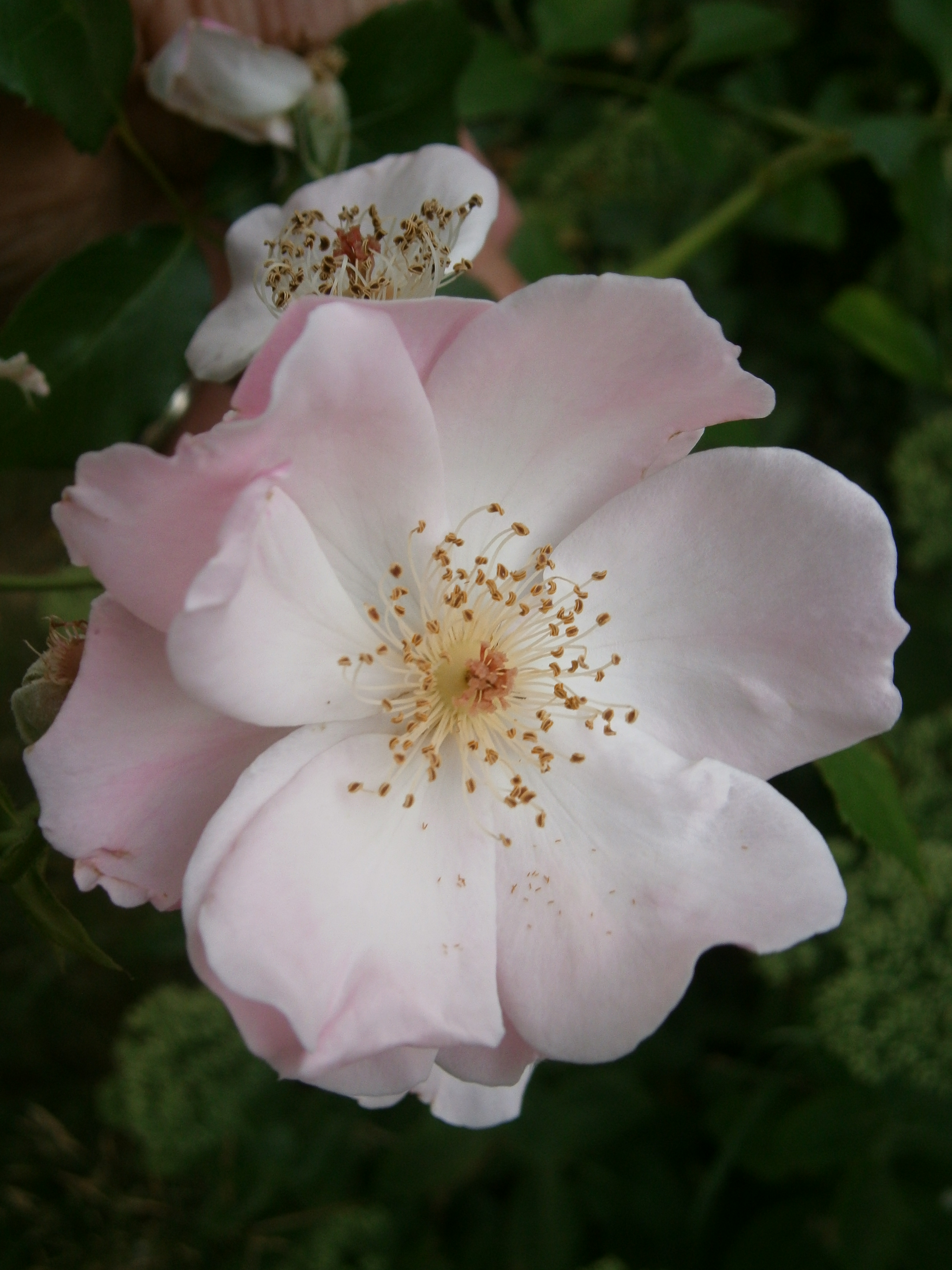
Rosa 'Lieve Louise' close-up

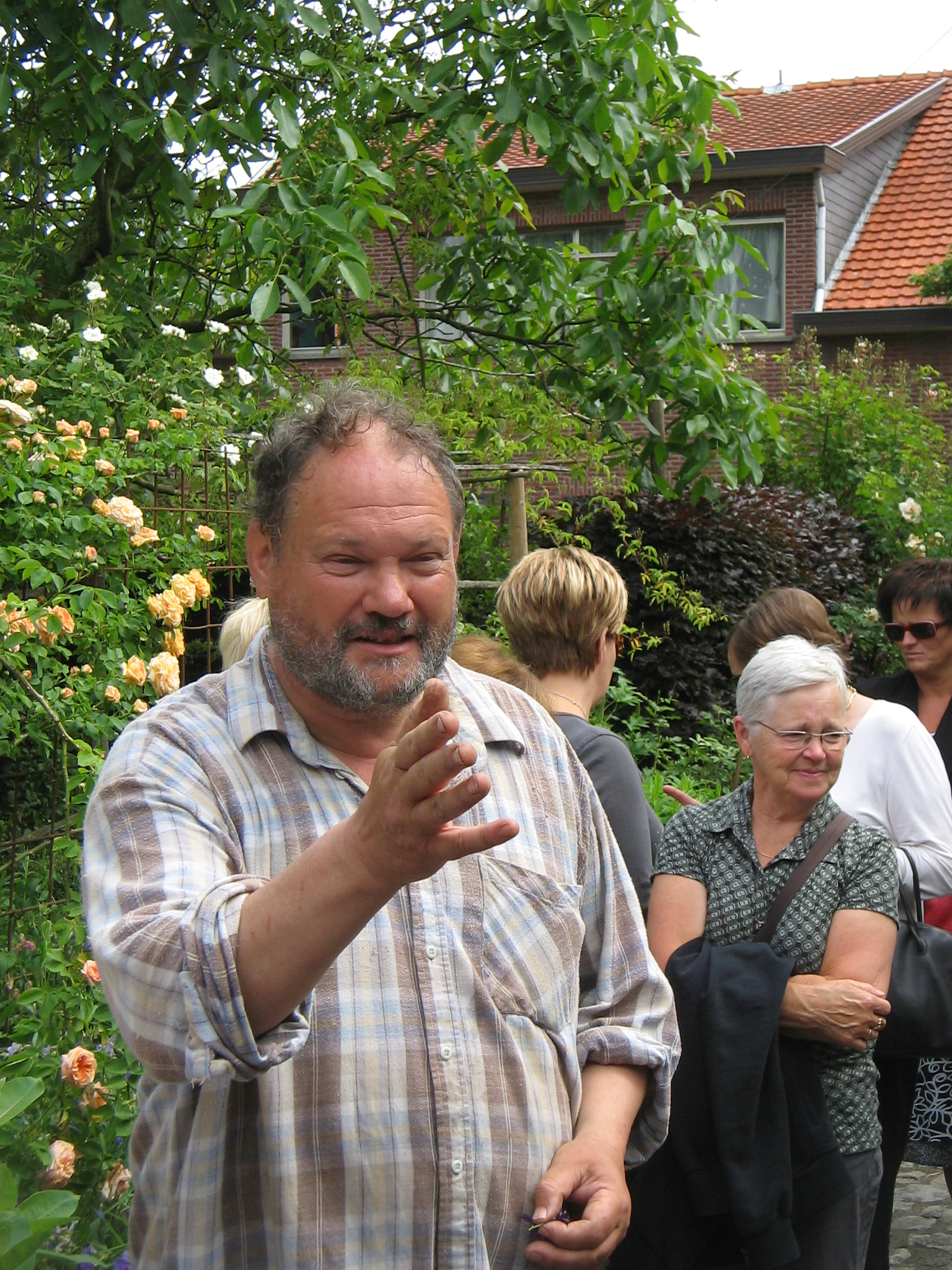
Pauwels during an open house

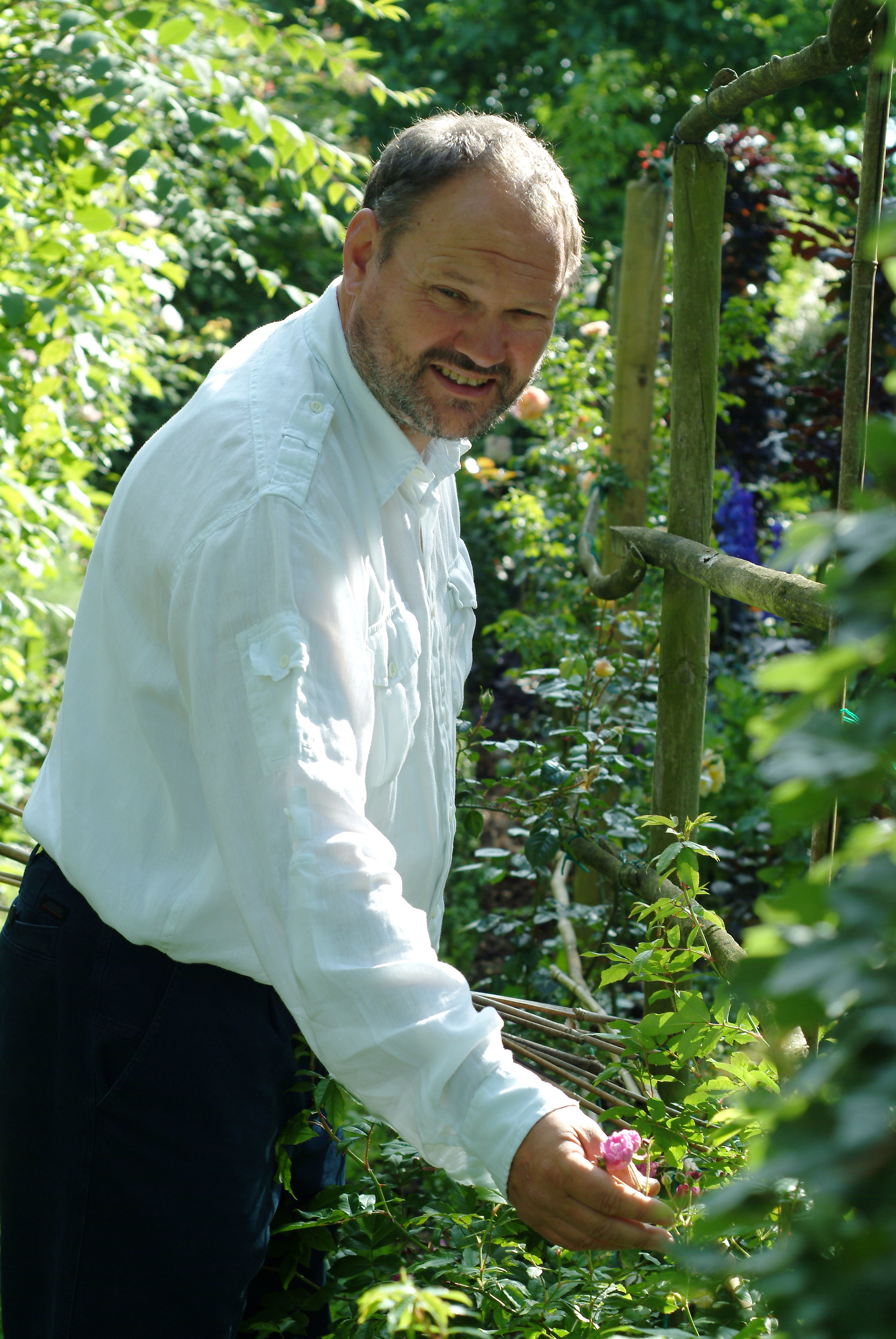
Pauwels during a reportage
