= Bob Evers =

Dutch novel series by Willem van den Hout

Bob Evers is a Dutch novel series of boys' books, named for the main character, written by Dutch author and Nazi collaborator Willem van den Hout, under the pseudonym Willy van der Heide. The series was started in 1949; 32 volumes were published until 1963. Van den Hout published two additional volumes in 1977, and the series was extended by Peter de Zwaan, who published volume 50 in 2010. An estimated five million Bob Evers books were sold.

== History ==
The origin of the Bob Evers series was a feuilleton in a 1943 issue of the Nazi magazine Jeugd ("Youth"), "De avonturen van 3 jongens in de Stille Zuidzee" ("The adventures of three boys in the Pacific")—at the time, van den Hout published for a number of magazines associated with Fascist parties, including the NSB. After the war, when his credentials as a journalist were revoked, he revived the idea, renaming his protagonist Bob Evers (he had been called Rob Evers in 1943).

Van den Hout was under contract with M. Stenvert and Son, a publishing company from Meppel. He wrote 32 books for the series (volume 33 was never finished). He sold the rights to Stenvert in 1967 for 100,000 guilders, and later tried to get them back, unsuccessfully. He wrote two more volumes in breach of contract, after which the series was continued by Peter de Zwaan.

== Characters ==
- Arie Roos – A chubby redhead, profligate with money and with a gift for gab; he is able to talk himself out of any trouble. Like Jan Prins, he is a student at the Hogere Burgerschool. Son of Shipping magnate Roos (of 'Rederij Roos')
- Jan Prins – Skinny and frugal, he plays the straight man to Arie Roos. Son of Colonel Prins late of the Dutch army in the Dutch East-Indies
- Bob Evers – Formerly Rob Evers, the son of a machine engineering magnate from Pittsburg, he became Bob Evers, an American boy and friend of Arie and Jan.

== Adaptations ==
The novels were also adapted into a series of comic books, with Frans Jonker as scriptwriter and Hans van Oudenaarden as artist.

== Books ==
The following is a chronological list of all published novels in the Bob Evers series. The years indicate the first publication of each title.

1. Een overval in de lucht (1949; republished as volume 4 from 1965)

2. De jacht op het koperen kanon (1950; republished as volume 5 from 1965)

3. Sensatie op een Engelse vrachtboot (1950; republished as volume 6 from 1965)

4. Avonturen in de Stille Zuidzee (1950; republished as volume 1 from 1965)

5. Drie jongens op een onbewoond eiland (1950; republished as volume 2 from 1965)

6. De strijd om het goudschip (1951; republished as volume 3 from 1965)

7. Tumult in een toeristenhotel (1951)

8. Drie jongens als circusdetective (1952)

9. Een dollarjacht in een D-trein (1952)

10. Een speurtocht door Noord-Afrika (1953)

11. Drie jongens en een caravan (1953)

12. Kabaal om een varkensleren koffer (1953)

13. Een motorboot voor een drijvend flesje (1953)

14. Een klopjacht op een Kapitein (1954)

15. Een raderboot als zilvervloot (1954)

16. Nummer negen seint New-York (1954)

17. Een meesterstunt in Mexico (1955)

18. Trammelant op Trinidad (1955)

19. Vreemd krakeel in Californië (1955)

20. Lotgevallen rond een locomotief (1955)

21. Pyjama-rel in Panama (1956)

22. Vreemd gespuis in een warenhuis (1957)

23. Wilde sport om een nummerbord (1957)

24. Hoog spel in Hongkong (1958)

25. Een vliegtuigsmokkel met verrassingen (1958)

26. Stampij om een schuiftrompet (1959)

27. Kunstgrepen met kunstschatten (1959)

28. Bombarie om een bunker (1960)

29. Ali Roos als Arie Baba (1960)

30. Heibel in Honoloeloe (1961)

31. Arie Roos wordt geheim agent (1961)

32. Cnall-effecten in Casablanca (1963)

33. Bob Evers belegert Fort B (1977; republished in a revised edition by Peter de Zwaan in 1988)

34. Arie Roos als ruilmatroos (1977; republished in a revised edition by Peter de Zwaan in 1988)

35. Een zeegevecht met watervrees (1987; completed by Peter de Zwaan)

36. Kloppartijen in een koelhuis (1989; completed by Peter de Zwaan)

37. Superslag in een supermarkt (1990; from this volume onward, the series was continued by Peter de Zwaan)

38. Een festival vol verwikkelingen (1991)

39. Bouwbonje om een staalskelet (1992)

40. Schermutselingen bij een zandafgraving (1993)

41. Bakkeleien in een Berlijnse bios (1994)

42. De stripman van Slubice (1995)

43. Bizarre klussen met vakantiebussen (1996)

44. Raadselrellen rond een rondreis (1997)

45. Listige loeren in Las Vegas (1998)

46. Feestelijke veldslagen in San Antonio (1999)

47. Arie Roos als reserve-acteur (2000)

48. Grof geschut op Schateiland (2001)

49. Maxibotsing op een minibaan (2002)

50. Rumoer in een rustgebied (2003)

51. Clandestiene streken op een cruiseschip (2010)

52. Prijsschieten op een premiejager (2013)

53. Glorierijke missers in La Gloria (2014)

54. Dollemansrit met een Mighty Mite (2015)

55. De perikelen van kolonel Prins (2015)

56. Spektakelspel van Fons de Schilder (2016)

57. Smokkelspoor van meneer Maik (2016)

58. De magistrale misverstanden van J. Masters (2017)

59. Ratzelraadsels bij het château de Faux (2017)

60. Schatgraven in een stationshal (2018)

61. Het preppaleis van de holenman (2018)

62. De gouden greep van tante Ginny (2019)

63. Deining rond een drafbaan (2019)

64. Bliksemacties bij de Buurserbeek (2020)

65. Een opdracht van inspecteur Onge (2020)

66. Valstrikken in en om een Veluwse villa (2021)

67. De Laarzenvrouw van Lerwick. Het Groot Bob Evers Blunder en Blooper Boek (2021)

68. Koude kunstjes in Sausalito (2022)

69. Costaklussen in Marbella (2022)

70. Met gestolen geld naar Gibraltar (2023)

71. Een postpakket voor Porto (2023)

72. Fietspompen voor een fortuin (2023)

73. Geduvel rond een duffel (2024)

74. De Bokbende van Blokzijl (2024)

75. De worstelaar van Wanneperveen (2024)

76. Driftbuien in Driewegsluis (2025)

77. Met zakgeld naar Zanzibar (2025)

78. Belegering bij Bourtange (2025)

79. De vesting van Finsterwolde (2025)

80. Gerommel in een roestig scheepswrak (2026)
