= Bart FM Droog =

Dutch poet (born 1966)

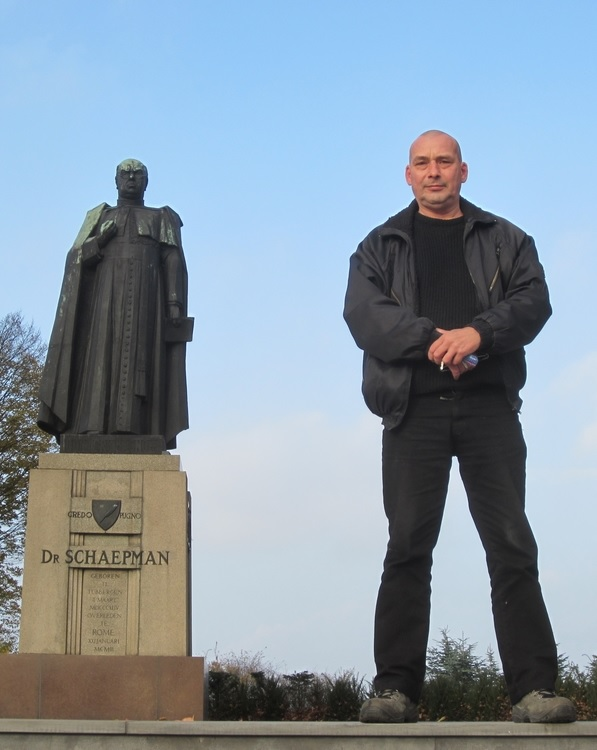
Bart FM Droog in November 2012, near the statue of Herman Schaepman in Tubbergen

Bartelomeus Frederik Maria (Bart FM) Droog (born 18 February 1966, Emmen) is a Dutch poet, anthologist and researcher.

As a poet, Droog performed on stages inside and outside the Netherlands, notably with De Dichters uit Epibreren, a group consisting of the poets Droog and Tjitse Hofman and the musician Jan Klug, which he co-founded. De Dichters uit Epibreren existed from 1994 to 2011; in 2003 they were awarded the Johnny van Doorn Prize for Spoken Literature. Droog took stage in Iran, Armenia, South Africa and many European countries.

In 2002, the city council of Groningen appointed Droog as the first stadsdichter (city poet), for a three year period. In that period he developed the concept of 'De eenzame uitvaart' (The Lonely Funeral): the city poet writes a poem for the deceased without relatives and reads the poem at the funeral. Poets in other cities in the Netherlands and Flanders adopted this idea. Droog was, from 2008 to 2010, also the city poet of his town of birth.

He established the Stichting Nederlandse Poëzie Encyclopedie (Foundation Dutch Poetry Encyclopedia), of which the main goals are to spread Dutch poetry and the knowledge of Dutch language poetry, including through the online Poetry Encyclopedia, the Nederlandse Poëzie Encyclopedie.

From 2013 onwards, Droog also works as an investigative journalist. Subjects he has published about include:

- An unsolved murder case in Groningen's squatters scene in 1990
- Forged poems by Adolf Hitler
- The probably wrong attribution of a painting to Adolf Hitler by the Dutch Institute for War, Holocaust and Genocide Studies (NIOD), a study that was widely cited internationally
- Hendrik de Jong ('the Dutch Jack the Ripper')
- The controversy surrounding the awarding Ad van Liempt the degree of doctor of philosophy (Ph.D.) at the State University of Groningen (Rijksuniversiteit te Groningen) in May 2019, disputing the integrity of the author, which Droog lost.

== Bibliography ==
- Deze dagen, 1998 (debut)
- Benzine, 2000
- In memoriam prins Claus, 2002
- Radioactief, 2004
- Cahier L, 2005
- Veldheer en andere liefdesgedichten, 2009
- Eenzame uitvaart, 2013
- Zeewaarts, 2013
- Novgorod, 2014
- Moordballaden, 2017 (anthology)

== Notes and references ==
- Rottend Staal Online
- Nederlandse Poëzie Encyclopedie
- Droog, periodiek voor slow journalism
