= Anja Sicking =

Dutch writer (born 1965)

Anja Sicking (born 1965, The Hague) is a Dutch writer of novels and short stories.

== Biography ==
Anja Sicking studied the clarinet at the Royal Conservatory for music and dance in The Hague. She went on tour several times with the street symphony orchestra the Ricciotti Ensemble with which she played on the Red Square and in a Russian prison. She also played in numerous chamber music ensembles, for instance in the Ebonykwartet and the Ensemble Contraint.

As time went by, she also started writing short stories. Winning a literature award encouraged her to continue, as did the invitation to write radio stories for a Dutch art and culture program. As writing and making music became difficult to combine, she chose literature.

Her first novel, The Keurisquartet (a quartet named after the modern Dutch composer Tristan Keuris), was awarded the Dutch Marten Toonder/Geertjan Lubberhuizen Prize for best debut in 2000. Her second novel, The Silent Sin, was nominated for the DIF/BNG-prize and the International Dublin Literary Award 2008. It was translated into German (SchirmerGraf Verlag), English (Marion Boyars Publishers), and Turkish (Anemon).

== Bibliography ==
- The Keurisquartet (2000)
- De stomme zonde (The Silent Sin) (2005)
- De tien wetten der verleiding (The Ten Laws of Seduction) (2009)
