= Geesje Feddes =

Dutch feminist and writer (1831–1882)

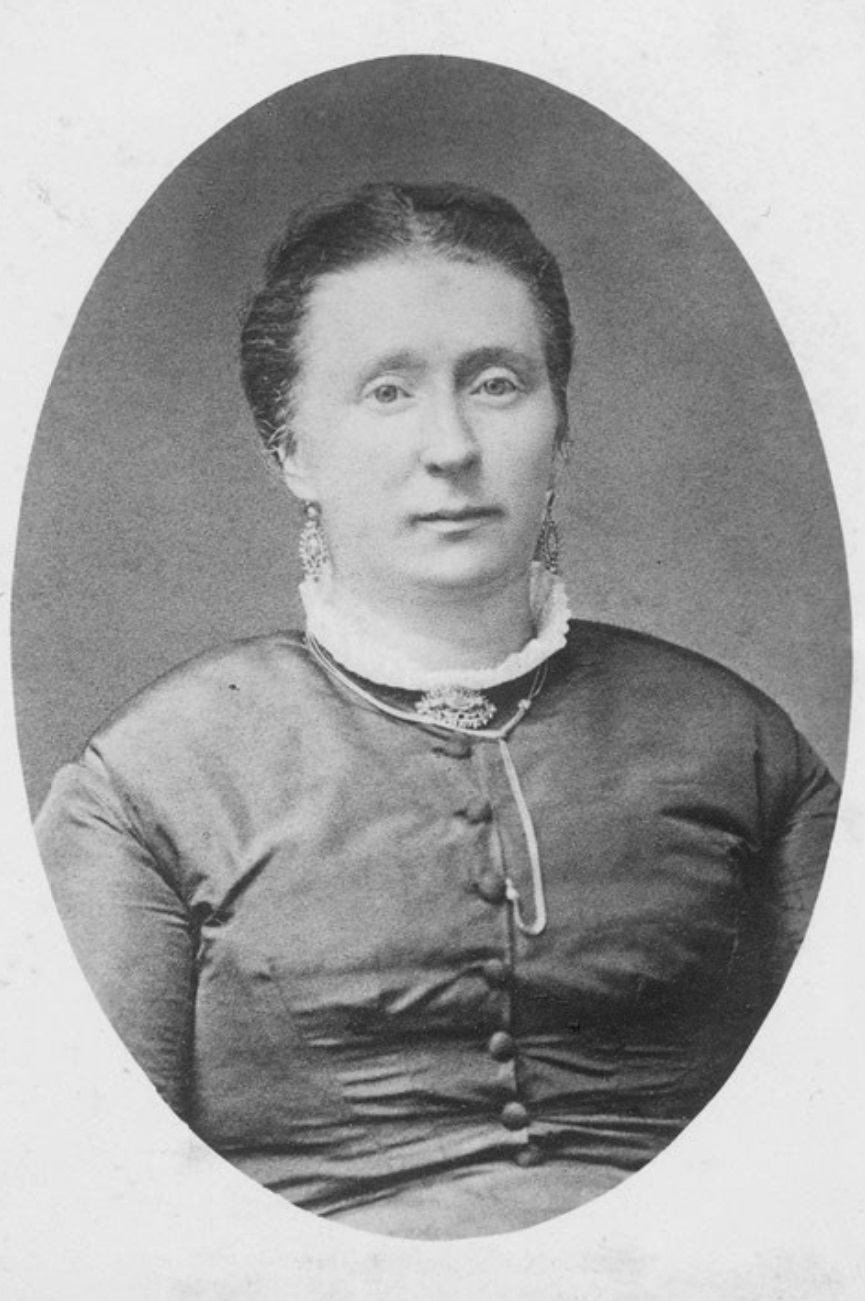
- Born: 22 December 1831; Leeuwarden, Netherlands
- Died: 24 September 1882 (aged 50); Leeuwarden, Netherlands
- Occupations: Feminist and writer
- Children: 12

Geesje Beekhuis (née Feddes, 22 December 1831 – 24 September 1882) was a Dutch feminist and writer.

== Family ==
Feddes was born on 22 December 1831 in Leeuwarden. Her father was a merchant who traded in livestock and real estate and her mother came from a family of goldsmiths. She married Christiaan Houdijn Beekhuis, who worked as a notary, on 15 February 1855 in Leeuwarden. She moved to live with her husband in Buitenpost and they had twelve children.

== Career ==
In 1870, Feddes published the pamphlet Equal Rights for All! (Dutch: Gelijk recht voor allen!). The 36 page pamphlet was published under a pseudonym and argued for equal legal rights to men for women in Dutch society. She compared the rights of women to those of criminals.

During the later 1870s, Feddes also wrote letters to the women's weekly magazine Ons Streven.

== Death ==
Feddes died on 24 September 1882 in Leeuwarden.
