= Kristien Hemmerechts =

Belgian writer

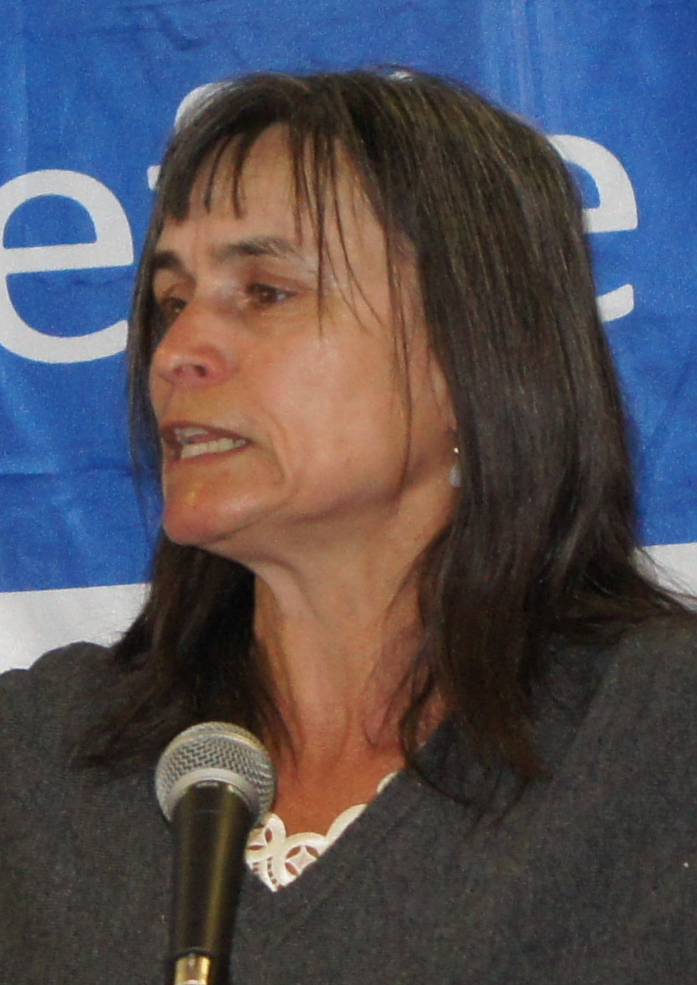
- Kristien Hemmerechts (2013)
- Born: 27 August 1955 (age 70); Brussels, Belgium
- Occupation: writer

Kristien Hemmerechts (born 27 August 1955) is a Belgian writer.

== Life ==
Hemmerechts studied Germanic philology at the Katholieke Universiteit Brussel (KUB) and the Katholieke Universiteit Leuven (KUL). Afterwards, she studied literary science in Amsterdam for a year. She married her first husband in 1978.

In 1986 she was granted a PhD for her dissertation A Plausible Story and a Plausible Way of Telling It: A structuralist analysis of Jean Rhys's novels.

In 1987 she divorced her husband. In 1992 she married the Flemish writer and poet Herman de Coninck. In 1997 he died from heart failure in Lisbon, Portugal. Hemmerechts wrote about his death in Taal Zonder Mij (1998).

In 2007 Hemmerechts married Bart Castelein.

Hemmerechts is a professor of English literature at the Katholieke Universiteit Brussel (KUB), and an instructor of Creative Writing at the Herman Teirlinck Instituut in Antwerp.

== Work ==
Hemmerechts published her first book in 1986, the collection First Fictions, Introduction 9 which was written in English. Her first novel Een Zuil van Zout was published in 1987. It received the Prijs van de provincie Brabant. In 1990 she received the Vlaamse driejaarlijkse Staatsprijs voor proza.

== Bibliography ==
- Een zuil van zout (A pillar of salt), 1987 (novel)
- Weerberichten, 1988 (short stories)
- Brede heupen, 1989 (novel)
- 's Nachts (Evenings), 1989 (short stories)
- Zonder Grenzen, 1991 (novel)
- Kerst en andere liefdesverhalen, 1992 (short stories)
- Wit zand (White sand), 1993 (novel)
- Lang geleden, 1994 (memoir)
- Amsterdam Retour, 1995 (travelogue)
- Veel vrouwen, af en toe een man, 1995 (novel)
- Kort kort lang, 1996 (short stories)
- Margot en de engelen, 1997 (novel)
- Taal zonder mij, 1998
- De tuin der onschuldigen, 1999 (novel)
- De kinderen van Arthur (Arthur's children), 2000 (novel)
- O, toen alles nog voorbij kon gaan, 2000 (short stories)
- Donderdagmiddag. Halfvier. (Thursday afternoon. Half past four), 2002 (novel)
- Een jaar als (g)een ander, 2003 (diary)
- De laatste keer, 2004 (novel)
- V, notities bij een reis naar Vietnam, 2004 (travelogue)
- De waar gebeurde geschiedenis van Victor en Clara Rooze, 2005 (novel)
- Als een kinderhemd, 2006 (memoir)

== Sources ==
- Kristien Hemmerechts (K.U. Brussel)
- Kristien Hemmerechts
