= George Kettmann =

Dutch poet, writer, journalist, and publisher

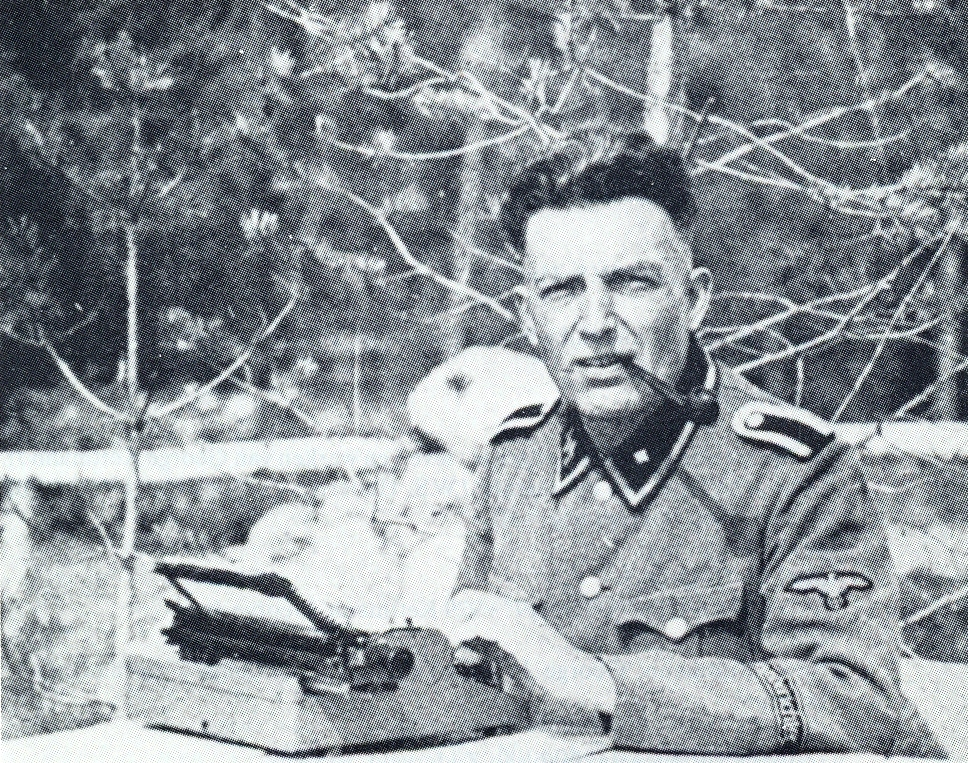
SS-Unterscharführer George Kettmann as a war correspondent in Karelia, 1943.

George Wilhelm Kettmann or George Kettmann Jr. (12 December 1898 in Amsterdam – 10 February 1970 in Roosendaal) was a Dutch poet, writer, journalist, and publisher who promoted Nazism in the Netherlands. With his wife, he founded the best known Dutch Nazi publishing house, De Amsterdamsche Keurkamer. Until 1941 he was editor in chief of Volk en Vaderland (People and Fatherland), the weekly journal of the National Socialist Movement in the Netherlands (NSB), the movement of Anton Mussert.

== Life and career ==
Kettmann was the eldest son of a businessman and worked for his father until the company was ruined by the financial crisis of 1930, after which he worked as a journalist. He joined the NSB on 2 August 1932. On 12 October he married Margot Warnsinck; they had started the publishing house, De Amsterdamsche Keurkamer, only shortly before he joined the party, on 14 or 21 July, with the aim of promoting a new völkisch ideology, which soon became specifically National Socialist. In 1939 the company published the Dutch translation of Hitler's Mein Kampf.

In the years before World War II, in addition to running the company, he edited Volk en Vaderland, the national weekly of the NSB (until 1941) and wrote and published prose, poetry and essays, showing enormous energy. Over the years his relation with Anton Mussert deteriorated, as Kettmann accused Mussert of being unable to grasp the true, revolutionary nature of Nazism. This led ultimately to his joining the Nederlandsche SS on 7 March 1942. In September 1942 Mussert expelled him from the NSB; Kettmann was considered too radical a Nazi. He went to the Eastern Front as a war correspondent.

After the war Kettmann fled to Belgium, where he was arrested in 1948. Back in the Netherlands, he was accused of:

- joining the German armed forces,
- aiding the enemy, Nazism and antisemitism,
- having written and published articles and poems glorifying National Socialism and antisemitism.

He was sentenced to 10 years in prison. After his release in 1955 he refrained from any political activity. He published some volumes of poetry, in which he demonstrates not having lost his Nazi ideology.

Ideologically he evolved from an Italian-style fascism (1931–1933) to a Dutch Nazism (1933–1940), then to a German-oriented Nazism (1940–1942) and finally to the most radical SS ideology, desiring one great Germanic empire in Europe (1942–1945). After the German defeat he returned to his ideas of the 1933-1940 period.

== Selected works ==
- 1928 - De glanzende draad der goden. Novel.
- 1930 - De vlam der steden. Coauthor: Ru le Cavelier. Novel.
- 1931 - Maan op het dak. Novel.
- 1933 - De oceaanvlucht van een olie-man. Novel.
- 1935 - De jonge leeuw, verzen. Poetry.
- 1936 - 'Om wille van het leven, kunst en gemeenschap. Essay.
- 1938 - Het erf aan zee. Poetry.
- 1940 - Om de nieuwe cultuur. Essay.
- 1942 - Jong groen om den helm. Poetry.
- 1943 - Bloed in de sneeuw. Poetry.
- 1944 - De verdrevene. Novel.
- 1949 - Leven in tweespalt: nagelaten geschriften van een nationaal-socialist. Autobiography. Published Hilversum: Flanor, 1999, ed. Willem Huberts, introduction by Louis Ferron. Flanorreeks 37. ISBN 978-90-73202-40-5.
- 1956 - De ballade van de dode Viking. Poetry.
- 1957 - Manuel. Published under the pseudonym Jan van de Wolk. Novel.
- 1962 - Zettericks van alle seizoenen. Published under the pseudonym Jan van de Wolk. Poetry.
- 1969 - Man vrouw kind. Poetry.

== Sources ==
- Willem Huberts. Schrijver tussen daad en gedachte, leven en werken van George Kettmann Jr. (1898–1970), met een bibliografie. The Hague: Stichting Bibliographia Neerlandica, 1987. ISBN 90-71313-08-5. (in Dutch)
- Frank van den Bogaard. "George Wilhelm Kettmann (1898–1970)". In: Een stoottroep in de letteren, 'Groot Nederland', de SS en de Nederlandse literatuur (1942–1944). The Hague: Stichting Bibliographia Neerlandica, 1987. ISBN 90-71313-07-7. (in Dutch)
- Willem Huberts. "Kettmann". In: Biografisch woordenboek van Nederland, deel 3. Ed. J. Charité. The Hague: Instituut voor Nederlandse Geschiedenis, 1989. pp. 322–324. ISBN 90-5216-006-6. (in Dutch)
- Gerard Groeneveld. "Kettmann in Karelië". In: Kriegsberichter, Nederlandse SS-oorlogsverslaggevers 1941-1945. Nijmegen: Vantilt, 2004. pp. 305–317. ISBN 90-77503-09-9. (in Dutch)
- George Kettmann and Margot Warnsinck. Uitgeverij "De Amsterdamsche Keurkamer". Archive 1926–53. Amsterdam: NIOD: Instituut voor Oorlogs-, Holocaust- en Genocidestudies. OCLC 66595793.
