= Sophia Elizabeth Peeters =

Dutch folklorist (1833–1916)

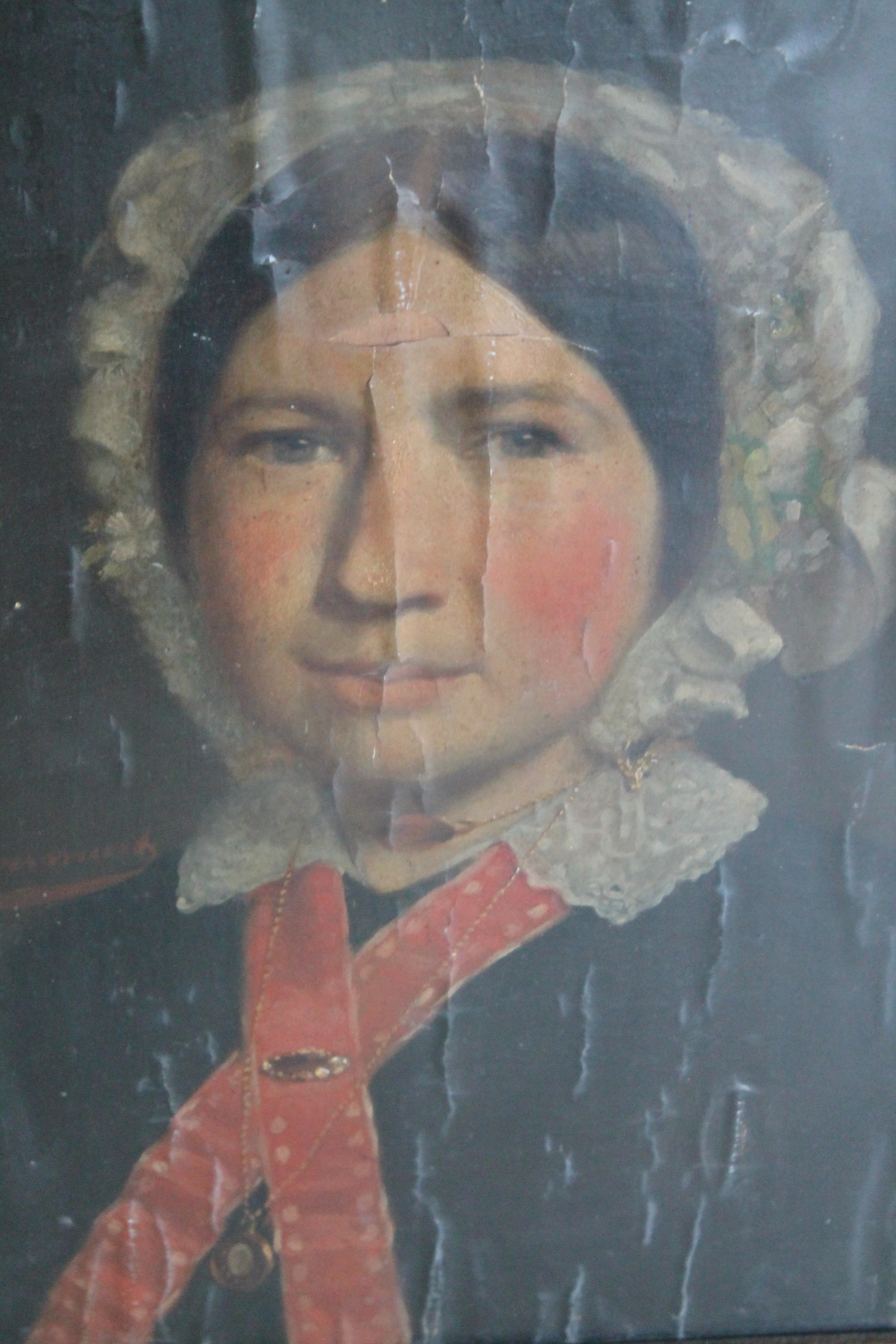
- Sophia Peeters
- Born: 30 June 1833; Sint-Pauwels, Belgium
- Died: 12 January 1916 (aged 82); Sint-Niklaas
- Other name: Vrouw Weyn
- Occupations: Folklorist, ethnographer

Sophia Elizabeth Peeters (30 June 1833 – 12 January 1916), also known as Vrouw Weyn, was a Belgian ethnologist who studiously published the folklore of the Wase area. She recited and wrote about stories, songs and poems from the region of Sint-Niklaas.

== Biography ==
Sophia Elizabeth Peeters was born on 30 June 1833 in Sint-Pauwels as the daughter of a Flemish shepherd and a farmer's daughter from Belsele. Her mother died when she was an infant of only twelve days; she was raised by her maternal grandparents. Sophia's childhood was marked by the stories told around the fireside, stories about witches, devils and other supernatural creatures that her grandparents shared.

On 16 June 1858, Sophia married Ludovicus Franciscus Weyn (1827–1917), a farmer from Sint-Niklaas. They had eleven children and settled on the farm of Ludovicus' parents in the Kleibeke district of Sint-Niklaas.

== Storyteller and writer ==
Peeters, also known as Vrouw Weyn (in English: Mrs. Weyn), became a well-known storyteller in her circle. She had a phenomenal memory and could tell countless stories, songs, and poems without notes. Around 1890 she started writing them down, which was remarkable considering her limited education. She wrote in a very personal style about various folklore subjects, including sagas, legends, songs, poems, prayers, weather proverbs and her knowledge of plants and herbs. She wrote most of her texts in school notebooks (called cahiers), but some took the form of letters.

Numerous contributions by Peeters were published in the folkloristic journal Vlaamsche Zanten, which was founded in 1899 by publisher Alfons Janssens and editor-in-chief Jozef Van Vlierberghe.

== Influence and recognition ==
Her talent and knowledge attracted the attention of local notables such as Alfons Janssens (1841–1906), a textile manufacturer and Flemish-minded Catholic member of parliament and priest Amaat Joos (1855–1937), director of the Episcopal Normal School of Sint-Niklaas, who used her folkloric knowledge for his Waasch Idioticon (1900), a dialect dictionary of the Waasland.

In July 1895, the famous West Flemish priest-poet Guido Gezelle (1830–1899) visited Sophie Weyn at her farm because she "wrote down old proverbs, the law and superstitions of the people and sent them to the magazine Biekorf." Peeters made numerous contributions to the folkloristic journal Vlaamsche Zanten, which was founded in 1899 by publisher Janssens and editor-in-chief Jozef Van Vlierberghe. She later described Gezelle's visit in an extensive thirty-page report in which she reconstructed every detail of that special day. Five years later, in 1900, a second West Flemish priest came to visit her: Hugo Verriest (1840–1922), a former pupil of Gezelle.

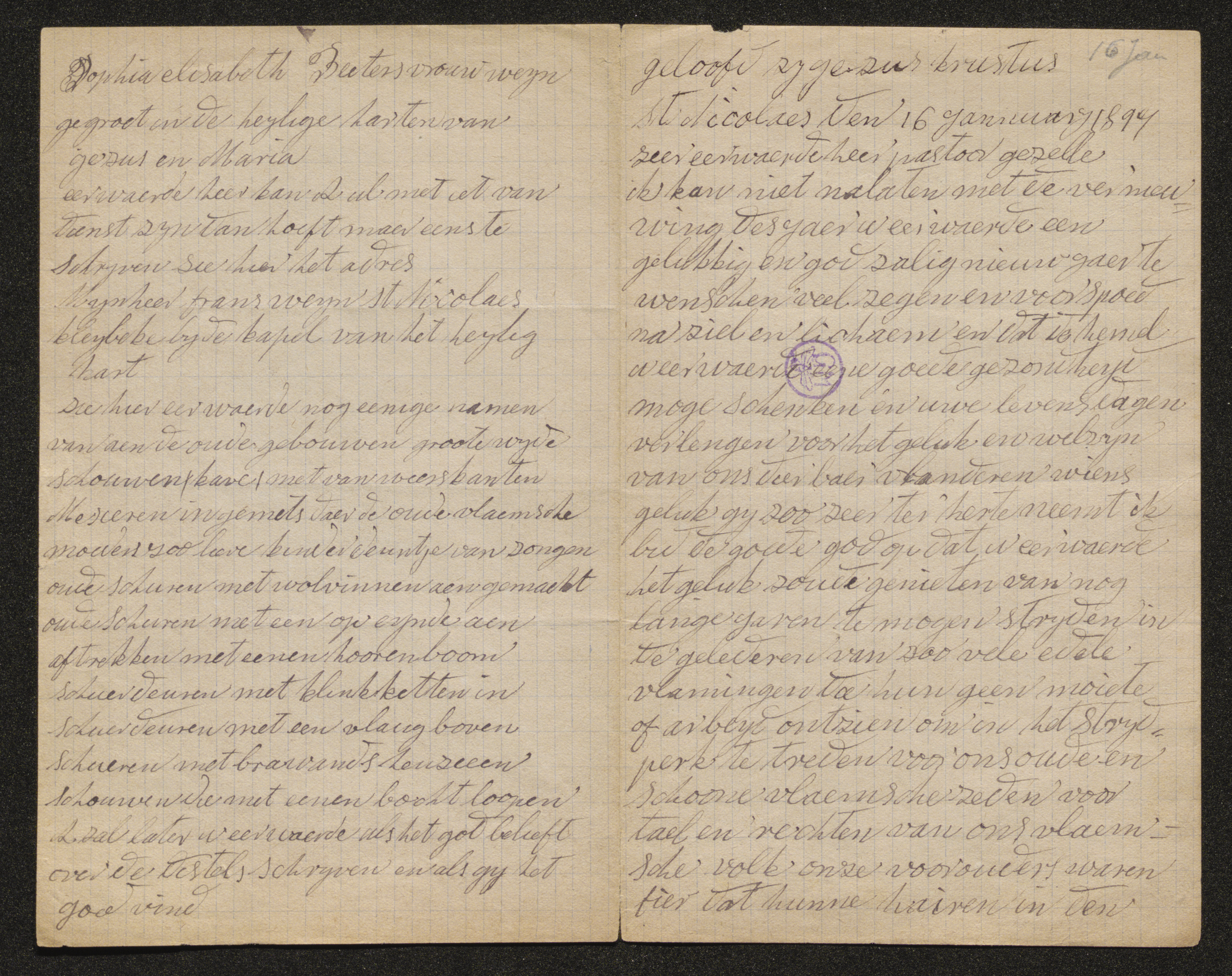
Letter from Sophia Peeters to Guido Gezelle (Sint-Niklaas, 16 January 1897). Public Library in Bruges, Guido Gezelle Archives, 6843

After her death on 12 January 1916 in Sint-Niklaas, Sophia's legacy has continued to live on in the writings she left behind. Although a significant portion of her work was lost, much information was preserved thanks to the publication of her texts in the books of Joos and Janssens, in contemporary magazines such as Volkskunde, Biekorf and Vlaamsche Zanten and, thanks to Marcellijn Dewulf (1898–1980) and Theo Penneman, in more recent publications such as the college magazine Ic Hou.

The Bruges Public Library keeps a letter from Mrs. Weyn to Guido Gezelle and some of her notebooks.

== Memorial plaque ==
Because Sophia Peeters is regarded as one of the most important figures in Wase folklore, on Thursday 7 July 2016, 100 years after her death, a memorial plaque was unveiled in her honor in De Salons van Sint-Niklaas. This took place in the context of the presentation of the Leeuwenpenning 2016, an annual event of Davidsfonds Sint-Niklaas. During the presentation, Luc Peleman also eulogized Mrs Weyn.
