= Herman de Coninck =

Belgian poet and journalist (1944–1997)

- Born: Herman August Paul De Coninck; 21 February 1944; Mechelen, Belgium
- Died: 22 May 1997 (aged 53); Lisbon, Portugal
- Occupations: Poet, essayist, journalist
- Spouse: Kristien Hemmerechts

Herman de Coninck (21 February 1944 – 22 May 1997) was a Belgian poet, essayist, journalist and publisher.

== Life ==
Herman de Coninck was born in Mechelen, Belgium, where his parents ran a Catholic bookshop. He attended the Sint-Rombouts College in Mechelen where he contributed to the school newspaper. Determined to become a writer, he studied Germanic philology at the Katholieke Universiteit Leuven. While in Leuven he wrote for the University paper Universitas. Graduating in 1966, he took up teaching in Berchem while he lived in Heverlee, near Leuven. In 1967 he fulfilled his compulsory civilian duty in the Belgian army.

In 1970 he left teaching to become an editor of the weekly magazine HUMO, a post he held until 1983. During this period he regularly delivered interviews together with Piet Piryns. These interviews were collected and published as Woe is Woe in de Nedderlens in 1972.

Tired of interviews, he became editor-in-chief of the magazine Nieuw Wereldtijdschrift in 1983 until the time of his death. Under his direction, NWT combined journalism and literature. Since De Coninck was less of a businessman than a writer, the magazine was not a commercial success.

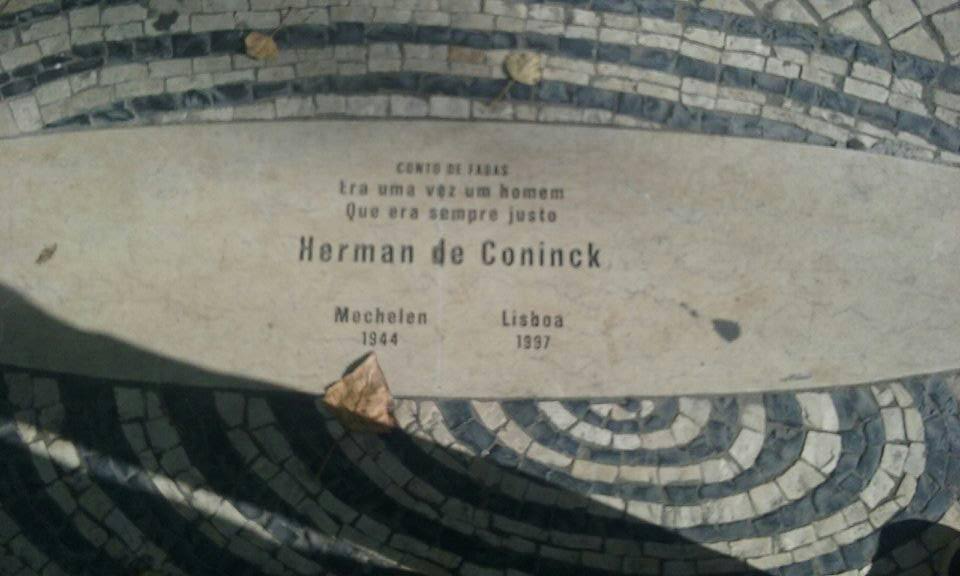
Herman de Coninck Plaque in Lisbon. Reads, "Fairy Tale. Once upon a time there was a man who was always just."

While on his way to a literary colloquium with several other Flemish and Dutch poets and writers (amongst them Hugo Claus, Anna Enquist and Gerrit Komrij), Herman de Coninck collapsed in the streets of Lisbon, Portugal on May 22, 1997. He died there at the age of 53 from a heart failure. A year later, his widow Kristien Hemmerechts wrote a very personal and biographical monologue entitled Taal Zonder Mij (1998).

== Work ==
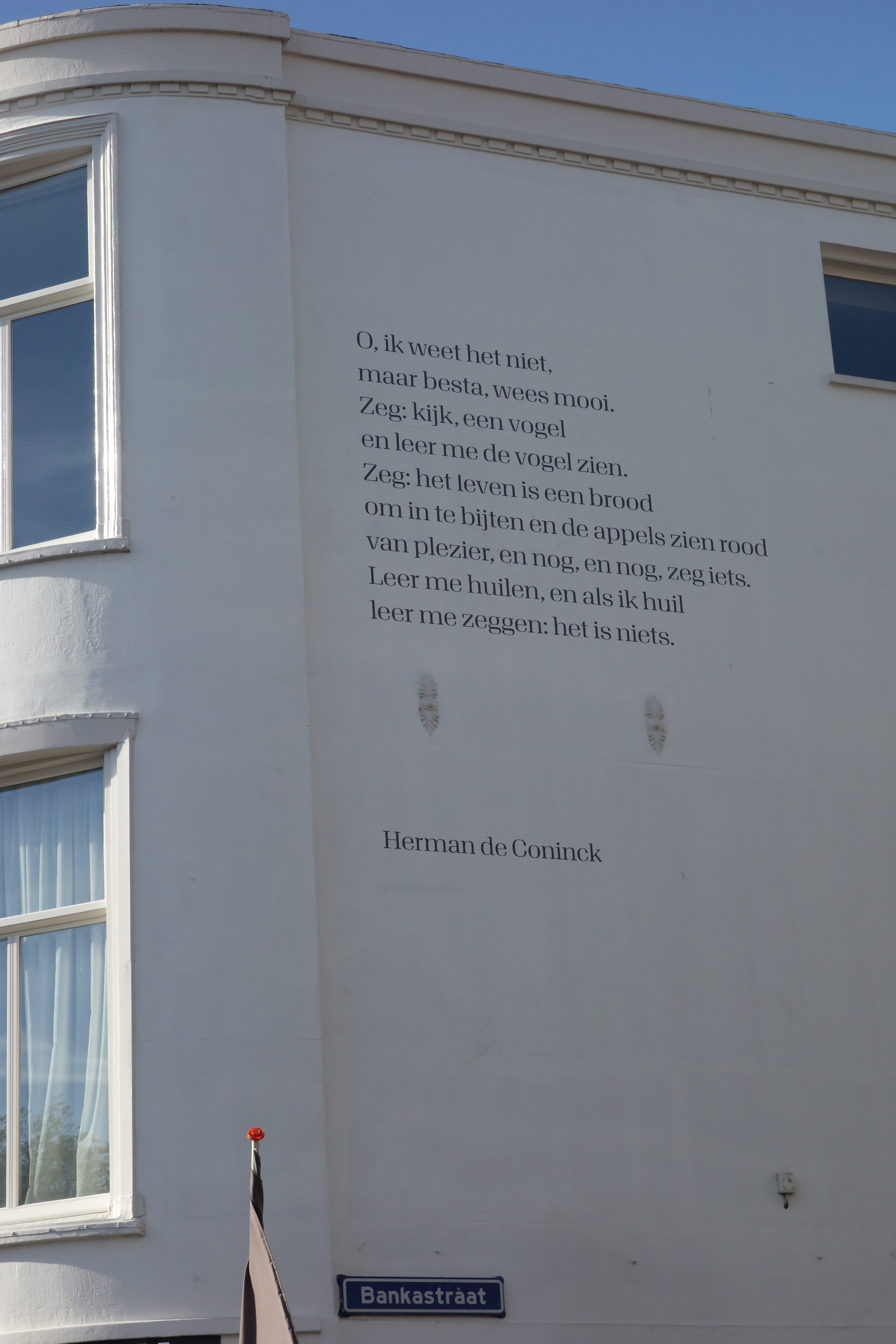
Wall poem of De Coninck in The Hague (2019)

As a poet, De Coninck aimed to produce poetry for the masses. His first volume, De Lenige Liefde, appeared in 1969, becoming the best-selling volume of 20th-century Flemish poetry and winning literary prizes such as the "Yang-prijs" (1969) and the "Prijs van de Provincie Antwerpen" (1971). The collection has a relativating tone, and not seldom the poems have an ironic undertone.

The death of de Coninck's first wife, An Somers, in a car accident in 1971 began a difficult period in his life. The loss of his wife deeply influenced his second volume of poetry, Zolang er sneeuw ligt(1975). The collection won both the "Dirk Martensprijs van de Stad Aalst" (1976) and the "Prijs van de Vlaamse Provincieën" (1978). Later collections, such as Met een Klank van Hobo (1980) and De Hectaren van het Geheugen (1985) show a shift to a more romantic topos in his poetry. He also published the collections "Enkelvoud" (1991), "Schoolslag" (1994) and "Vingerafdrukken" (1997).

His essays on poetry were collected and published as Over de troost van pessimisme (1983), De flaptekstlezer (1992) and Intimiteit onder de melkweg (1994).

De Coninck was also a prolific letter-writer, keeping the letters he received and making copies of all the letters he sent. His estate contained 15,000 letters. A collection of these, selected and edited by Hugo Brems, was published as Een aangename postumiteit in 2004.

== Bibliography ==
Poetry

- 1969. De lenige liefde. Brugge: Orion – Desclée De Brouwer. 70p.
- 1975. Zolang er sneeuw ligt. Brugge: Orion.
- 1980. Met een klank van hobo. Amsterdam: Van Oorschot. 52p.
- 1984. Onbegonnen werk: gedichten 1964-1982. Antwerpen: Manteau. 212p.
- 1985. De hectaren van het geheugen. Antwerpen: Manteau. 59p.
- 1991. Enkelvoud. Amsterdam: De Arbeiderspers. 51p.
- 1994. Schoolslag. Amsterdam: De Arbeiderspers. 61p.
- 1997. Vingerafdrukken Amsterdam: De Arbeiderspers. 66p.

Fiction

- 1996. De cowboybroek van Maria Magdalena (en andere reisverhalen). Amsterdam: De Arbeiderspers. 134p.

Non-fiction

- 1972. Woe is woe in de Nedderlends? Amsterdam: Manteau. Co-authored by Piet Piryns.
- 1983. Over de troost van pessimisme: essays. Antwerpen: Manteau. 256p.
- 1992. De flaptekstlezer. Amsterdam: De Arbeiderspers. 242p.
- 1994. Intimiteit onder de melkweg: over poëzie. Amsterdam: De Arbeiderspers. 223p.
- 1995. De vliegende keeper: essays over poëzie. Amsterdam: De Arbeiderspers. 251p.

== Legacy ==
In 1998, a minor planet was named after de Coninck.

== See also ==
- Flemish literature
