= Siebren van der Werf =

Dutch physicist and author

Siebren van der Werf (born 1942) is a Dutch physicist and author of non-fiction books.

Van der Werf worked as a researcher at the Kernfysisch Versneller Instituut (nl) in Groningen. He retired in 2004.

After retirement, van der Werf concentrated on writing popular books and articles on navigation tools and atmospheric phenomena. In Drieduizend jaar navigatie op de sterren (2022) he discusses the development of the navigation tools from Ancient Greece and Polynesia to the 20th century.

== Books ==
- Het Nova Zembla verschijnsel (2011, Historische Uitgeverij Groningen);
- Astronavigatie van Columbus tot Willem Barentsz voor de moderne zeiler (with Dick Huges, 2016, Lanasta), translated to German and English (Astronavigation from Columbus to William Barentsz for the modern sailor);
- Drieduizend jaar navigatie op de sterren, mythevorming en geschiedenis (2022, Querido).
