= Frank van Ree =

Dutch psychiatrist

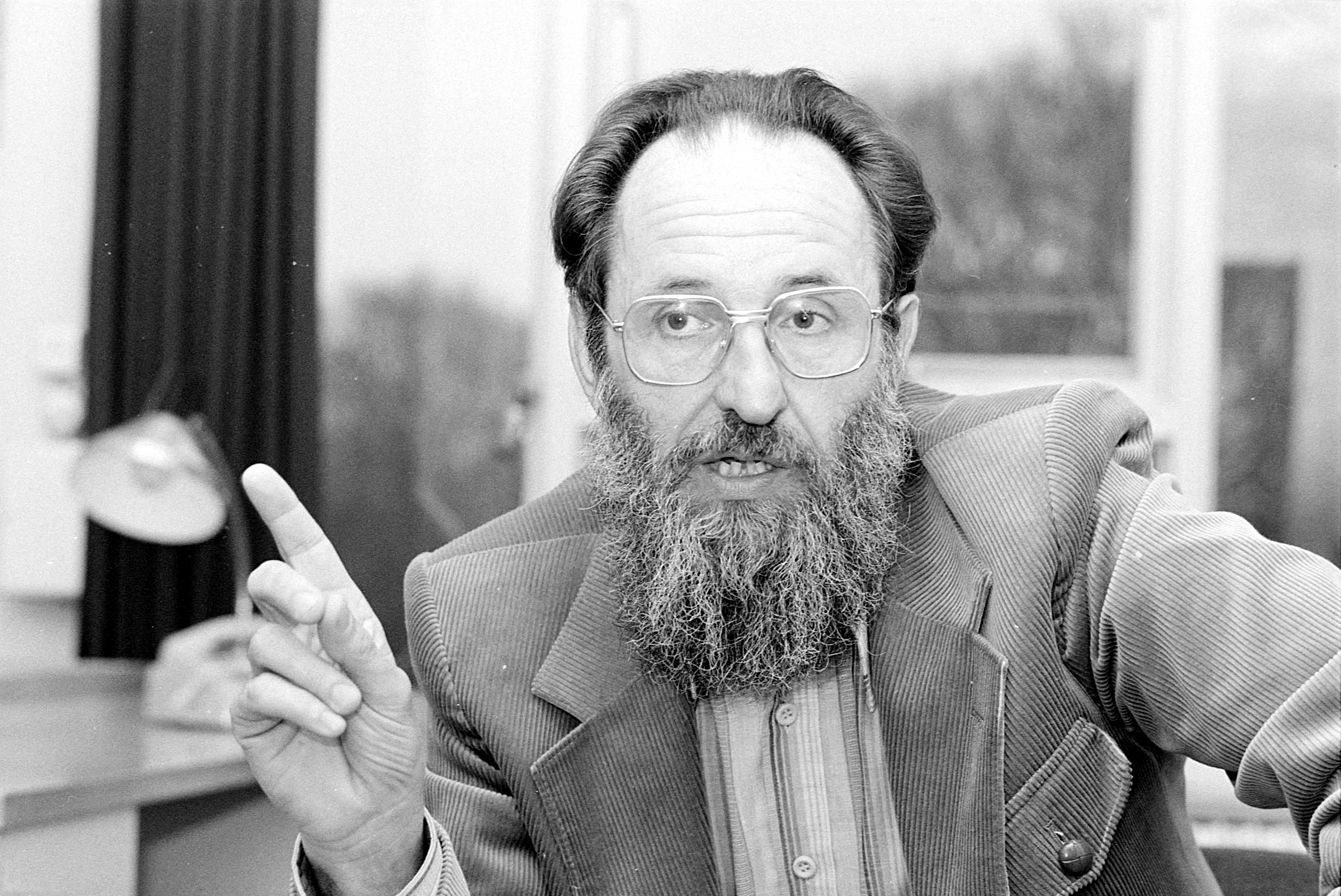
- Born: January 1, 1927
- Died: October 5, 2013 (aged 86)

Frank van Ree (1927–2013) was a Dutch psychiatrist and writer. He has published published multiple books on the topic of human behavior, including Een halve eeuw in de Nederlandse psychiatrie: Don Quichot of klokkenluider?, Pedofilie: een controversiële kwestie and GGZ en levensbeschouwing.
