= Sadık Yemni =

Turkish-Dutch science fiction writer (born 1951)

Sadık Yemni (born 1951) is a Turkish-Dutch science fiction writer. Yemni is the author of 22 novels published in the Turkish language, as well as a variety of short stories, essays, plays, and film scripts. He is known particularly for De roos van Amsterdam ("The rose of Amsterdam").

== Biography ==
Yemni was born in Istanbul, Turkey, but moved with his parents to İzmir when he was still a baby. He studied Chemistry at Ege University, before emigrating to Amsterdam. He developed an interest in literature while working on the railways. Yemni's literary debut was a collection of stories in Turkish on the lives of guest workers. Though he writes in Turkish and publishes in both languages, his novels are oriented primarily towards the Dutch market. Yemni's works include the 1987 short stories De ijzerensnavel – verhalen, the 1991 story De geest van de brug, the 1992 play Het station, and the novels De roos van Amsterdam (1993), De ridders van Amsterdam (1994) and De amulet (1995). His last novel, Çağrılan: KarsH (2019), is the first Turkish Sufi Science Fiction (Su-Fi).

== Bibliography ==
Published in Dutch:

- De IJzeren Snavel (volume of short stories)
- De Geest van de Brug (diary)
- Het Station – Toneeltekst
- De roos van Amsterdam (1993, vertaling uit het Turks Amsterdam'ın Gülü, 1993)
- De ridders van Amsterdam (1994)
- Detective Orhan en het vermiste meisje (1996, jeugdboek)
- De vierde ster (2000, vert. uit het Turks door Margreet Dorleijn)
- De amulet, Prometheus, 1995 (vert. uit het Turks (Muska) door Cees Priem, 1995)
- Paradigma – Toneel,

Published in Turkish:

- Muska (1996)
- Amsterdam'ın Gülü (1996)
- Öte Yer (1997, 'De Gene Zijde')
- Metros (2002)
- Çözücü (2003, 'Oplosser' SF thriller )
- Ölümsüz (2004)
- Yatır (2005)
- Muhabbet Evi (2006)
- Durum 429 (2007)
- Çağrılan: KarsH (2019)

Published in German:

- Das Haus der Herzen (2010)
