= Johnny van Doorn =

Dutch writer, poet and performer

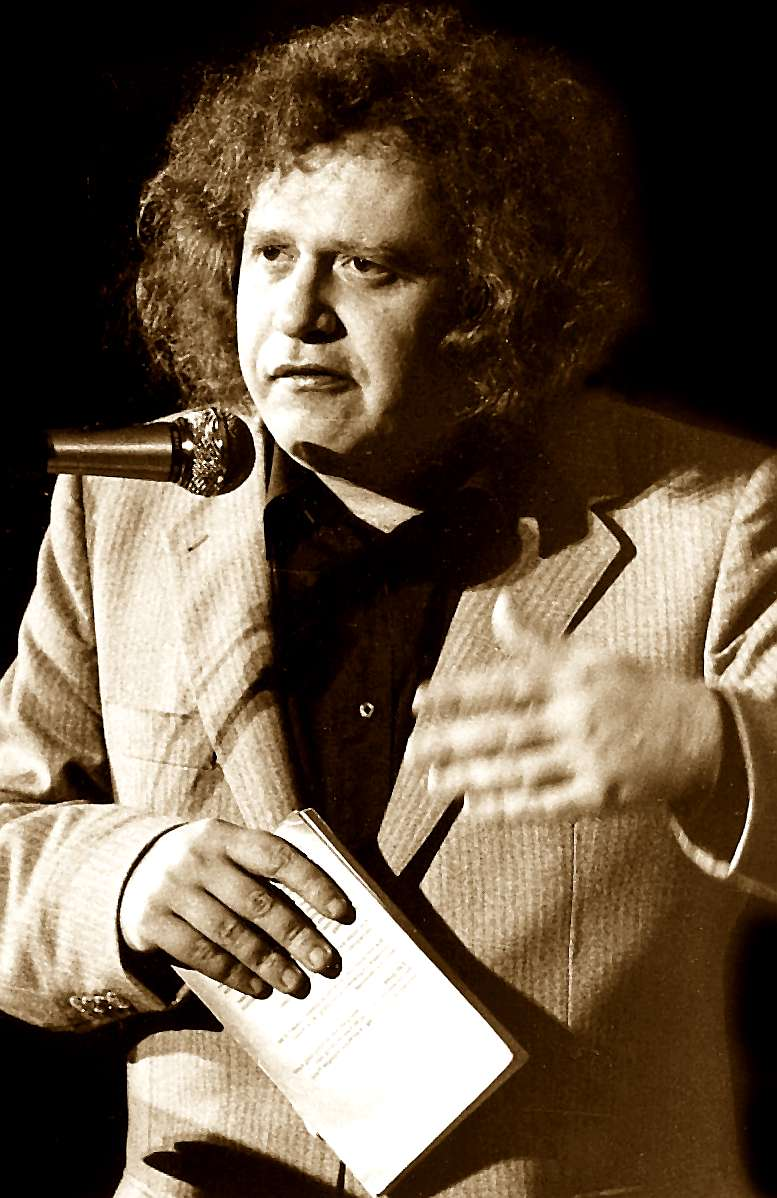
- Johnny van Doorn
- Born: Johan van Doorn; 12 November 1944; Beekbergen, Netherlands
- Died: 26 January 1991 (aged 46); Amsterdam, Netherlands
- Occupations: Writer, performer
- Writing career
- Pen name: Johnny the Selfkicker
- Language: Dutch
- Genres: Poetry, short stories

Johan "Johnny" van Doorn (12 November 1944 – 26 January 1991) was a Dutch writer, poet, and performer, first in Arnhem, later in the country's capital Amsterdam. As a poet Van Doorn called himself Johnny the Selfkicker, a nickname fulfilled by means of wild, often haphazard, performances, during which he never failed to work himself into a frenzy, often resulting in him collapsing in front of an astonished audience, for example in the middle of a large retail outlet.

== Early life ==
Johan van Doorn was born on 12 November 1944, during the final stages of World War II, in the village of Beekbergen. His parents had fled there from their native city of Arnhem, where Operation Market Garden was culminating in the Battle of Arnhem. Van Doorn would later spend most of his childhood and youth in the ruins of Arnhem.

His childhood years were not easy for Van Doorn, because he was born from a marriage between a Dutch man and a German woman.

== Career ==
Later he became well known for his "primordial verse", as he used to call it; poetry at its very roots, the cradle of humanity from which nothing emanates but hoarse and raw screams and sounds that hardly have any resemblance with actual words and their meaning.

Early in his career Van Doorn was not very popular. Not just his poetry, but his entire posture, as well as his frantic and openly demonstrated drug use were offensive to many people during those otherwise so orderly and phlegmatic postwar decades in the Netherlands, when student uproars, hippies and "altered states of perception" had not yet been heard of. Many people would later come to admire the dedication that characterises Van Doorn's performances and writing.

Van Doorn died on 26 January 1991 in Amsterdam, at the age of 46.

== Namesake ==
A Dutch bi-annual Prize for Spoken Literature and a square in the centre of Arnhem are both named after him.

== Bibliography ==
Poetry

- (1966) Een nieuwe mongool (A new retard) as Johnny the Selfkicker
- (1968) Een heilige huichelaar (A holy hypocrite) as Johnny the Selfkicker
- (1994) Verzamelde gedichten (Collected poems)

Prose

- (1972) Mijn kleine hersentjes (My little brains)
- (1977) De geest moet waaien (The spirit must blow)
- (1984) Gevecht tegen het zuur (Fight against the acid)
- (1986) Langzame wals (Slow waltz)
- (1988) Door de weken heen: dagboeken (Through the weeks: diaries)
- (1990) De lieve vrede: legendarische momenten 1944–1990 (The dear peace: legendary moments 1944–1990)
