= Willem van den Hout =

Dutch writer and publicist

Wilhelmus Henricus Maria van den Hout ('s-Hertogenbosch, 3 June 1915 – The Hague, 24 February 1985) was a Dutch writer and publicist, best known as the writer (under the pseudonym Willy van der Heide) of the Bob Evers series of children's books.

Van den Hout lost his credentials as a journalist after World War II for having collaborated with the Nazi propaganda machine, but gained commercial success with the Bob Evers series. He also used the pseudonyms Willy Waterman, Willem W. Waterman, Sylvia Sillevis, Victor Valstar, Victor H. Huitink, Joke Raviera, Zsa Zsa Ferguson and C.B. McInverness, M.D., Ph.D., and translated English literature into Dutch.

== Biography ==
Willem van den Hout was born 3 June 1915 in 's-Hertogenbosch, his father from Brabant and his mother from Groningen, a mixed background that may have resulted in a kind of split personality later in life. In 1937, after high school and military service, he got a job with the Philips company as a PR writer. He married Louise Grossouw the same year; they had two sons.

Van den Hout was moved to the department for advertising abroad in 1938, and traveled to the United States and visited Hollywood. He used the experience to write a burlesque satire about the film industry, published in 1939 under the pseudonym Willem W. Waterman, on his employer's request. The novel centered on a crew filming on an island in the Pacific, which was to be a regular setting for his later novels.

On the eve of World War II, in 1939, van den Hout again joined the military, and turned his experiences into a novel published in 1941, De kruistocht van generaal Taillehaeck. This was another burlesque but also offered a serious critique of the Dutch military in wartime, which van den Hout considered to have been weakened by individualism and pacifism, a critique continued in his 1943 novel Een strijd om Nederland. He joined the Nationaal Front in January 1941 and led their propaganda department; he left the organization in August of the same year, voluntarily he said later, though in his semi-autobiographical Bankroet van een politieke beweging, published under his own name in 1943, his character is fired. After leaving the Nationaal Front he began a career as a freelance writer, writing for a number of fascist and Nazist-associated publications, including De Residentiebode and Jeugd. For the latter he wrote, as Willy van der Heide, the feuilleton De avonturen van 3 jongens in de Stille Zuidzee, the genesis for the later Bob Evers adventures. In various other publications, writing as Willy Waterman, he advertised his own writings, even criticizing a radio adaptation of De avonturen van 3 jongens.

Much of his work during the war evidences a desire to mythologize his own experiences; he later claimed that his work for Nazi publications was in fact done as a double agent. For the magazine De Gil he wrote pieces (in the vein of Esquire) that made fun of the NSB, the German occupiers, and the Dutch government in exile—in reality, De Gil was funded by the Hauptabteilung für Volksaufklärung und Propaganda, the German propaganda department. (In De Gil, van den Hout coined the term Dolle Dinsdag, for the day in 1944 when Germans and their collaborators panicked at the supposed imminent invasion of the Netherlands.) After that magazine was shut down he continued working for its radio-version, De Gil-Club, which, supported by the Germans, pretended to be an illegal radio station.

He was arrested after the war, spent three years in jail, and was banned from working as a journalist for ten years. He divorced in 1948 and married Anneliese Jülkenbeck in 1952. After divorcing his second wife in 1956, he married Marjon Niemeijer in 1958. They had a son and a daughter.

He died on 24 February 1985 of a heart attack.

== Bob Evers ==
On 19 May 1949 van den Hout signed a contract with publishers M. Stenvert & Zoon (later De Eekhoorn) to publish his Bob Evers series. The books revolve around three boys: Arie Roos, Jan Prins and American Bob Evers.

The Bob Evers series originally consisted of 32 volumes published from 1949 to 1963. From 1965, the series were published as pocket books with some minor updates, and the order of the first six volumes was changed. In 1967, van den Hout sold all rights to Stenvert publishers for ƒ100,000. When the series became a much bigger success than anticipated, this led to a conflict with Stenvert.

In 1977, he published two more volumes (34 and 35) with another publisher, in breach of his contract with Stenvert.

After van den Hout died, volumes 34 and 35 were partly re-written by author Peter de Zwaan. De Zwaan also completed van den Hout's unfinished manuscripts for volumes 33 and 36 and continued to write Bob Evers books, extending the series to over 50 volumes.

Three of the books have been translated into Afrikaans, and several of the books have been re-published as comics in the Algemeen Dagblad and as comic books.

== Works ==
=== Bob Evers series ===
- 1. Een overval in de lucht (1949)
- 2. De jacht op het koperen kanon (1950)
- 3. Sensatie op een Engelse vrachtboot (1950)
- 4. Avonturen in de Stille Zuidzee (1950)
- 5. Drie jongens op een onbewoond eiland (1950)
- 6. De strijd om het goudschip (1951)
- 7. Tumult in een toeristenhotel (1951)
- 8. Drie jongens als circusdetective (1952)
- 9. Een dollarjacht in een D-trein (1952)
- 10. Een speurtocht door Noord-Afrika (ca. 1952)
- 11. Drie jongens en een caravan (1953)
- 12. Kabaal om een varkensleren koffer (1953)
- 13. Een motorboot voor een drijvend flesje (1953)
- 14. Een klopjacht op een Kapitein (1954)
- 15. Een raderboot als zilvervloot (1954)
- 16. Nummer negen seint New York (1954)
- 17. Een meesterstunt in Mexico (1955)
- 18. Trammelant op Trinidad (1955)
- 19. Vreemd krakeel in Californië (1955)
- 20. Lotgevallen rond een locomotief (1955)
- 21. Pyjama-rel in Panama (1956)
- 22. Vreemd gespuis in een warenhuis (ca. 1954)
- 23. Wilde sport om een nummerbord (ca. 1954)
- 24. Hoog spel in Hong-Kong (1958)
- 25. Een vliegtuigsmokkel met verrassingen (1958)
- 26. Stampij om een schuiftrompet (1959)
- 27. Kunstgrepen met kunstschatten (1959)
- 28. Bombarie om een bunker (1960)
- 29. Ali Roos als Arie Baba (1960)
- 30. Heibel in Honoloeloe (1961)
- 31. Arie Roos wordt geheim agent (1961)
- 32. Cnall-effecten in Casablanca (1963)
- 33. Een zeegevecht met watervrees (1987, unfinished. Completed by Peter de Zwaan)
- 34. Bob Evers belegert Fort B (1977. Re-issued 1988 in a version edited by Peter de Zwaan)
- 35. Arie Roos als ruilmatroos (1977. Re-issued 1988 in a version edited by Peter de Zwaan)
- 36. Kloppartijen in een koelhuis (1989, unfinished. Completed by Peter de Zwaan)

=== Other works ===
- van Cleef, Monique; Waterman, William (1973). House of Pain. Lyle Stuart. ISBN 978-0-8184-0163-3.
- van der Heide, Willy (1956). Atompiraten (in German). trans. Ernst Bluth. Christliche Verlagsanstalt.

== Notes and references ==
=== Reference bibliography ===
- Beringen, John (1993). Het verschijnsel Bob Evers. Warung Bambu.
- van Gelder, Henk (2008-03-13). "Hout, Wilhelmus Henricus Maria van den (1915-1985)".
- Schenk, Roger. "Encyclopaedia Apriana".
