= Ark Prize of the Free Word =

The Arkprijs van het Vrije Woord (Ark Prize of the Free Word) is a symbolic award created in 1951 by Herman Teirlinck and the editorial team of the Nieuw Vlaams Tijdschrift (New Flemish magazine) to counteract ideologically driven restrictions on the freedom of expression.

Teirlinck wanted to spotlight those persons who actively promote the freedom of opinion. No financial reward is associated with the prize. The names of the laureates are engraved in an art object (the Ark) kept in the AMVC in Antwerp.

== Laureates of the Arkprijs van het Vrije Woord ==
- 1951 Christine D'Haen for 'Gedichten'
- 1952 Hugo Claus for De Metsiers
- 1953 Maurice D'Haese for De Heilige Gramschap
- 1954 Frans Goddemaere for 'Nola'
- 1955 Jos De Haes for 'Gedaanten'
- 1956 Frans De Bruyn for 'Tekens in Steen'
- 1957 Albert Bontridder for Dood Hout
- 1958 Ivo Michiels for 'Het Afscheid'
- 1959 Libera Carlier for 'Action Station - Go !
- 1960 Ward Ruyslinck for De madonna met de buil
- 1961 Hugues C. Pernath for 'Het Masker Man'
- 1962 Georges Hebbelinck for 'De Journalist'
- 1963 Paul Snoek for 'Richelieu'
- 1964 Daniel Robberechts for 'Zesmaal'
- 1965 Willy Roggeman for 'Blues for Glazen Blazers'
- 1966 Astère M. Dhondt for 'God in Vlaanderen'
- 1967 Jef Geeraerts for De Troglodieten
- 1968 C.C. Krijgelmans for 'Homunculi'
- 1969 Patrick Conrad for 'Mercantile Marine Engineering'
- 1970 Roger van de Velde for Recht op Antwoord
- 1971 Eddy Van Vliet for Columbus Tevergeefs
- 1972 Marcel van Maele for Ik ruik mensenvlees, zei de reus
- 1973 Rob Goswin for 'Vanitas Vanitas'
- 1974 Fernand Auwera for 'Zelfportret met Gesloten Ogen'
- 1975 Internationale Nieuwe Scene for 'Mistero Buffo'
- 1976 Leonard Nolens for Twee Vormen van Zwijgen
- 1977 Freddy de Vree for 'Steden en Sentimenten'
- 1978 Roger M.J. De Neef for 'Gestorven Getal'
- 1979 Frans Boenders for 'Denken in Tweespraak'
- 1980 Lucienne Stassaert for Parfait Amour
- 1981 Robbe De Hert for his movies.
- 1982 Maurice De Wilde for 'De Nieuwe Orde'
- 1983 Bert Van Hoorick for In Tegenstroom
- 1984 Leo Pleysier for Kop in Kas
- 1985 Daniel Buyle for his BRT-Journalism
- 1986 Tone Brulin for his theatre work.
- 1987 De Morgen and Paul Goossens for their journalism
- 1988 Leo Apostel for his philosophical work
- 1989 Stefan Hertmans for Bezoekingen
- 1990 André De Beul for his political courage
- 1991 Frie Leysen for ten year DeSingel
- 1992 Paula D'Hondt for her work for immigrants
- 1993 Jan Blommaert and Jef Verschueren for 'Het Belgisch Migrantendebat'
- 1994 Gerard Alsteens (GAL) for his graphical work
- 1995 Tom Lanoye for 'Maten en Gewichten'
- 1996 Gie van den Berghe for 'Getuigen'
- 1997 Wannes Van de Velde for his music
- 1998 Pjeroo Roobjee for his art
- 1999 Sophie de Schaepdrijver for De Groote Oorlog
- 2000 ZAK for his cartoons
- 2001 Ludo Abicht for Intelligente Emotie
- 2002 Pol Hoste for 'De Lucht naar Mirabel'
- 2003 Wim Distelmans for his contribution to the legalisation of euthanasia
- 2004 Rik Pinxten for 'De Artistieke Samenleving'
- 2005 Christine Van Broeckhoven, molecular geneticist
- 2006 Marleen Temmerman for 'Onrust in de Onderbuik'
- 2007 Roma vzw
- 2008 David Van Reybrouck for 'Missie'
- 2009 Luc Huyse for Seismograaf van de samenleving
- 2010 Geert Buelens: Europa Europa
- 2011 Philippe Van Parijs for his sociopolitical and ethical theories
- 2012 Peter Holvoet-Hanssen for 'De Reis naar Inframundo'
- 2013 Paul De Grauwe for reconsidering traditional economic models and arguing against the perversities of raw capitalism
- 2014 Jeroen Olyslaegers for Winst/Occupy Antwerpen
- 2015 Fikry El Azzouzi for Drarrie in de nacht (roman) en Reizen Jihad (theater)
- 2016 Reinhilde Decleir for Tutti Fratelli
- 2017 Apache.be, research journalism
- 2018 PEN Vlaanderen, commitment to free speech
- 2019 Anuna De Wever and Kyra Gantois, initiators of the Flemish Youth for Climate movement.
- 2020 Jozef Deleu, founding editor of the reviews Ons Erfdeel and Het liegend konijn.
- 2021 Caroline Pauwels

== See also ==
- Flemish literature
