= Pragmatics (journal) =

Peer-reviewed journal

- Discipline: Pragmatics
- Language: English
- Edited by: Helmut Gruber

Publication details
- History: 1991-present
- Publisher: John Benjamins Publishing Company on behalf of the International Pragmatics Association
- Frequency: Quarterly
- Impact factor: 1.1 (2022)

Standard abbreviations
- ISO 4: Pragmatics

Indexing
- ISSN: 1018-2101 (print); 2406-4238 (web)
- OCLC no.: 473481326

Links
- Journal homepage; Online access; Online archive

Pragmatics is a quarterly peer-reviewed academic journal covering the field of pragmatics, a subfield of linguistics. It was established in 1991 and is published by John Benjamins Publishing Company on behalf of the International Pragmatics Association. The editor-in-chief is Helmut Gruber (University of Vienna).

== Abstracting and indexing ==
The journal is abstracted and indexed in:

- Arts and Humanities Citation Index
- EBSCO Information Services
- Index Islamicus
- Modern Language Association Database
- ProQuest databases
- Scopus
- Social Sciences Citation Index

According to the Journal Citation Reports, the journal has a 2022 impact factor of 1.1.
