= Vic Legley =

Belgian- French violist and composer (1915–1994)

Victor Legley (18 June 1915 in Hazebrouck – 28 November 1994 in Ostend) was a Belgian violist and composer of classical music, of French birth. He first studied in Ypres with Lionel Blomme (1897–1984). In 1935 he matriculated at the Royal Conservatory in Brussels, and there won awards in the study of viola, fugue, counterpoint and chamber music.

In 1941, Legley began studying with Jean Absil, and in 1943 he received the second Belgian Prix de Rome. After World War II he played in the Brussels Opera Orchestra and also in the Déclin Quartet, where he encountered the music of Béla Bartók and of Arnold Schoenberg. At about this time (in 1942) he wrote his first symphony, first of a series of eight (the last of which was written in 1993 and premiered in 1994), and also his first string quartet (first of five, 1941–63, 1990) (Randel, Don Michael (1996).)

He was chairman of SABAM (the authors' rights association) from 1980 to 1992, and from 1986 to 1990 president of the Union of Belgian Composers.

His last years saw a turn towards wind-band music; his Symphony No. 7 is scored for this ensemble. His output also includes 3 violin concertos, a viola concerto, and a piano concerto, among others.

== Selected works ==
Opera

- De cluyte van de twee naakten of de mooie onbekende (1966)

Orchestral

- Symfonische variaties op een oud Vlaams lied (Symphonic Variations on an Old Flemish Song), op.6 (1941)
- Symphony No.1, op.10 (1942)
- Suite, op.18 (1944)
- Miniatuursymphonie (1946)
- Musique pour une tragédie grecque, op.24 (1946)
- Symphony No.2, op.29 (1947)
- De gouden rivier (1947)
- De boer die sterft for narrator and orchestra, op.34 (1950); text by Karel van de Woestijne
- Divertimento, op.41 (1952)
- Symphony No.3, op.42 (1953)
- Sérénade for string orchestra, op.44 no.2 (1957)
- Le bal des Halles (1954)
- Kleine Carnaval, Overture (1954)
- Ouverture pour une Comédie de Goldoni, op.53 (1958)
- La Cathédrale d'acier (The Steel Cathedral), Symphonic Sketch after Fernand Steven, op.52 (1958)
- Trios pièces (3 Pieces) for chamber orchestra, op.57 (1960)
- Diptyque, op.60 (1964)
- Symphony No.4, op.61 (1964)
- Symphony No.5, op.64 (1965)
- Espaces for string orchestra (1970)
- Symphony No.6 "Ypriana", op.88 (1976)
- Before Endeavours Fade for string orchestra, op.92 (1977)
- Automne, op.113 (1989)
- Symphony No.8, op.121 (1988)

Concert band and brass band

- Trois mouvements for brass and percussion, op.76 (1969)
- Le Bal des Halles for concert band, op.43b (1977)
- Before Endeavours Fade, op.92b (1977, 1979)
- Hommage à Jean Absil for saxophone quartet and concert band, op.97 (1980)
- Volharden for brass band, op.98 (1979)
- Drieluik for brass band, op.99 (1980)
- Divertimento for woodwind ensemble, op.104 (1984)
- Paradise Regained, op.26b (1986)
- Symphony No.7 for large concert band, op.112 (1989)

1. Quasi adagio, dolcissimo e molto sostenuto
2. Allegro-scherzando
3. Quasi adagio
4. Finale

- Petite Introduction pour une Fête Royale (1990–1991)
- Fanfare J(eunesses) M(usicales)

Concertante

- Concerto No.1 for violin and orchestra, op.27 (1947)
- Concertino for percussion and orchestra, op.49 (1956)
- Concerto for piano and orchestra, op.39 (1952, 1959)
- Concerto for harp and orchestra, op.66 (1966)
- Concerto No.2 for violin and orchestra, op.67 (1966)
- Concerto for viola and orchestra, op.78 (1971)
- Concerto Grosso for violin, alto saxophone and string orchestra, op.87 (1976)
- Concerto No.3 for violin and orchestra, op.115 (1990)

Chamber music

- Elegisch Lied for viola and piano, op.7 (1944)
- Trio for oboe, clarinet and bassoon, op.11 (1942)
- Sonata for violin and piano, op.12 (1943)
- Sonata for viola and piano, op.13 (1943)
- Quartet for 4 flutes, op.14 (1943)
- Quartet for 4 cellos (1944)
- Sextet for wind quintet and piano, op.19 (1945)
- Sonata for cello and piano, op.20 (1945)
- String Quartet No.2, op.28 (1947)
- Musique de midi (Middagmuziek; Midday Music) for flute, clarinet, horn, bassoon, 2 violins, viola, cello and double bass, op.33 (1948)
- Sonata for clarinet and piano, op.40 no.3 (1952)
- Sonata for trumpet and piano, op.40 no.6 (1953)
- Sérénade for 2 violins and piano, op.44 no.1 (1954)
- Sérénade for flute, violin and cello, op.44 no.3 (1957)
- Burlesque for violin and piano, op.48 (1956)
- String Quartet No.3, op.50 (1955)
- Poème d'été (Poem of Summer) for violin and piano, op.51 no.1 (1957)
- Poème du printemps (Poem of Spring) for viola and piano, op.51 no.2 (1958)
- Cinq miniatures (5 Miniatures) for 4 saxophones, op.54 (1958)
- Trio for flute, viola and guitar, op.55 (1959)
- String Quartet No.4, op.56 (1963)
- Wind Quintet, op.58 (1961)
- Cinq Pièces (5 Pieces) for guitar, op.62 (1964)
- Piano Quartet (1973)
- Kamermuziek (Chamber Music) for violin, cello and piano, op.81 no.2 (1973)
- Kamermuziek (Chamber Music) for violin, viola and cello, op.81 no.3 (1973)
- Ballade No.1 for violin and piano, op.86 no.1 (1975)
- Ballade No.2 for viola and piano, op.86 no.2 (1975)
- Ballade No.3 for cello and piano, op.86 no.3 (1975)
- Ballade No.4 for double bass and piano, op.86 no.4 (1975)
- Parades I for 4 clarinets (1977)
- Parades II for 6 saxophones (1978)
- String Trio (1979)
- Intermezzo for guitar, op.96 no.2 (1980)
- Parades III for 4 horns (1981)
- Duo for violin and cello (1983)
- Caractères for viola and guitar, op.106 (1985)
- Deux pièces (2 Pieces) for accordion, op.109 (1986)
- String Quartet No.5, op.116 (1990)
- Mélodie for trumpet or trombone and piano, op.117 (1990)
- Vier Miniaturen (4 Miniatures) for viola solo, op.118 no.1 (1991)
- Romance for violin and piano, op.120 (1991)
- Drie meisjes (Three Maidens), Sonata for violin and piano, op.122 (1993)
- Sonata for violin solo, op.123 (1994)
- Mouvement for string quartet (1994)

Harpsichord

- Suite in re, op.108 (1986)

Organ

- Sonata, op.35 (1949)

Piano

- Sonata, op.23 (1946)
- Cinq portraits (5 Portraits) op.46 (1954)
- La farce des deux nues, op.59 (1963)
- Muziek voor twee piano's (Music for 2 Pianos), op.68 (1966)
- Brindilles, 18 Little Pieces, op.80 (1974)
- Sonata No.2 in D♭, op.84 no.1 (1974)
- Sonata No.3, op.84 no.2 (1977)
- Sonata No.4, op.107 (1985)

Choral

- De gevallen vriend for mixed double chorus a cappella, op.37 (1951); words by Jos De Haes
- La Terra e la morte for soprano solo and female chorus, op.83 (1974); words by Cesare Pavese

Vocal

- Cinq mélodies françaises for alto and piano, op.15 (1944)
- Paradise Regained for medium voice and string quartet (1946)
- Het gevecht met het hart for tenor and piano, op.32 (1948); words by Marcel Coole
- Cantique spirituel for 4 female voices and piano, op.36 (1950); words by René Ménard
- Sept haï-kaï de Kyo Murakami (7 Haikai of Kyo Murakami) for soprano and string quartet, op.38 (1951); words by Kyo Murakami
- Migration des âmes for medium voice and piano, op.45 (1954); words by Armand Bernier
- Brieven uit Portugal (Letters from Portugal) for medium voice and piano, op.47 (1955); words by Hubert van Herreweghen
- Een lied der blijdschap (A Song of Exhilaration) for voice and piano, op.50 (1956); words by Bert Decorte
- Zeng for voice and string quartet (or piano), op.63 (1965); words by Jos Vandeloo
- Mijn gegeven woord for mezzo-soprano and piano (1975)
- Twee Alice Nahon-liederen (2 Alice Nahon Songs) for soprano and piano (1984); words by Alice Nahon
- Björn for medium voice and string quartet, op.124 (1994); words by Björn Van Hauwermeiren

== Sources ==
- Joris de Henau (2002). "CeBeDeM - LEGLEY, Vic". CeBeDeM. Archived from the original on 19 August 2014. Contains a partial worklist.
- Koninklijk Conservatorium Brussel now houses most works and manuscripts of Legley, after the bankruptcy of CeBeDeM in 2015.
