= De Lage Landen =

De Lage Landen is the Dutch term for The Low Countries, but sometimes used restrictively for the Dutch-speaking parts of the Low Countries (the Flemish Region and the Netherlands combined).

It is also used:

- as the title of a periodical published by the cultural foundation Ons Erfdeel
- as the original name of DLL Group
