= Maele =

Maele or Mæle or Máele or Maële is a surname. Notable people with the surname include:

- Bran ua Máele Dúin
- Cellach mac Máele Coba
- Fergal mac Máele Dúin (died 722), High King of Ireland
- Fiannamail mac Máele Tuile
- Govinda Van Maele, Luxembourgish film director
- Harald Mæle
- Máel Dúin mac Máele Fithrich, Irish king, 7th century
- Marcel van Maele, Belgian playwright and sculptor
- Martin van Maële (1863–1926), French illustrator
- Túathal mac Máele-Brigte, King of Leinster
