= Tahliah Street (Jeddah) =

Street in Jeddah, Saudi Arabia

Coordinates: 21°33′11″N 39°9′51″E

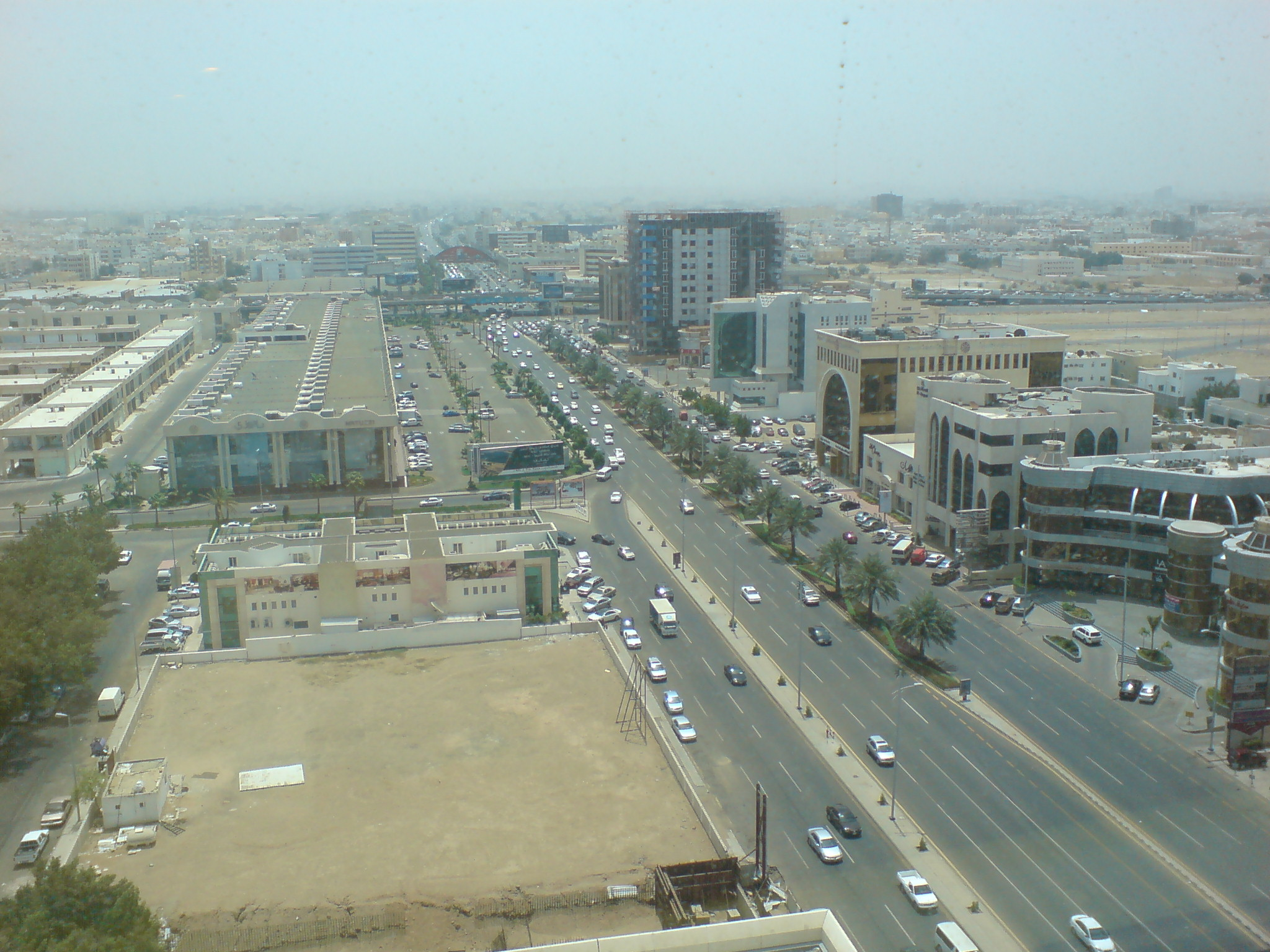
Tahlia Street viewed from Bin Homraan Tower

Tahlia Street (Arabic: شارع التحلية) (also called Prince Mohammed bin Abdulaziz Street) is a fashion and shopping street in the mid-town of Jeddah, Saudi Arabia.

The street contains many upscale department shops, and boutiques, such as Prada, Gucci, Versace, Cartier, Chanel, Louis Vuitton, Dolce & Gabbana, Ralph Lauren and Giorgio Armani. As the Champs-Élysées is for Paris, Tahlia Street is believed to be the heart of Jeddah and Saudi Arabia's wealthiest district.

In 1981, Mayor Mohammed Said Farsi wanted to place a monumental statue on Tahlia Street. He asked the Belgian artist Hubert Minnebo to make a 15 meter high copper statue. Since 1982 the statue 'Hope for the right path' has been on the Sword Roundabout.

This commercial street is the destination of soccer fans, who drive up and down waving club scarves and sounding their car horns to celebrate victory.

An identically named street in Saudi Arabia's capital Riyadh, Prince Mohammed bin Abdulaziz Street, has been nicknamed Tahlia Street by the residents as it coincidentally shares many similarities with the original Tahlia Street in Jeddah.

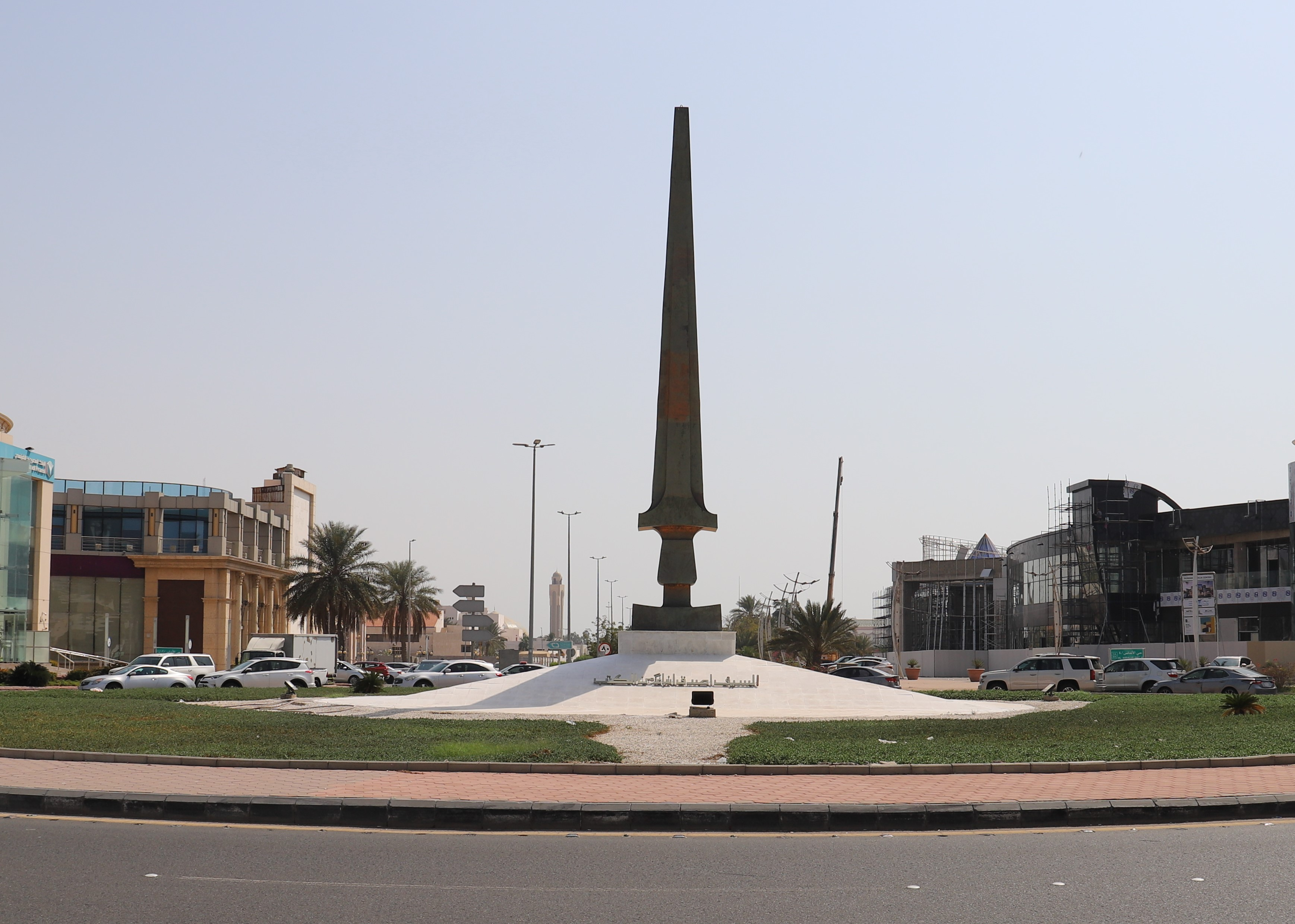
Copper statue 'Hope for the right path' from Belgian artist Hubert Minnebo

== Gallery ==
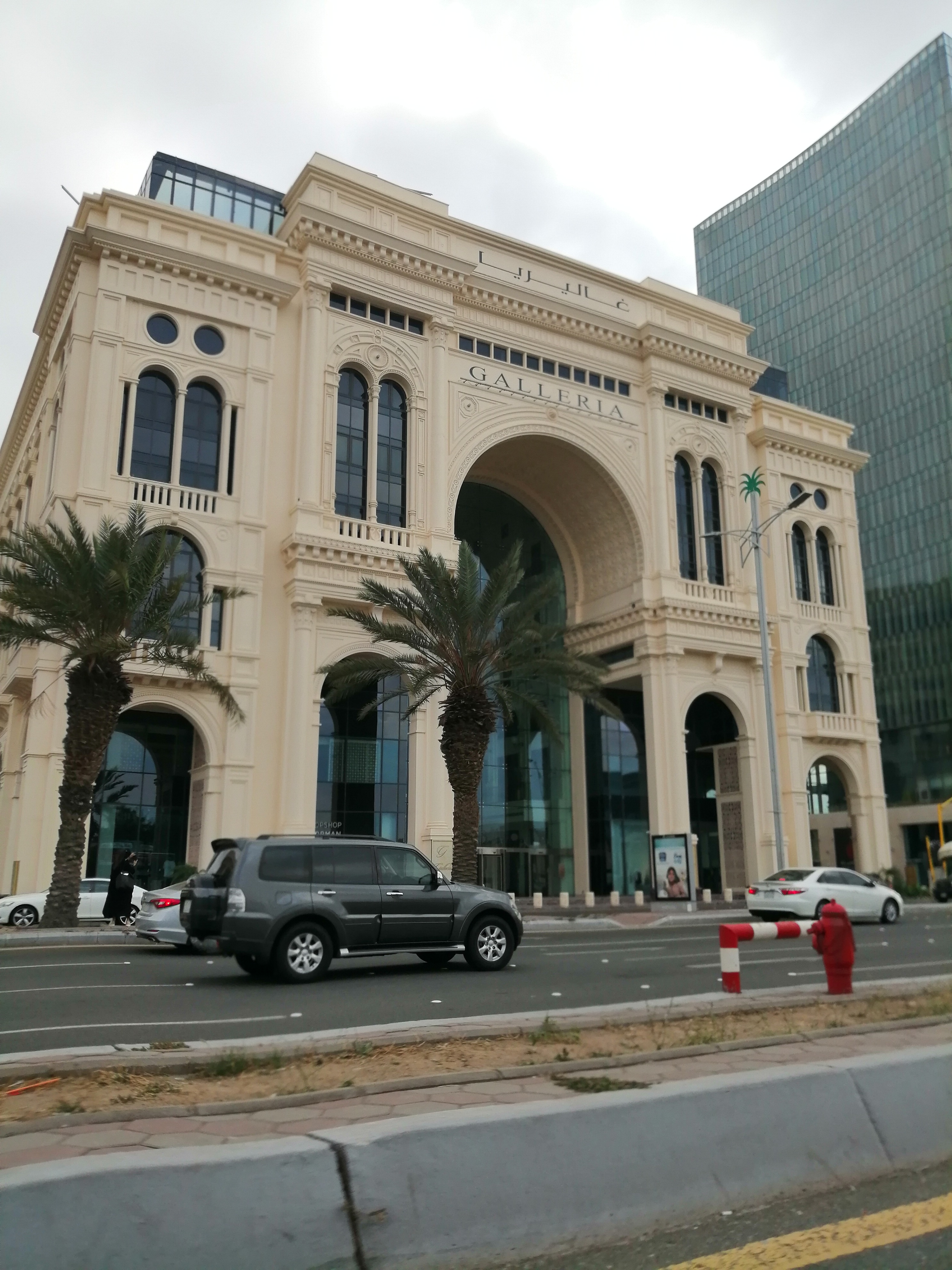
Jeddah's Galleria in Tahlia Street

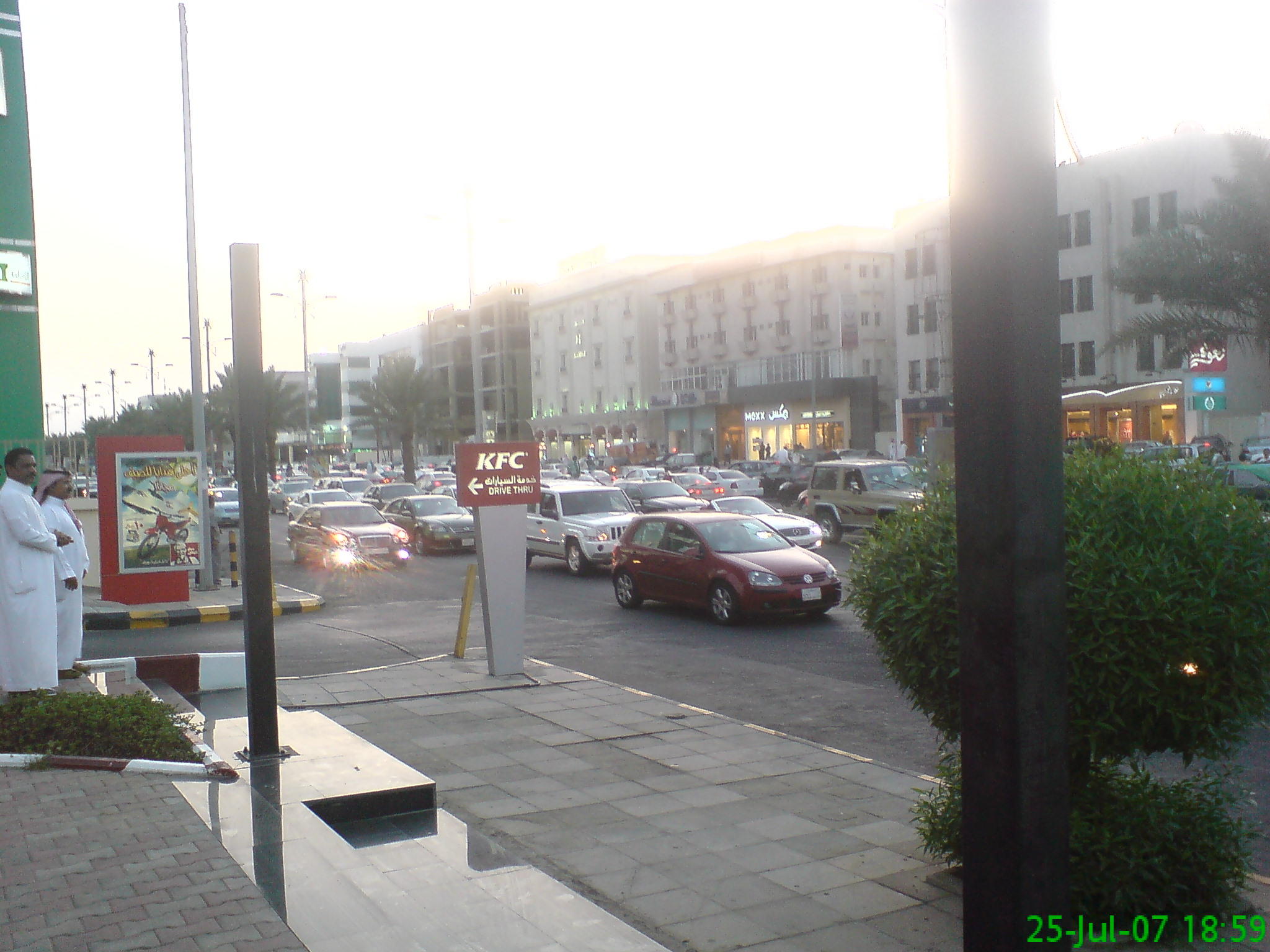
Tahlia Street in 2007 following the Saudi/Japan AFC Asian Cup match

== See also ==
- Transport in Saudi Arabia
