= Lucienne Stassaert =

Belgian poet (1936–2026)

- Born: 10 January 1936; Antwerp, Belgium
- Died: 7 August 2026 (aged 90); Antwerp, Belgium
- Occupation: Poet
- Spouse: Wybrand Ganzevoort (1930-2022)
- Children: Régine Ganzevoort (1961), Anouk Ganzevoort (1963)

Lucienne Stassaert (10 January 1936 – 7 August 2026) was a Belgian poet.

Stassaert died on 7 August 2026, at the age of 90.

== Bibliography (selection) ==
- Verhalen van de jonkvrouw met de spade (1965)
- Bongobloesembloed (with Max Kazan) (1966)
- Fossiel (1969)
- Het dagelijks feest (1970)
- De houtworm (1970)
- Het Stenenrijk (1973)
- In de klok van de machine tikt een mens (1973)
- De blauwe uniformen (1974)
- Vergeten grens (1974)
- Een kleine zeeanemoon (1975)
- Best mogelijk (1975)
- Elixir d’Anvers (1976)
- De sprekende gelijkenis (The Strong Resemblance) (1978)
- Rui (Moulting) (1986)
- Naar Emily (To Emily) (1992)
- Blind vuur (Blind Fire) (1995)
- Tussen water en wind (’Twixt Water and Wind) (1998)
- Afscheidsliedjes (Songs of Farewell) (2001)
- Als later dan nog bestaat (As later than still exists) (2003)
- In aanraking (In Touch) (2004)
- Het vlas komt in de blomme (The Flax Comes into Flower) (2006)
- In de laai van het vuur (In the Blaze of the Fire) (2007)

== Awards ==
- 1974 – De Vlaamse Gids Poetry prize for the poetry collection ‘Vergeten grens’
- 1975 – Visser-Neerlandiaprijs for the play ‘Best mogelijk’
- 1977 – Vlaamse Poëziedagen Poetry prize for the poetry collection ‘De sprekende gelijkenis’
- 1980 – Arkprijs van het Vrije Woord for the novel ‘Parfait Amour’
- 1994 – Provinciale Prijs voor Letterkunde van de stad Antwerpen for the poetry collection ‘Naar Emily’
- 2008 – Dr. Ferdinand Snellaertprijs for ‘In de laai van het vuur’.

== See also ==
- Flemish literature

== Sources ==
- Michiel van Kempen, 'Bespreking van De lichtvoetige amazone: Het geheime leven van Aphra Behn' in: Oso, Tijdschrift voor Surinaamse taalkunde, letterkunde en geschiedenis, 21 (2002), nr. 1, mei, pp. 162–163.
