= Eddy van Vliet =

Belgian writer and lawyer (1942-2002)

Eduard Léon Juliaan van Vliet (11 September 1942 in Antwerp – 5 October 2002 in Roeselare) was a Belgian writer and lawyer. He graduated in law at the Vrije Universiteit Brussel. The fact that his father left his family, played an important role in his poetry.

== Bibliography ==
- Het lied van ik (1964)
- Duel (1967)
- Columbus tevergeefs (1969)
- Van bittere tranen, kollebloemen e.a. blozende droefheden (1971)
- De vierschaar (1973)
- Het grote verdriet (1974)
- Na de wetten van Afscheid & Herfst (1978)
- Poëzie is een daad van bevestiging (1978)
- Glazen (1979)
- Is dit genoeg: een stuk of wat gedichten (1982)
- Jaren na maart (1983)
- De binnenplaats (1987)
- De toekomstige dief (1991)
- Poëzie (1991)
- Een lekker hapje voor Winston (1996)
- Zoals in een fresco de kleur (1996)
- Vader (2001)

== Awards ==
- 1971 - Arkprijs van het Vrije Woord
- 1975 - Jan Campertprijs

== See also ==
- Flemish literature

== Sources ==
- Eddy Van Vliet (in Dutch)
- Bartosik, Michel, Eddy van Vliet. In: Kritisch lexikon van de Nederlandstalige literatuur na 1945 (1989).
- Willem M. Roggeman, Eddy van Vliet In: Beroepsgeheim 4 (1983)
