= Leo Apostel =

Belgian philosopher and professor (1925–1995)

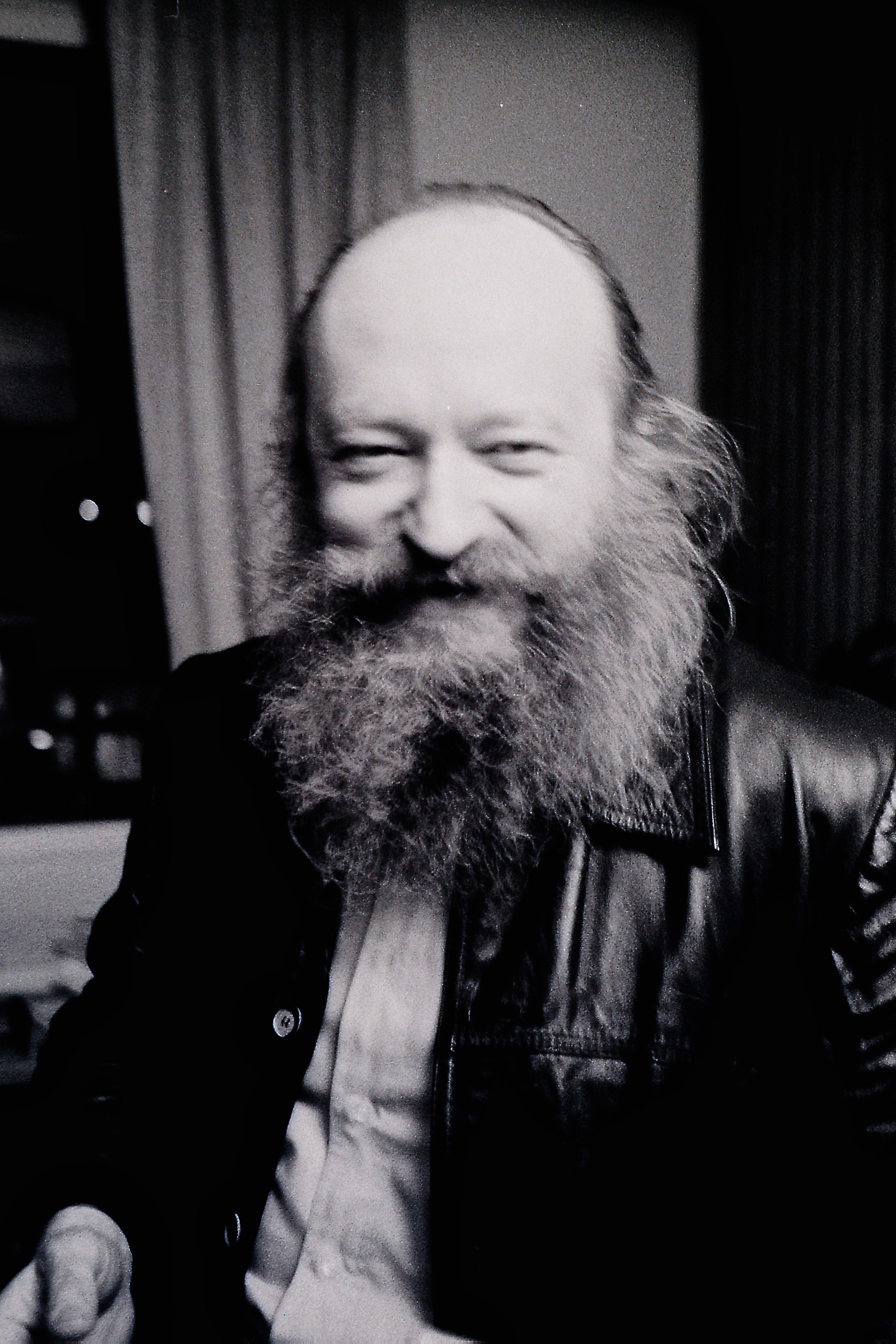
- Born: 4 September 1925; Antwerp, Belgium
- Died: 10 August 1995 (aged 69); Ghent, Belgium

Academic background
- Education: Université libre de Bruxelles
- Thesis: La Loi et les Causes

Academic work
- Discipline: philosophy
- Institutions: Vrije Universiteit Brussel; Ghent University

Leo Apostel (Antwerp, 4 September 1925 – Ghent, 10 August 1995) was a Belgian philosopher and professor at the Vrije Universiteit Brussel and Ghent University. Apostel was an advocate of interdisciplinary research and the bridging of the gap between exact science and humanities.

== Biography ==
Leo Apostel was born Antwerp, Belgium, in 1925. After the second World War he studied philosophy at the ULB in Brussels with philosopher of law and logician Chaïm Perelman. He got his M.A. at the ULB in Brussels in October 1948 with the thesis Questions sur l'Introspection. For another year he stayed there working as an assistant of Perelman.

In 1950-1951 Apostel was a CRB fellow at the University of Chicago with Rudolf Carnap, and with Carl Hempel at Yale University. He took his Ph.D. at the ULB in March 1953 with the dissertation "La Loi et les Causes". In 1955 he went to Geneva, Switzerland, to study with Jean Piaget at the Centre International d'Epistémologie Génétique. These experiences would influence him for the rest of his life.

From 1955 Apostel lectured logic and philosophy of science at the Ghent University and the ULB for three years. In 1958-1959 he was visiting professor at the Pennsylvania State University, and from 1960 to 1979 professor at Ghent University.

Leo Apostel was awarded the Solvay award for human sciences in 1985 and the Arkprijs van het Vrije Woord in 1986. The transdisciplinary research department Center Leo Apostel (CLEA) at the Vrije Universiteit Brussel was named after him.

Apostel died at the age of 69 on August 10, 1995.

== Work ==
Apostel was an advocate of interdisciplinary research and the bridging of the gap between exact science and humanities.

In his book "Oorsprong" (Origin) from 2000 Apostel gives a metaphysical introduction about the beginning of Man, life and the Universe. This work is part of his project to develop his own scientific metaphysics. The basis for this is the contemporary philosophy of science and humanities and the existing sciences from physics, astrophysics, biology, geology and anthropology. In this book he first outlines the term metaphysics, then presents an ontology, which results in his own attempt at a consistent world view.

Apostel wrote two books about Freemasonry: Freemasonry: A Philosophical Essay in 1985, and Atheïstische spiritualiteit in 1998. in which he promoted his ideas of an atheistic spirituality.

== Literature ==
Apostel wrote about 20 books and 100 articles in Dutch, French and English. Some of his books:

- 1959, Logika en geesteswetenschappen, Bruges
- 1964, De humanismen en het humanisme, Antwerp
- 1966, Pluralisme en verdraagzaamheid, Antwerp (with Marcel Bots)
- 1974, Matière et Forme, Ghent
- 1975, Formele logika. 1. Klassieke systemen, Kapellen
- 1977, Déterminants sociologiques de la méthodologie scientifique, Marseille
- 1978, Pedagogiek, logica en actietheorie, Leuven
- 1979, Communication et Action, Ghent
- 1979, Logique et Dialectique, Ghent
- 1980, Theory of knowledge and science policy, Ghent
- 1981, African Philosophy : myth or reality?, Ghent
- 1982, Mysticism, ritual and atheism, in Religious atheism?, Ghent
- 1984, Afbraak en Opbouw, VUB Press, Brussels
- 1985, Freemasonry: A Philosophical Essay, VUB Press, Brussels
- 1990, Atheïstische spiritualiteit, School voor comparatieve filosofie, Ghent
- 1991, Wereldbeelden: van fragmentering naar integratie, Kapellen (with Jan Van der Veken)
- 1992, De Gebroken Orde, Kritak, Leuven
- 1992, Vrijmetselarij. Een wijsgerige benadering, Hadewijch, Antwerp
- 1993, Waarde en Zin van de Cultuurwetenschappen in de 20e eeuw, Pelckmans, Kapellen
- 1994, Wereldbeelden: ontologie en ethiek, DNB Pelckmans, Antwerp
- 1997, Hopeloos gelukkig, Meulenhoff Kritak, Amsterdam (with Jenny Walry & Bart Keunen)
- 1998, Atheïstische spiritualiteit, VUB Press, Brussels
- 2000, Oorsprong: inleiding tot een metafysica van het ontstaan van mens, leven en heelal, VUB Press, Brussels
- 2000, Levend sterven, VUB Press, Brussels
- 2000, Natuurfilosofie: voorbereidend werk voor een op de fysica gebaseerde ontologie, VUB Press, Brussels
- 2002, Wereldbeelden en ethische stelsels, VUB Press, Brussels
- 2002, Zoektocht naar eenheid verscheidenheid: 6 opstellen over metafysica, VUB Press, Brussels

=== About Leo Apostel ===
- Ingrid Van Dooren and Leo Apostel, The Philosophy of Leo Apostel: A life history Communication and Cognition, 1989.

== See also ==
- Center Leo Apostel for Interdisciplinary Studies
- World view
