= Frans De Bruyn =

Flemish writer

Frans Juliaan Corneel De Bruyn (born in Boom, 10 May 1924 – 29 October 2014) was a Flemish writer. De Bruyn was born in Boom, Belgium, in 1924.

== Bibliography ==
- Tekens in steen (1955)
- De regen schuilt in ons (1956)
- Die hemel is ons huis (1958)
- De zeven heuvelen van Rome (1961)
- Een hobbelpaard voor Hansje (1962)
- Elke vrijdag vis (1963)
- De holbewoners (1965)
- The literary genres of Edmund Burke (1996)
- Mensen in het circus

== Awards ==
- 1956 - Arkprijs van het Vrije Woord

== See also ==
- Flemish literature

== Sources ==
- Frans De Bruyn
- Frans De Bruyn
- G.J. van Bork en P.J. Verkruijsse, De Nederlandse en Vlaamse auteurs (1985)
