= Roger M.J. De Neef =

Flemish writer and poet

Roger M.J. De Neef (Wemmel, 24 June 1941) is a Flemish writer and poet.

== Bibliography ==
- Winterrunen (1967)
- Lichaam mijn landing (1970)
- De grote wolk (1972)
- Gestorven getal (1977)
- Gedichten van licht en overspel (1982)
- De vertelkunst van de bloemen (1985)
- De halsband van de duif (1993)
- Blues for a reason (1995)
- Empty bed blues (1996)
- De kou van liefde (1999)

== Awards ==
- 1986 - Driejaarlijkse Staatsprijs voor Poëzie
- 1987 - Arkprijs van het Vrije Woord

== See also ==
- Flemish literature

== Sources ==
- Roger M.J. De Neef
- G.J. van Bork en P.J. Verkruijsse, De Nederlandse en Vlaamse auteurs (1985)
