= Astère M. Dhondt =

Flemish writer

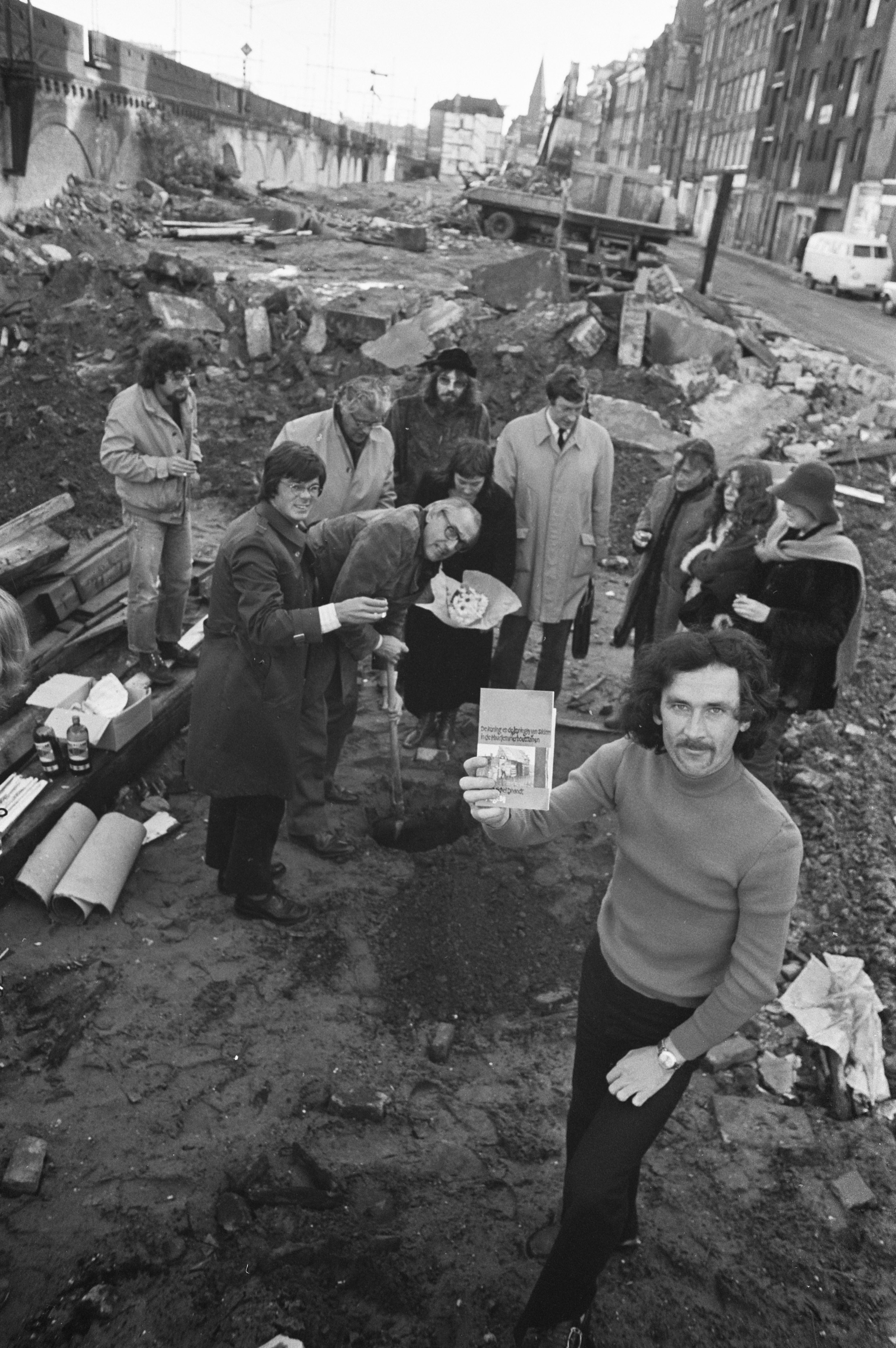

Astère Michel Dhondt (born 12 October 1937) is a Flemish writer.

== Bibliography ==
- God in Vlaanderen, 1965.
- Zeven geestige knaapjes, 1966.
- De wilde jacht. Amsterdam, 1968.
- Gezangen en gebeden. Een selektie 1965–68, 1969.
- De Koning en de Koningin van Sikkem in de Haarlemmerhouttuinen. Gedichten, Spelen, Brieven 1968–1971, 1971.
- Sinbad de Zeeroverj, 1973.
- De brieven van de troubadour, 1975.
- De vruchten van het veld, 1977.
- De lieverdjes van Amsterdam, gefotografeerd door Astère Michel Dhondt 1968–69. St. Odiliënberg, Corrie Zelen, 1977.

== Awards ==
- 1966 - Arkprijs van het Vrije Woord

== Sources ==
- "Astère M. Dhondt". DNBL.org.
