= Georges Hebbelinck =

Georges Hebbelinck (Ghent, 4 March 1916 – Ghent, 3 October 1964) was a Flemish writer.

== Bibliography ==
- Kroesbal uit het Zoniënwoud (1957)
- Het meisje in de kelder (1958)
- De rozen van Kazanlik (1959)
- De journalist (1960)
- Kent gij de zoo van Antwerpen? (1960)
- De trein reed door het dal (1962)

== Awards ==
- 1962 – Arkprijs van het Vrije Woord

== See also ==
- Flemish literature

== Sources ==
- Georges Hebbelinck (Dutch)
- Georges Hebbelinck (Dutch)
- G.J. van Bork en P.J. Verkruijsse, De Nederlandse en Vlaamse auteurs (1985)
