= Albert Bontridder =

- Albert Marcel Alfons Bontridder
- Born: April 4, 1921; Braine-le-Comte
- Died: December 13, 2015 (aged 94)
- Occupations: poet, architect
- Years active: 1951 – 2015

Albert Bontridder (4 April 1921 – 13 December 2015) was a Belgian architect and writer, born in Anderlecht. In 1953, he married Olga Dohnalova, a Czech refugee, and together they had two children.

He graduated as an architect in 1942. As an architect, he made the plan for the house of his friend Louis Paul Boon. In 1952 he was a founding member and editor of the magazine Architecture in Brussels. He was an editor of the experimental illustrated magazines Tijd en Mens (E: Time and Man) (1949–1955) and Kentering (E: Change) (1966–1977). He published his first poems in French and he made his actual debut with Hoog water (E: high tide) (1951).

== Bibliography ==
- Poésie se brise (poetry, 1951)
- Hoog water (poetry, 1951)
- Dood hout (poetry, 1955)
- Bagatelle – hangende vis (poetry, 1960)
- Jacques Dupuis ou l'architecture perdue et retrouvée (monography, 1961)
- Dialoog tussen licht en stilte (study, 1963)
- Open einde (poetry, 1967)
- De bankreet vader (anthology, 1968)
- Ook de nacht is een zon (poetry, 1969)
- Zelfverbranding (poetry, 1971)
- Gedichten 1942–1972 (1973)
- Voor een waterdruppel (poetry, 1975)
- Vingerknippen naar een vlinder (poetry, 1976)
- Een brug slaan (poetry, 1977)
- Huizen vieren haat (poetry, 1979)
- Gevecht met de rede. Leo Stijnen : leven en werk (essay, 1979)
- Inleiding tot de poëzie van Marcel Wauters (1981)
- Brussel: poëzie over een stad (1981) (and other authors)
- Een oog te veel (poetry, 1984)
- Poésie flamande d' aujoud'hui (essay, 1986)
- Marcel Coole vierde onlangs zijn 80ste verjaardag (article, 1994)
- Versnipperde intenties (poetry, 1997) (and other authors)
- Is de acacia mij bekend (poetry, 1999)

== Awards ==
- 1957 – Arkprijs van het Vrije Woord
- 1960 – Literaire prijs van de provincie Brabant
- 1970 – Dirk Martensprijs
- 1972 – Jan Campertprijs

== See also ==
- Flemish literature

== Sources ==
- Albert Bontridder
- Albert Bontridder
- Willem M. Roggeman, 'Albert Bontridder' In: Beroepsgeheim 1 (1975)
