= Maurice D'Haese =

Maurice D'Haese (7 November 1919, in Lede – 27 April 1981, in Aalst) was a Flemish writer who was awarded the 1953 Ark Prize of the Free Word.

== Bibliography ==
- De heilige gramschap (1952)
- De witte muur (1957)
- Verhalen (1961)

== Awards ==
- 1953 - Arkprijs van het Vrije Woord
- Dirk Martensprijs

== See also ==
- Flemish literature
