= Hubert Minnebo =

Belgian artist (born 1940)

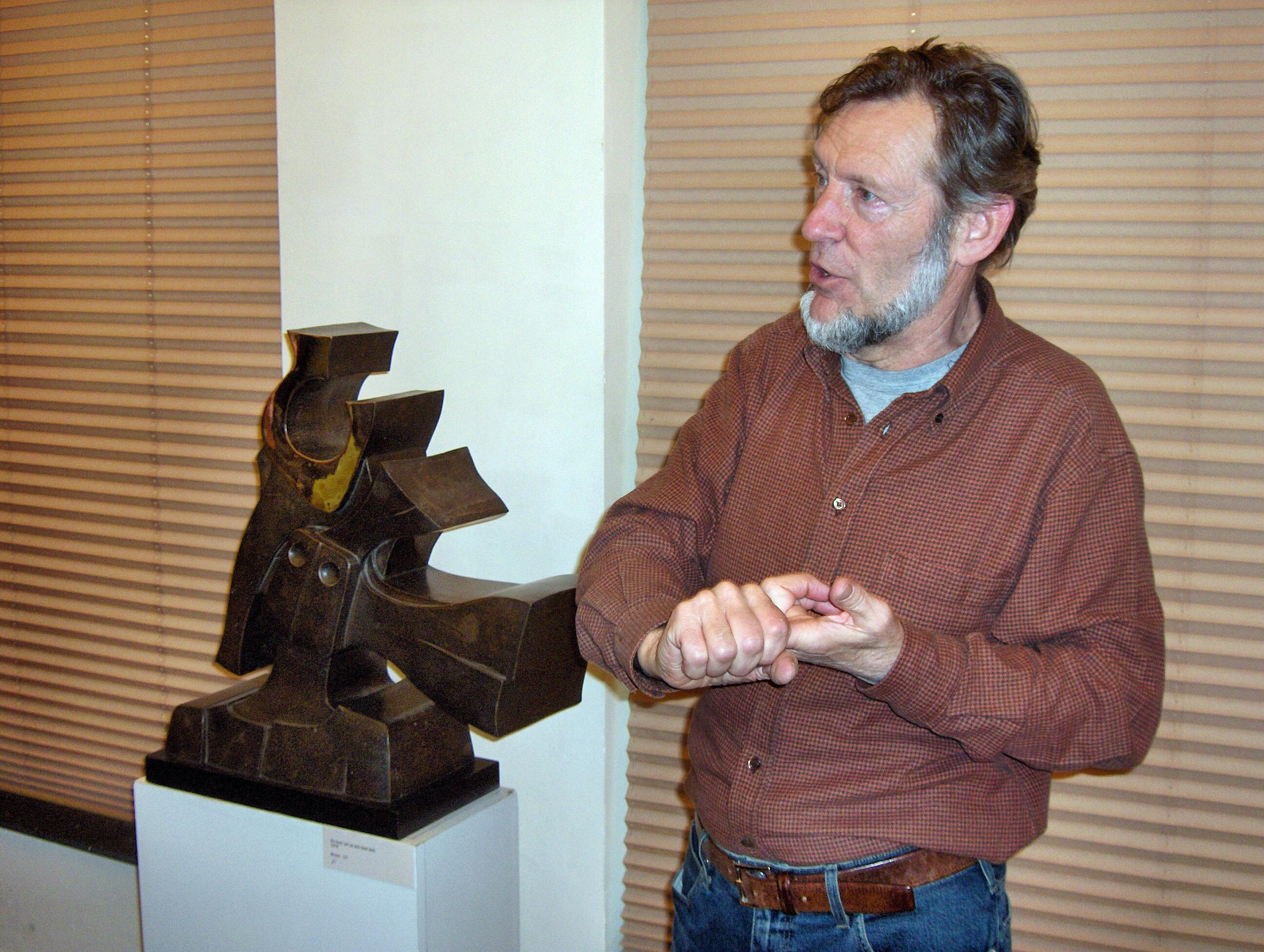
Hubert Minnebo at an exhibition in Ostend, Belgium

Hubert Minnebo (born 6 February 1940) is an artist from Belgium. He is a painter and sculptor who often works with bronze and gold.

Minnebo began his career as a painter. He then gradually shifted to working with aluminium, opting for copper as his material, before eventually working with bronze, silver, and gold. He turned into a sculptor and jewellery designer. Minnebo has also provided the illustrations for several books by Frans Boenders and Winand Callewaert.

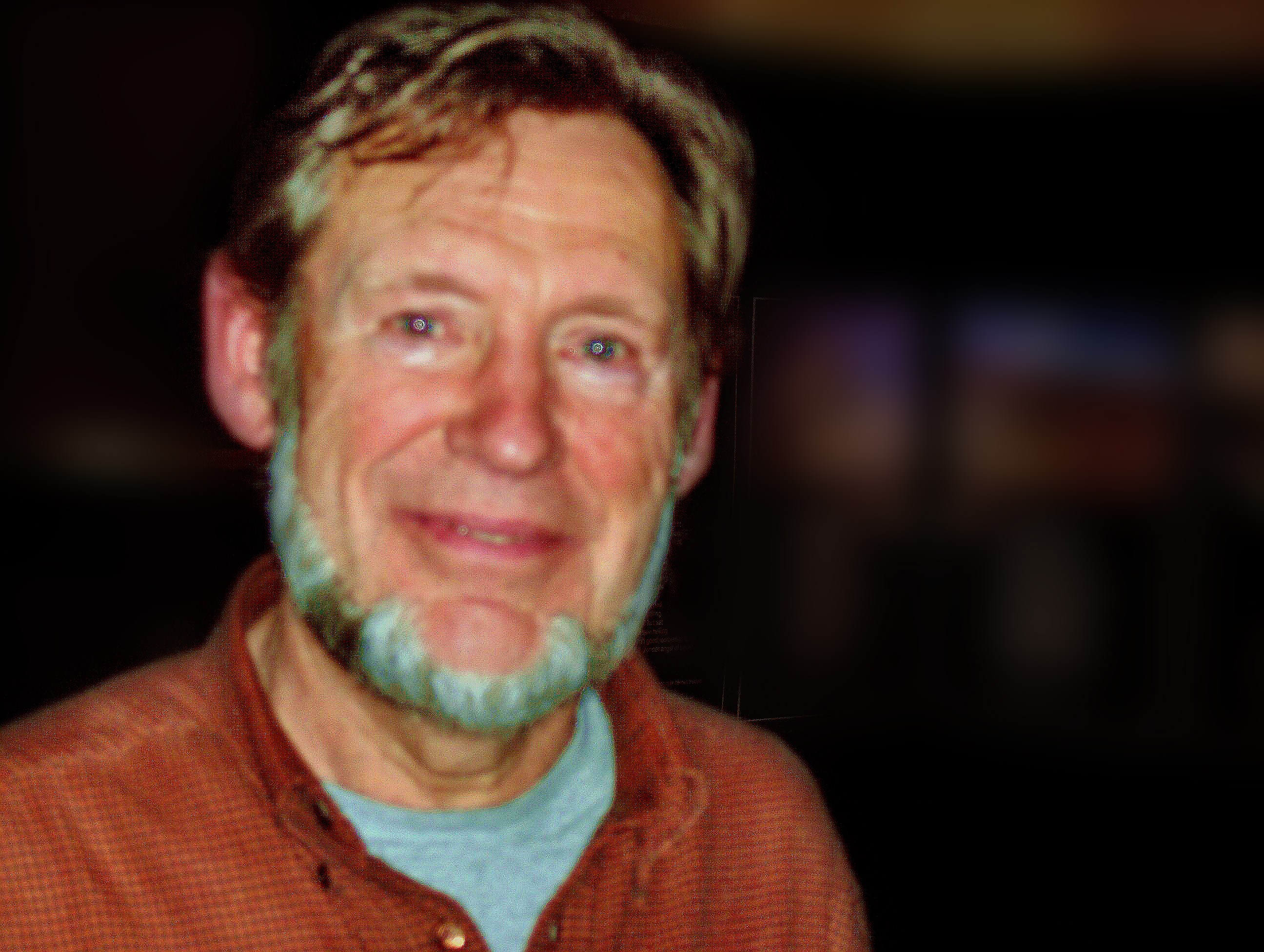
Hubert Minnebo

== Examples of work ==
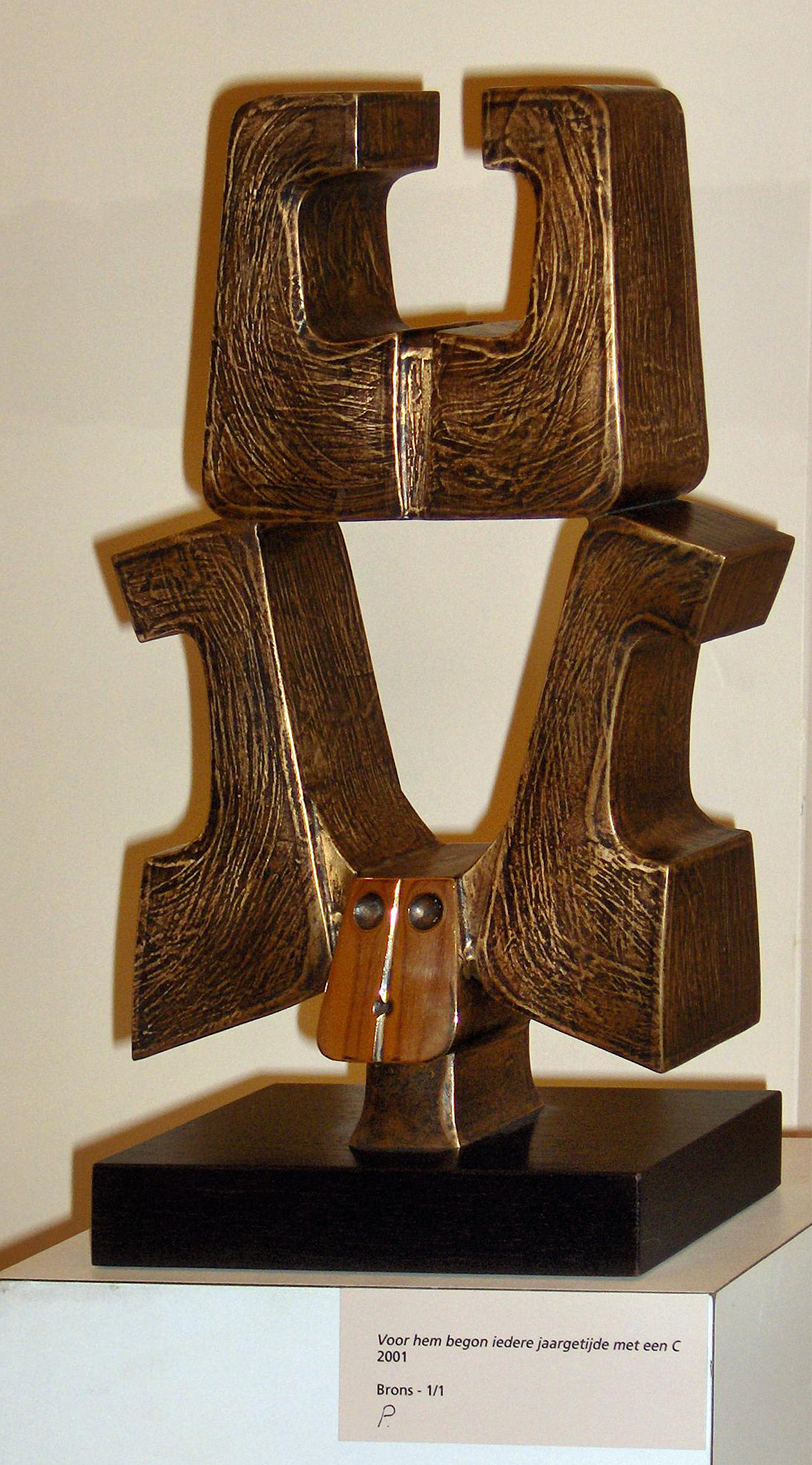

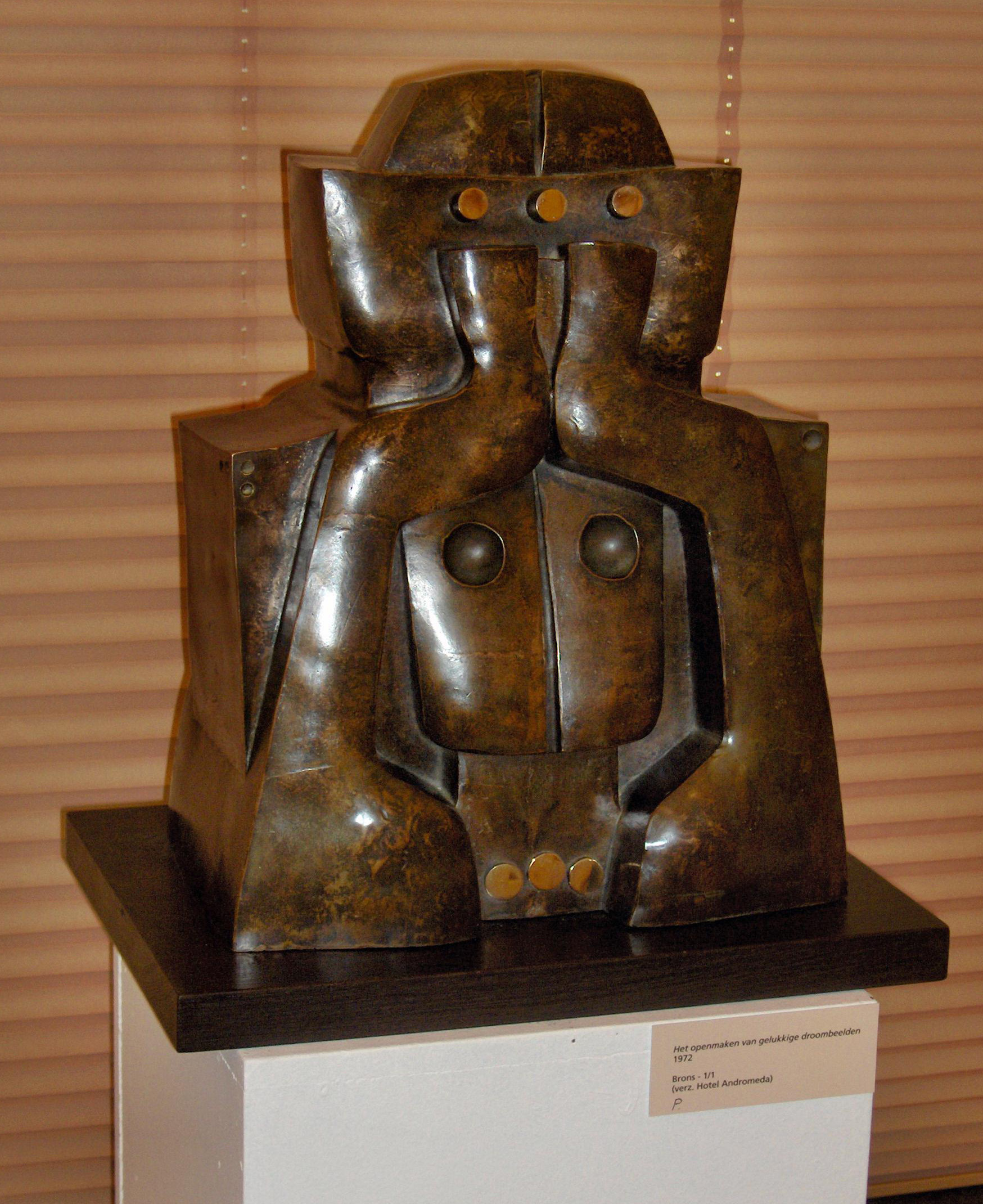

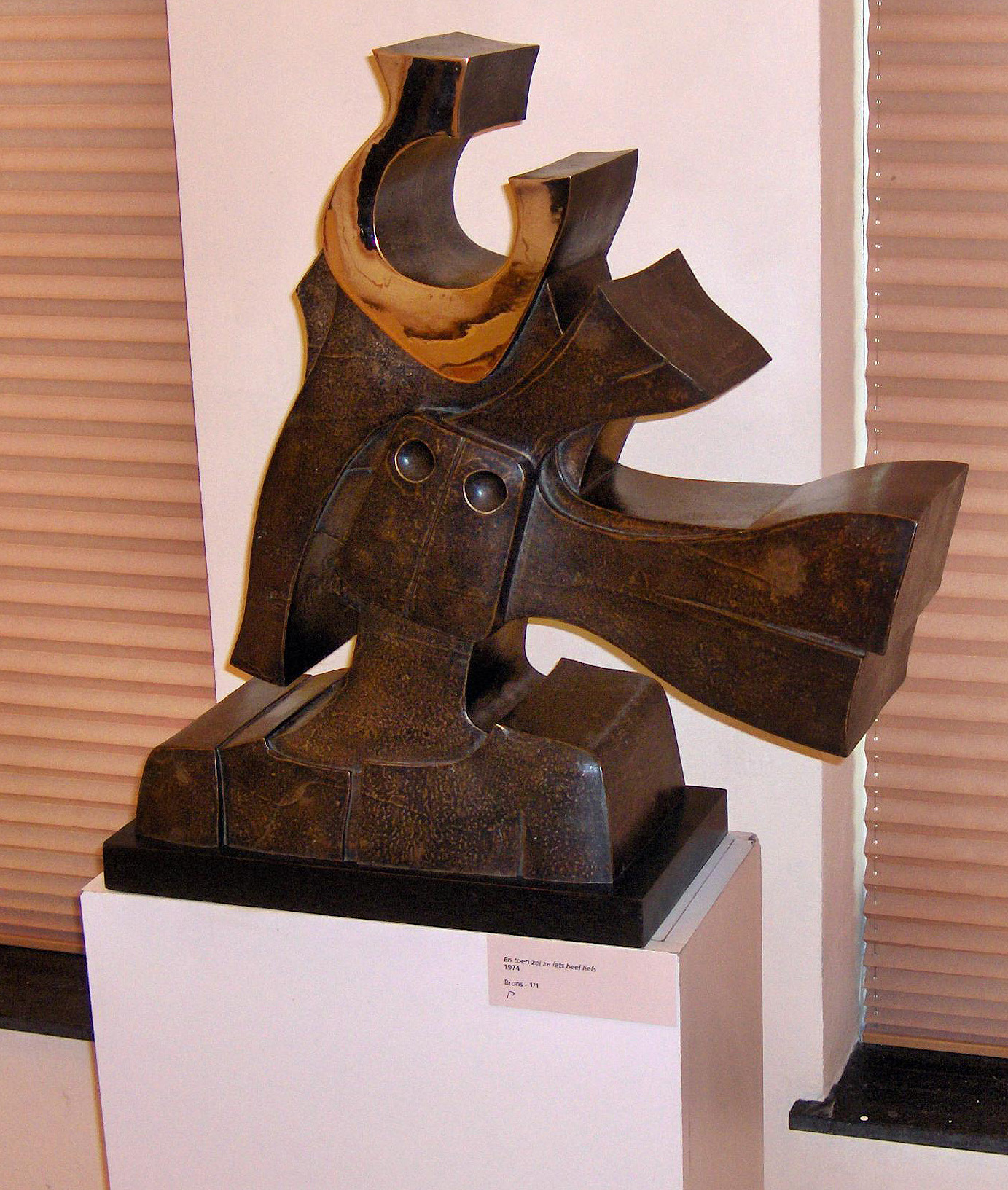

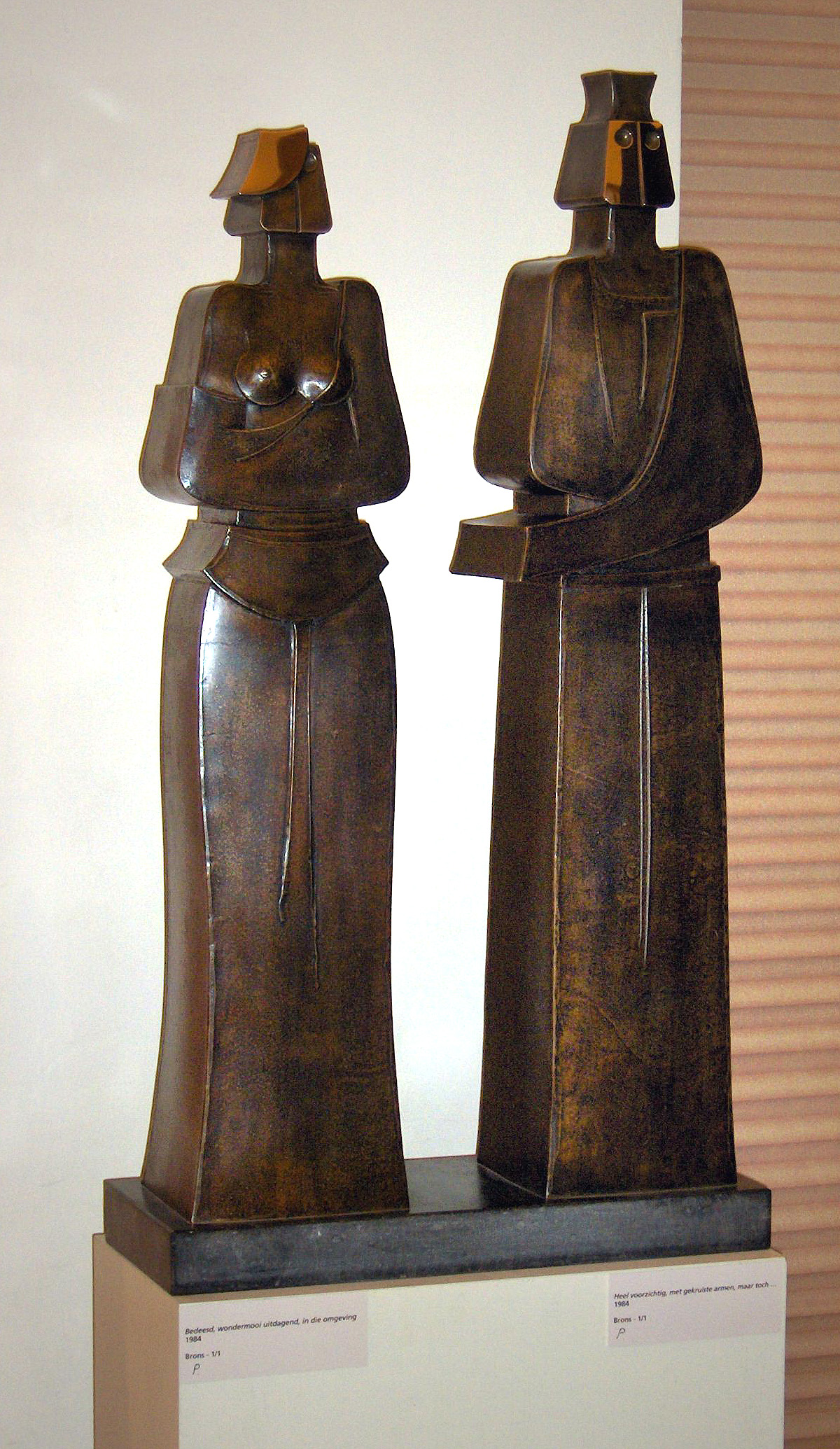

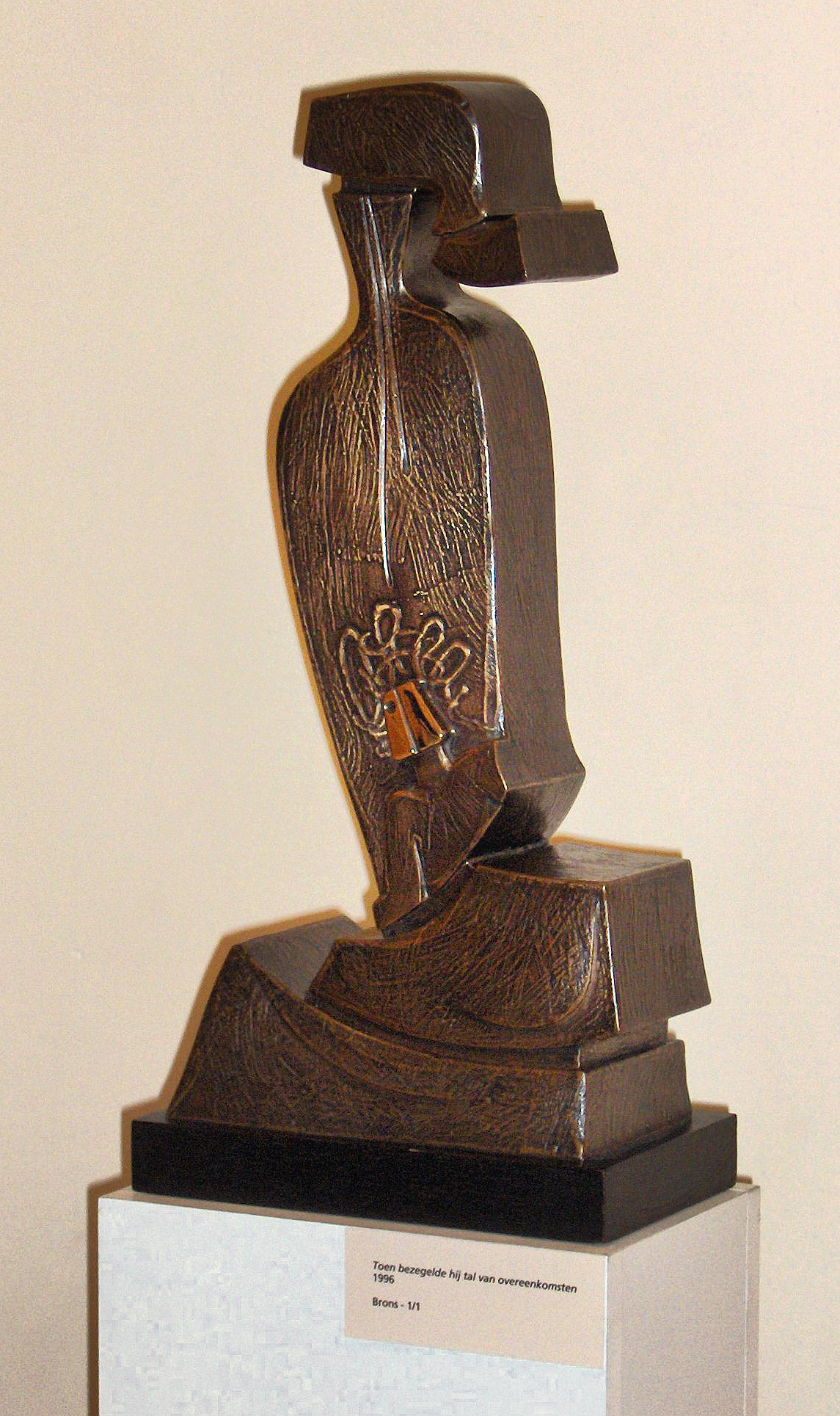

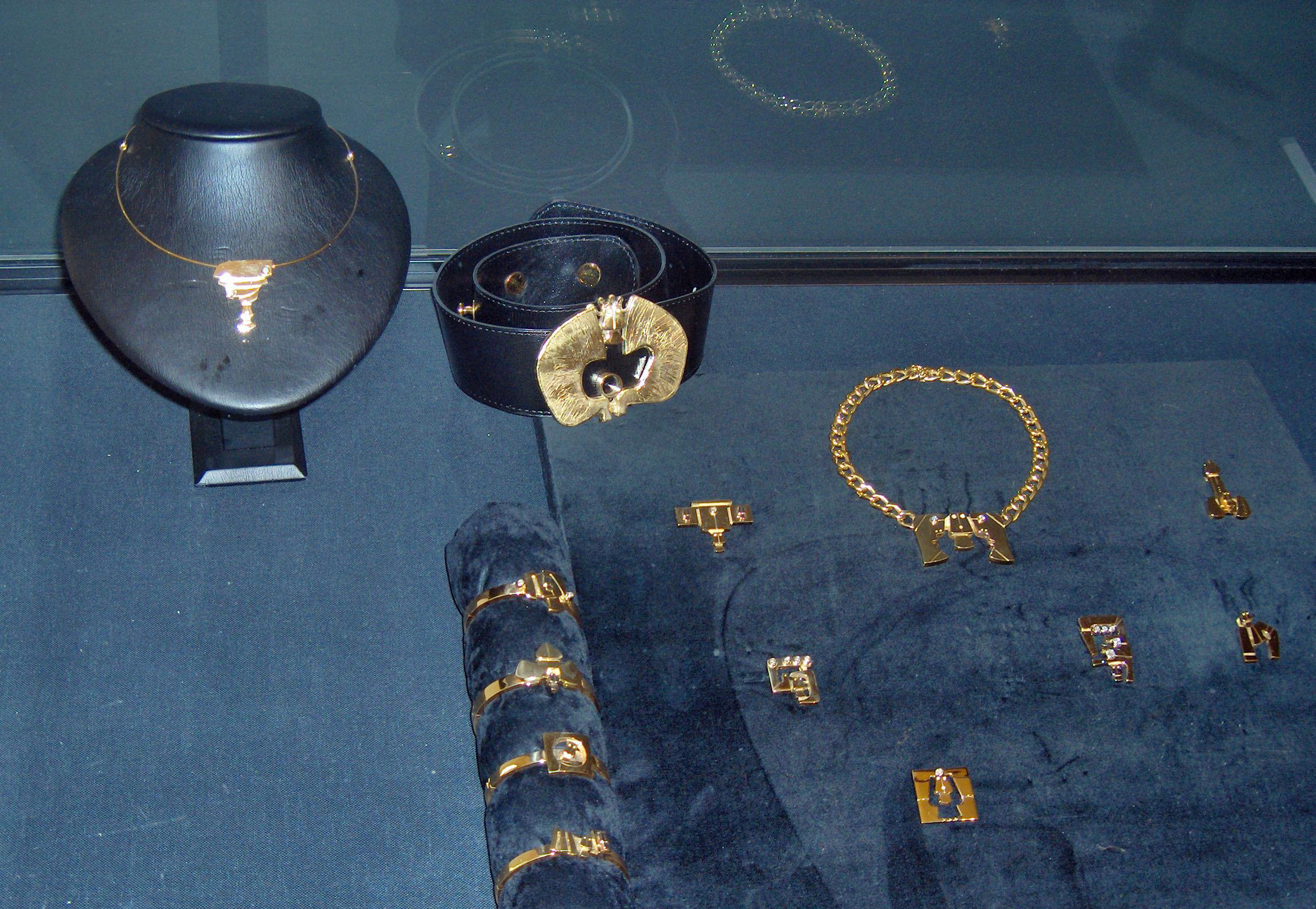

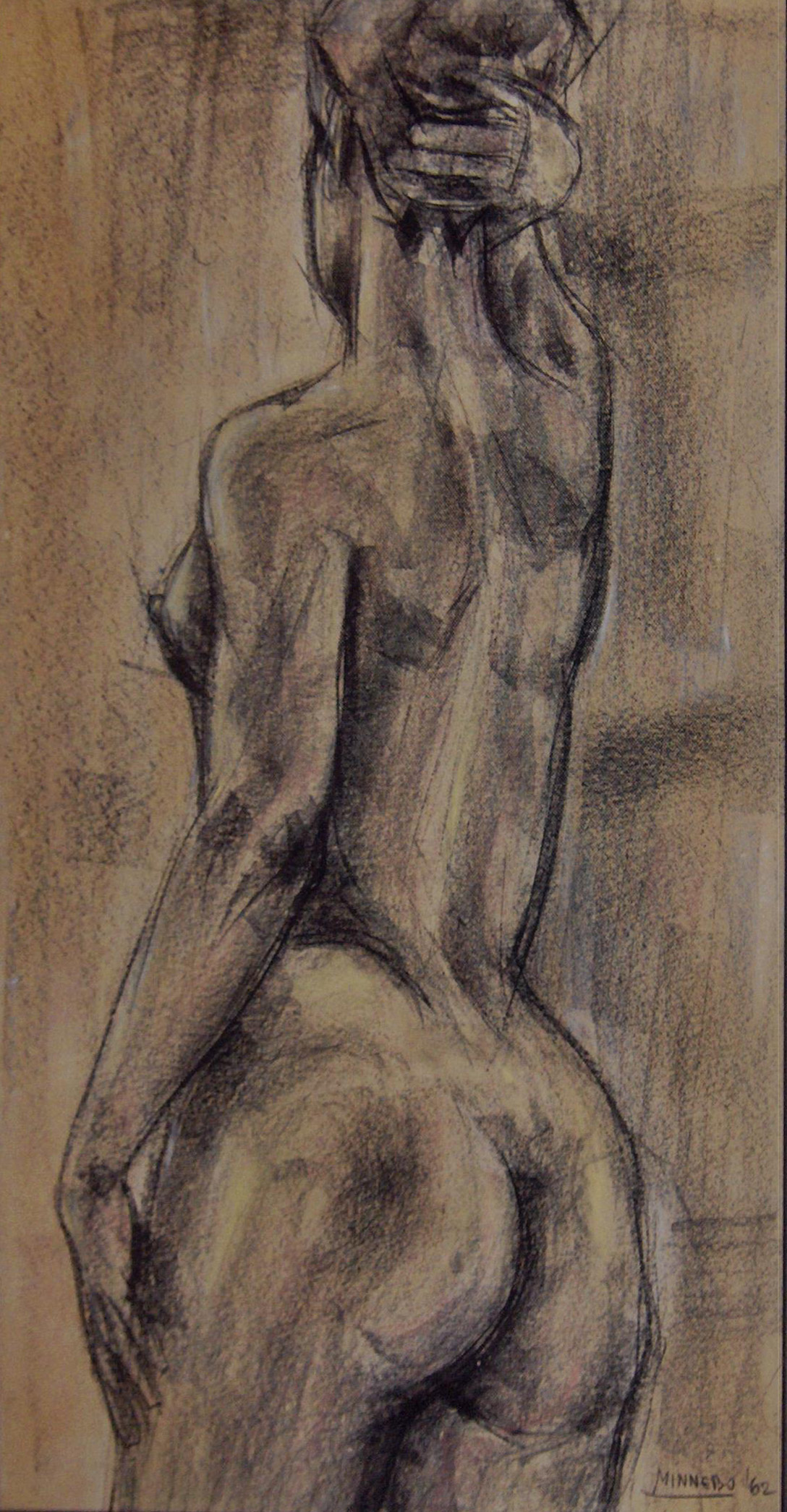

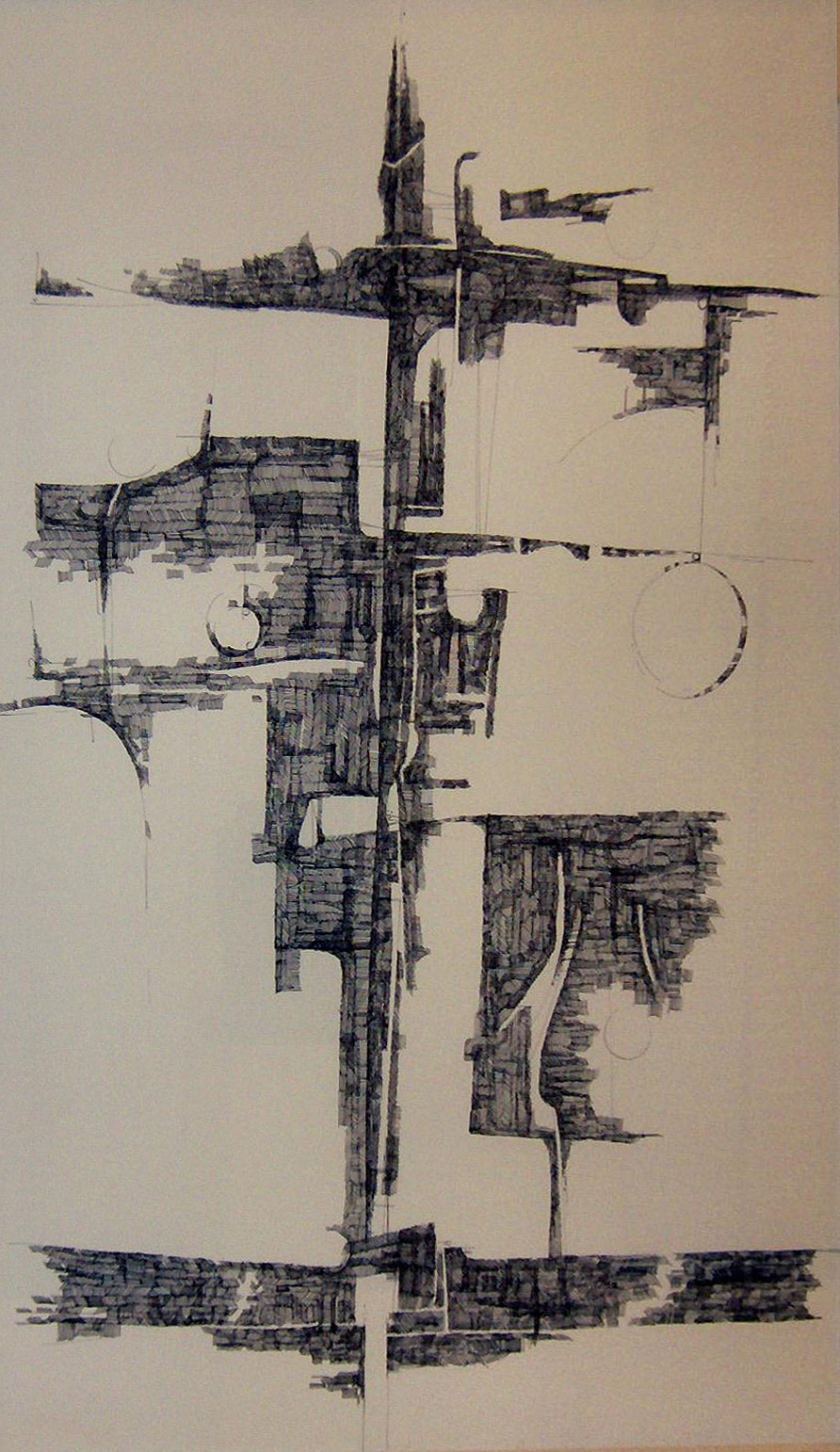
