= Pol Hoste =

Belgian writer

Paul Gustaaf Julia Hoste (born 25 March 1947 in Lokeren), pseudonym Pol Hoste is a Belgian writer. He graduated in Germanic philology at the University of Ghent. He started his career as a teacher of the English and Dutch languages. From 1983 until 1985 he was an editor at Heibel and made contributions to De Morgen, De Nieuwe and the Volkskrant.

== Bibliography ==
- De veranderingen (1979)
- Vrouwelijk enkelvoud (1987)
- Een schoon bestaan (1989)
- Brieven aan Mozart (1991)
- Een schrijver die geen schrijver is (1991)
- Ontroeringen van een forens (1993)
- High key (1995)
- Foto's met de aap (1997)
- De lucht naar Mirabel (1999)
- Montreal (2003)
- Een dag in maart (2006)

== Awards ==
- 1999 - Cultuurprijs van de Stad Gent
- 2002 - Arkprijs van het Vrije Woord

== See also ==
- Flemish literature

== Sources ==
- Pol Hoste (in Dutch)
- H. Vandevoorde, Eenheid en fragment. Het proza van Pol Hoste, Yang 25 (1989)
