= Willy Roggeman =

Belgian writer and jazz musician (1934–2023)

Willy Roggeman (9 June 1934 – 15 April 2023) was a Belgian writer and jazz musician. Born in Ninove on 9 June 1934, he died in Aalst on 15 April 2023, at the age of 88.

== Bibliography ==
- De adem van de jazz (1961)
- Het goudvisje (1962)
- Blues voor glazen blazers (1964)
- Yin/Yang (1964)
- Literair labo (1965)
- Jazzologie 1940-1965 (1966)
- Nardis (1966)
- De axolotl (1967)
- Het zomers nihil (1967)
- Catch as catch can (1968)
- Free en andere jazz-essays (1969)
- De ringen van de kinkhoorn (1970)
- Homoïostase (1971)
- Made of words (1972)
- Indras (1973)
- Gnomon (1975)
- De goddelijke hagedisjes (1978)
- Lithopedia (1979)
- Glazuur op niets (1981)
- Glazuur op niets (1981)
- Postumiteiten (1996)
- De gedichten 1953-2002 (2004)

== Awards ==
- 1962 - Leo de Kreynprijs
- 1965 - Arkprijs van het Vrije Woord
- 1971 - Bijzondere prijs van de Jan Campertstichting
- 1982 - Belgische staatprijs voor literatuur

== See also ==
- Flemish literature

== Sources ==
- Willy Roggeman
- G.J. van Bork en P.J. Verkruijsse, De Nederlandse en Vlaamse auteurs (1985)
