= Roger van de Velde =

Belgian writer

- Born: 13 February 1925; Boom, Belgium
- Died: 30 May 1970 (age 45); Antwerp, Belgium
- Occupation(s): author, journalist
- Spouse: Rosa Verboven (1947-1970)
- Children: 3

Roger van de Velde (13 February 1925 - 30 May 1970) was a Belgian author and journalist, known for his collections of short stories written while he was interred in psychiatric institutions.

== Early and professional life ==
Roger van de Velde was born in Boom, near Antwerp, the son of wine merchant Jan Frans van de Velde and Maria Callaer. When his father died in 1932, his mother remarried Louis Eykmans, a clerk at Willem Elsschot's advertising agency. He would become acquainted with the famous author, who assessed and gave advice about his poetry, as well as a short story, Scheiding van goederen (1954), which was published episodically in the magazine Standpunt.

Van de Velde joined the Belgian Army at the age of 21, but left after a year. His friendship with Elsschot helped him to get a job working as a journalist for the Nieuw Gazet in 1947, writing about a wide range of topics, including drama, football, politics and society of the day. He also had works published in Arsenaal en Nieuw Gewas.

All of his published literary works were written whilst in psychiatric institutions, and were subject to censorship. His first collection, Galgenaas (1966), was snuck out in a washing basket. The debate about van de Velde's imprisonment and censorship was reignited by Recht op antwoord (1969), a pamphlet describing his treatment and with criticism of the Belgian legal system. Fellow writers like Hubert Lampo, Jeroen Brouwers and Walter van den Broeck campaigned for his release, and he met the then-Minister of Justice, Alfons Vranckx. He was released for the final time on April 2, 1970.

== Personal life ==
Van de Velde married Rosa Verboven in 1947. They had three children: Thérèse, born in 1947, Max in 1950 and Luc in 1951.

== Illness and death ==
After falling ill with a gastric perforation at an Antwerp theater in 1947, van de Velde had multiple stomach operations. After the third of these, in 1958, he was prescribed the opioid painkiller Palfium, and soon became addicted. In 1961 he was stopped by the police for driving on the wrong side of the road and being under the influence. He was also found to have forged prescription notes. To avoid a jail sentence, he pleaded insanity, and he spent most of the final eight years of his life interned in psychiatric institutions.

Van de Velde died on 30 May 1970 from an accidental overdose of Palfium and a large amount of alcohol in an Antwerp café, only three days before he was supposed to start a drug rehabilitation program at the Jellinek clinic in Amsterdam.

== Bibliography ==
- Galgenaas (1966)
- De slaapkamer (1967)
- De knetterende schedels (1969)
- Recht op antwoord (1969)
- Kaas met gaatjes (1970)
- Tabula rasa (1970)
- De dorpsveroveraar (1973)

== Awards ==
- 1970 - Arkprijs van het Vrije Woord

== See also ==
- Flemish literature

== Sources ==
- Roger van de Velde
- G.J. van Bork en P.J. Verkruijsse, De Nederlandse en Vlaamse auteurs (1985)
