= Ward Ruyslinck =

Belgian writer

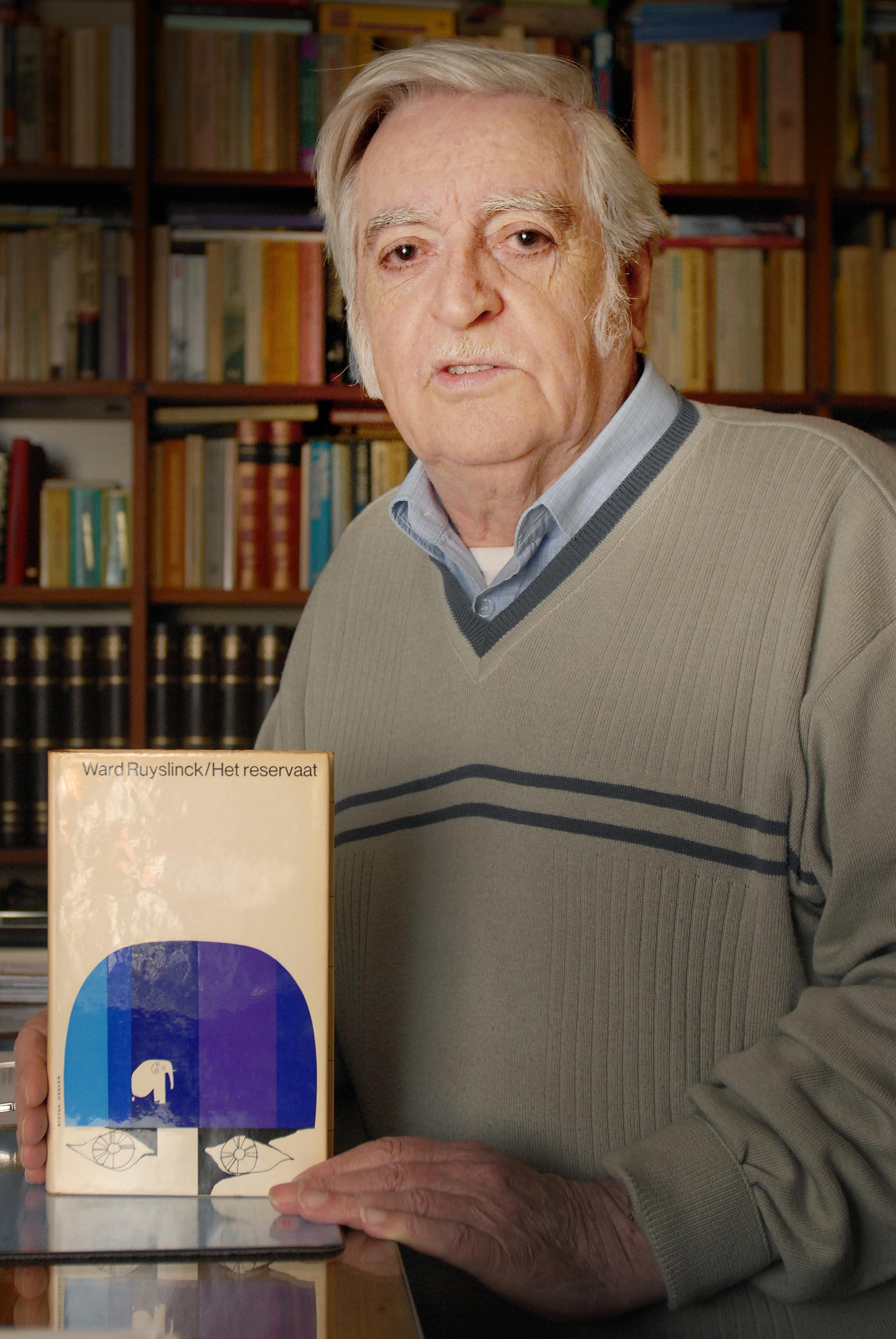
- Ward Ruyslinck with the first print of Het reservaat
- Born: Raymond De Belser; June 17, 1929; Berchem, Belgium
- Died: October 3, 2014 (aged 85); Meise, Belgium
- Occupation: Writer
- Writing career
- Pen name: Ward Ruyslinck
- Language: Dutch
- Notable works: Wierook en tranen, Het reservaat, Golden Ophelia
- Notable awards: Europalia Prize (1980), Arkprijs van het Vrije Woord (1960), August Beernaert Prize (1964)

Raymond De Belser (17 June 1929 – 3 October 2014), pseudonym Ward Ruyslinck, was a Belgian writer. He is the son of Leo De Belser and Germaine Nauwelaers. His father was a librarian at an oil company, and Ward Ruyslinck grew up in a Roman Catholic family. During the Second World War, the family moved to Mortsel.

== Early life ==
Ruyslinck was born in Berchem. At age 12, he had written a novel, Vaargeulen (in English, Channels). His father, who himself wrote the novel Gepantserde Beschaving (Armoured Civilization), sent his son's novel to Stijn Streuvels, who returned the novel unread but with an accompanying letter full of recommendations. The manuscript was lost during an air raid in 1943, which devastated their house. He wrote a number of poems and stories, some of which were published in the daily Het Vlaamsche land.

After he finished high school in 1947, he attended the University of Ghent to study Germanic philology. He dropped out after a year, which he has claimed was a consequence of the deep impact on him of the death of his older brother in 1948. He wrote five poems on the occasion of his brother's death, which were distributed among family and friends.

== Career ==
He has worked as a translator for a traveling agency and at an oil company. He was also appointed curator of the picture collection of the Plantin-Moretus Museum in Antwerp.

He married Alice Burm, and together they have one son, Chris.

His collection of poems, Fanaal in de mist (1956), was awarded the Poëzieprijs der Algemene Kunstkamer in België. In 1957, he published the short story De ontaarde slapers, about one of his main themes — the unequal battle between individuals and their communities.

His most widely read book Wierook en tranen ("Incense and Tears") was published in 1958. In 1961, with the novel Het dal van Hinnom, he broke with church and society. In 1964, he moved to Pulle and wrote the novel Het reservaat about the illusion of individual freedom. He won the Prijs voor Letterkunde van de Vlaamse provincies for this work. In 1966, he wrote the bittersweet fairy tale Golden Ophelia.

During the sixties and seventies he traveled a great deal to research magazine articles and visited Poland, the Soviet Union, Canada, and Argentina. In 1975, he became a member of The Royal Academies for Science and the Arts of Belgium, and he became its president in 1985. In 1980, he was awarded the first Europalia prize for his entire oeuvre.

Ward Ruyslinck retired in 1984. After the suicide of his wife in 1990, he moved to Meise to live with his mistress Monika Lo Cascio. Ward Ruyslinck and Monika Lo Cascio jointly wrote the autobiographical novel De speeltuin ("The Playground") in 1992.

Ruyslinck's work combines social commitment with a pessimistic view of life, humor, and satire. Several of his works were adapted for theatre. De slakken, Golden Ophelia, and Wierook en tranen were made into movies.

Ruyslinck, who suffered from Alzheimer's disease, died on 3 October 2014 in a retirement home in Meise.

== Bibliography ==
English

- The depraved sleepers, and Golden Ophelia. Boston, Twayne Publishers, 1978. (Transl. of De ontaarde slapers and Golden Ophelia, by Ralph Baden Powell & David Smith). ISBN 0-8057-8158-7
- The reservation. London, Owen, 1978. (Transl. of Het reservaat by David Smith.) ISBN 0-7206-0517-2
- Golden Ophelia. London, Owen, 1975. (Transl. of Golden Ophelia by David Smith.) ISBN 0-7206-0064-2
- The deadbeats. London, Owen, 1968 (Transl. of De ontaarde slapers by Ralph Baden Powell)

Dutch

- 1951 - De citer van Tijl
- 1952 - Het huis onder de beuken
- 1953 - De essentie van het zwijgen
- 1956 - Fanaal in de mist
- 1957 - De ontaarde slapers
- 1958 - Wierook en tranen
- 1959 - De madonna met de buil
- 1961 - Het dal van Hinnom
- 1962 - De stille zomer
- 1964 - Het reservaat
- 1965 - De paardevleeseters
- 1965 - Drek- en driftliteratuur
- 1966 - De oeroude vijver
- 1966 - Golden Ophelia
- 1968 - Het ledikant van Lady Cant
- 1969 - De Karakoliërs
- 1970 - De apokatastasis of het apocriefe boek van Galax Niksen
- 1971 - De krekelput
- 1971 - Neozoïsch. Parapoëtische montages
- 1972 - De heksenkring
- 1973 - De verliefde akela
- 1974 - Het ganzenbord
- 1976 - In naam van de beesten
- 1977 - De sloper in het slakkehuis
- 1977 - Valentijn van Uytvanck
- 1978 - Op toernee met Leopold Sondag
- 1979 - Alle verhalen
- 1980 - Wurgtechnieken
- 1981 - Open brief aan de gevoelsafschaffers
- 1982 - De boze droom het medeleven
- 1983 - Leegstaande huizen
- 1983 - Open beeldboek
- 1985 - De uilen van Minerva
- 1987 - Stille waters
- 1988 - Hunkerend gevangen
- 1989 - IJlings naar nergens
- 1992 - De speeltuin
- 1993 - De claim van de duivel
- 1995 - Het geboortehuis
- 1997 - De bovenste trede
- 1999 - Traumachia

== Awards ==
- 1958 - Romanprijs van de provincie Antwerpen
- 1958 - Romanprijs van de Kempische Cultuurdagen (Hilvarenbeek)
- 1959 - Referendum van de Vlaamse letterkundigen
- 1960 - Arkprijs van het Vrije Woord
- 1960 - Referendum van de Vlaamse letterkundigen
- 1962 - Referendum van de Vlaamse letterkundigen
- 1962 - De prijs van de Vlaamse lezer
- 1964 - August Beernaertprijs van de Koninklijke Academie voor Nederlandse Taal- en Letterkunde
- 1967 - Prijs voor Letterkunde van de Vlaamse Provinciën
- 1975 - Het Gulden Boek van de Lezende Jeugd (V.B.V.B.)
- 1976 - Romanprijs van de provincie Antwerpen
- 1980 - Europaliaprijs voor Literatuur
- 2005 - Prijs voor Letterkunde van de provincie Antwerpen voor het gezamenlijke oeuvre

== See also ==
- Flemish literature

== Sources ==
- Official website
- Website of Frits de Vries, biographer of Ward Ruyslinck
- Ward Ruyslinck
