= Freddy de Vree =

Belgian poet, literary critic, and radiomaker

Freddy de Vree (3 October 1939 in Antwerp – 3 July 2004 in Antwerp), pseudonym Marie-Claire de Jonghe, was a Belgian poet, literary critic and radiomaker. The past and death play an important role in his oeuvre. He was a friend of W.F. Hermans and Sylvia Kristel.

Freddy de Vree made his literary debut in 1966 with Goudfluit (E: Golden flute). As a poet, he made his debut in 1969 with Jaja (E: Yesyes), and in the same year he published De lemen liefde (E: Love of loam).

== Bibliography ==
- A Pollen in the Air (?)
- Het boek Alfa (?)
- Le tombeau de Pierre Larousse (?)
- Orbis militaris (?)
- Mots pour Karin (1963)
- Blues pour Boris Vian (1965)
- De lemen liefde (1969)
- Jaja (1969)
- A.C. (1971)
- Alsof zij niets was (1973)
- Rita Renoir, enz. (1973)
- Beleggen en beliegen (1975)
- Hugo Claus (1976)
- Pierre Alechinsky (1976)
- Steden en sentimenten (1976)
- De dodenklas (1977)
- Zao Wou-ki (1977)
- Erfgenamen van de dood (1978)
- Mexico vandaag (1982)
- Moravagine of de vervloeking (1982)
- Karel Appel (1983)
- Chicago! (1984)
- Jan Cremer (1984)
- De God Denkbaar Denkbaar De God (1985)
- Wyckaert (1986)
- Drie ogen zo blauw (1987)
- Jan Vanriet (1996)

== Awards ==
- 1977 - Arkprijs van het Vrije Woord

== See also ==
- Flemish literature

== Sources ==
- Freddy de Vree
- G.J. van Bork en P.J. Verkruijsse, De Nederlandse en Vlaamse auteurs (1985)
