= Rob Goswin =

Belgian writer

Rob Goossens (born 1943 in Schriek) pseudonym Rob Goswin is a Belgian artist and poet.

He is a teacher at the Royal Technical Athenaeum in Westerlo. In 1968, he founded, together with painter Jef Van Grieken and writer-actor Gerd de Ley, the magazine Rimschi. He was also editor of the magazine Impuls and currently editor of Imago.

== Bibliography ==
- Vanitas, Vanitas (novel)

== Awards ==
- 1973 - Ark Prize of the Free Word

== See also ==
- Flemish literature

== Sources ==
- Rob Goswin
