= Paula D'Hondt =

Belgian politician (1926–2022)

Paula D’Hondt
- Born: 27 August 1926; Haaltert, Belgium
- Died: 23 November 2022 (aged 96)

Paula Rosa D'Hondt-Van Opdenbosch, (27 August 1926 – 23 November 2022) was a Belgian Christian-Democratic politician who served as a minister and was given an award for her freedom of thought.

== Life and career ==
D’Hondt was born in Kerksken, Haaltert on 27 August 1926. From 1948 she worked as a social worker before she went into politics in the 1970s. She was senator from 1974 to 1991. She rose to be a minister in Belgium. From 1981 to 1988 she was Secretary of State for post and telecommunication, and in 1988 and 1989 she was the last minister of public works before the task was distributed to the regions.

Between 1989 and 1993, D'Hondt was appointed to lead a commission into the subject of immigration. She was given a number of awards including the Ark Prize of the Free Word in 2003 which is awarded for free thought. She had emphasised that immigrants had duties to the state as well as rights.

In 1992 D'Hondt was made Minister of State.

== Works ==
D'Hondt's written work includes Geen dienaar van de macht (No Servant of Power) which was published in 1993.
