= Marcel van Maele =

Belgian playwright and sculptor

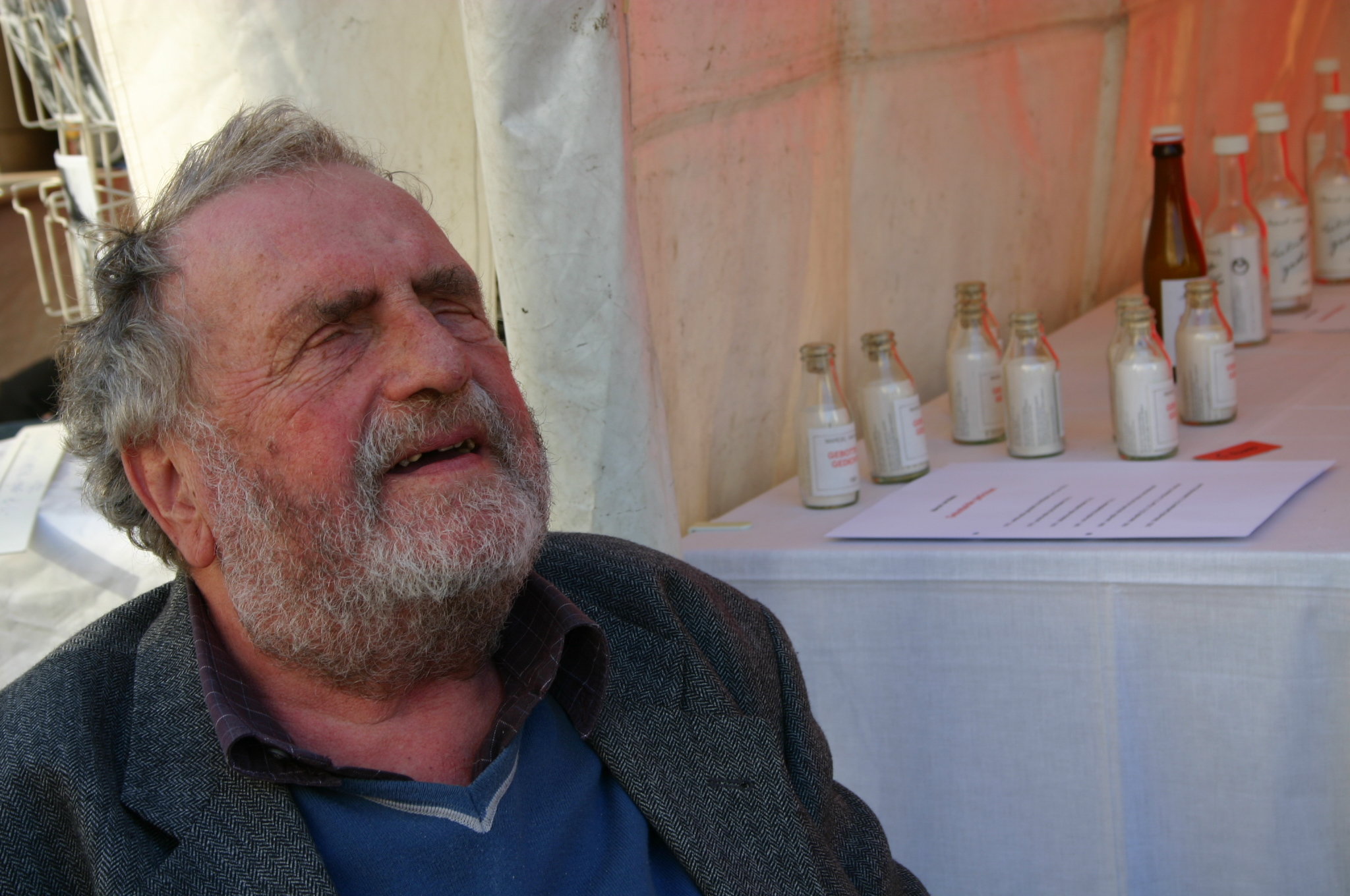
- Marcel van Maele, 2007
- Born: 10 April 1931; Bruges
- Died: 24 July 2009 (aged 78); Antwerp
- Notable awards: Arkprijs van het Vrije Woord (1972)

Marcel van Maele (Bruges, 10 April 1931 – Antwerp, 24 July 2009) was a Belgian playwright and sculptor. He was one of the leading figures of the magazine Labris (founded in 1962), in which an experimental style was prominent. He was a member of the Zestigers ('Group of the sixties'). Van Maele was completely blind for the last 20 years of his life. He died on 24 July 2009 at the age of 78 after a long and harsh sickbed.

== Bibliography ==
- Soetja (1956)
- Rood en groen (1957)
- Pamflet 1/Poëtische nota's over het bewustzijn (1960)
- Ik ben een kannibaal (1961)
- Ademgespleten (1962)
- Het manuscript (one act play, 1962)
- Zwarte gedichten (1963)
- De Bunker (one act play, 1963)
- Medgar Evers te Jackson vermoord (1964)
- De veroordeling van Marcel van Maele, gevolgd door een verrassende vrijspraak (one act play, 1966)
- Imponderabilia (1966)
- Kraamanijs (1966)
- Een zachtgroen bed vol bloed (play, 1968)
- No Man's Land (1968)
- Scherpschuttersfeest (1968)
- Zes nooduitgangen en één hartslag (1968)
- De hamster van Hampstead (1969)
- Hoera, wij hebben een bloedeigen heilig tuintje (1969)
- Revolutie (play, 1969)
- Koreaanse vinken (1970)
- Winteralbum (1970)
- Ik ruik mensenvlees, zei de reus (1971)
- Annalen (1972)
- Gedichten 1956-1970 (1972)
- Ach... (1973)
- Met een ei in bed (1973)
- Vakkundig hermetisch (1973)
- Tweeluik (1977)
- Vreemdsoortige cocktails (1977)
- Muggen en liegen (1980)
- Een rechthoek op het verkleurd behang (1986)
- Nu het geduld zijn hoge hoed verliest (1988)
- Rendez-vous (1996)
- Krassen in wat was (2001)
- Over woorden gesproken (2007)

== Awards ==
- 1972 - Arkprijs van het Vrije Woord for Ik ruik mensenvlees, zei de reus

(incomplete list)

== See also ==
- Flemish literature

== Sources ==
- van Bork, G. J.; Verkruijsse, P. J. (1985). De Nederlandse en Vlaamse auteurs.
- Fernand Auwera, Marcel van Maele In: Schrijven of schieten. Interviews (1969)
- Marcel van Maele
