= Jos De Haes =

Flemish writer and poet

Jos De Haes (Leuven, 22 April 1920-Jette, 1 March 1974) was a Flemish writer and poet.

== Bibliography ==
- Het andere wezen (1942)
- Pindaros. Pythische oden (1945)
- Ellende van het woord (1946)
- Gedaanten (1954)
- Richard Minne (1956)
- Reisbrieven uit Griekenland (1957)
- Sophokles. Philoktetes (1959)
- Azuren holte (1964)
- Verzamelde gedichten (1974)
- Verzamelde gedichten (1986)
- Gedichten (2004)

== Awards ==
- 1955 - Arkprijs van het Vrije Woord
