= Jozef Deleu =

Flemish poet, essayist and editor (1937–2026)

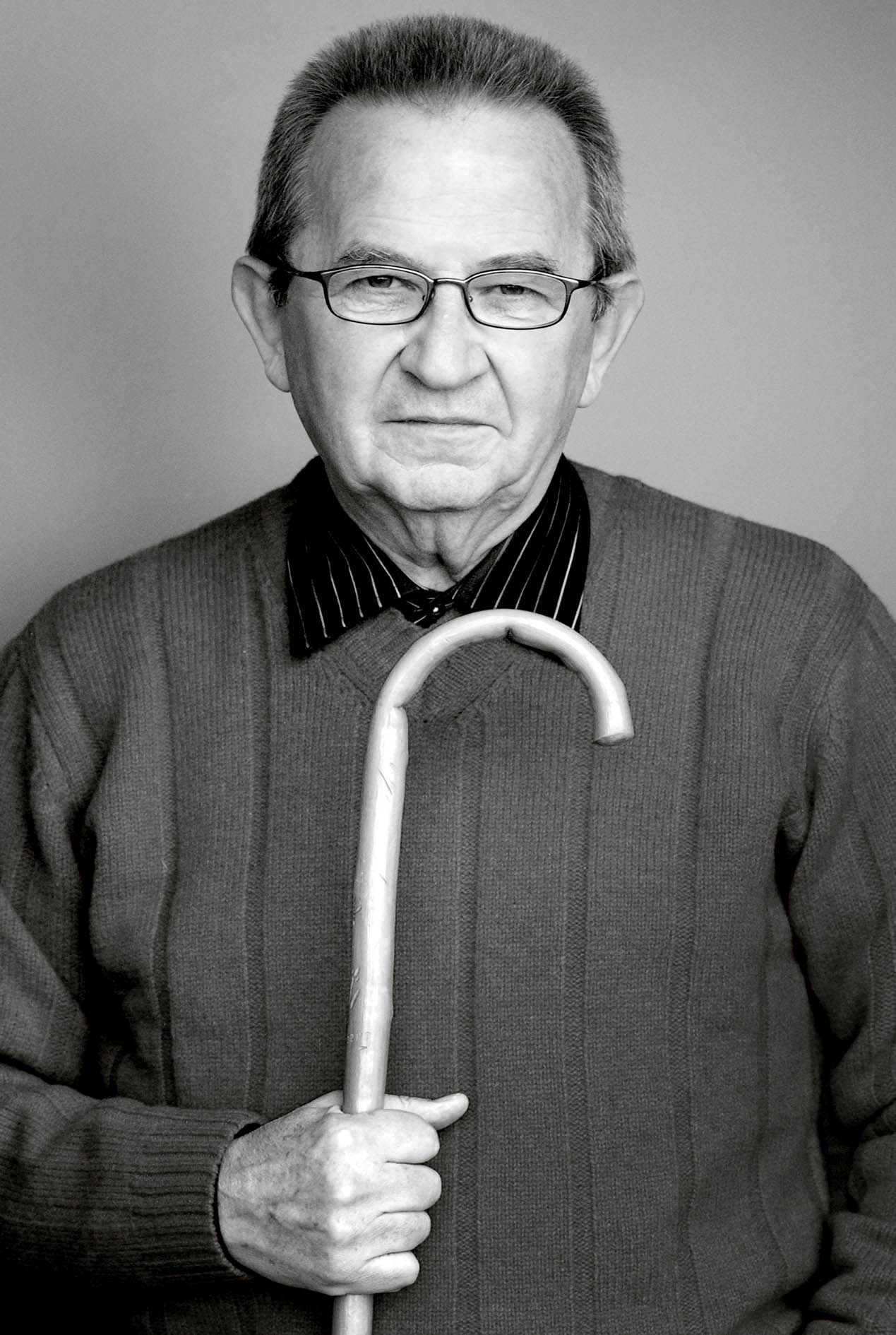
- Jozef Deleu
- Born: Jozef Hugo Maria Deleu; 20 April 1937; Roeselare, Belgium
- Died: October 2026 (aged 89)
- Occupations: Poet, prose writer, essayist, anthologist, magazine editor
- Spouse: Annemarie Deblaere
- Children: 3
- Writing career
- Language: Dutch
- Notable works: Groot Verzenboek; De pleinvrees der kanunniken; Ondoorgrond
- Notable awards: G. H. 's-Gravesande Prize (1981); Prize of the Flemish Government (2002); Ark Prize of the Free Word (2020); Taalpenning of the KANTL (2023)
- Website: www.jozefdeleu.be

Jozef Hugo Maria Deleu (20 April 1937 – October 2026) was a Flemish poet, prose writer, essayist and anthologist. When he was 20, Deleu founded Ons Erfdeel (now de lage landen), a Flemish-Dutch cultural magazine he ran until 2002 and expanded into a foundation publishing in Dutch, French and English. In retirement he started the poetry magazine Het liegend konijn, which he put together single-handedly from 2003 to 2025. In Flanders he was sometimes called the "culture pope".

== Early life ==
Deleu was born in Roeselare, West Flanders, on 20 April 1937, the youngest of seven children in a farming family. His father, Louis, was born in Lille in 1897 and gave up French nationality to become Belgian. He trained as a primary school teacher at the teacher training college in Torhout and taught from 1956 to 1970, first in Mouscron and then in Menen.

== Ons Erfdeel ==
The idea came from the writer André Demedts, who approached the nineteen-year-old Deleu at a 1956 meeting of the Committee for French Flanders. A year later the first issue of Ons Erfdeel ("Our Heritage") was out. It ran to 250 copies and was meant for young readers in West, Zeelandic and French Flanders. That soon changed. Deleu widened its scope to the whole Dutch-language area and built up a network of contributors in Belgium and the Netherlands; by 1982 circulation stood at 10,000.

Deleu gave up teaching in 1970. The magazine moved into the independent Ons Erfdeel Foundation, with Deleu as managing director, and from there he went after readers beyond the language border: Septentrion for French speakers in 1972, the bilingual yearbook De Franse Nederlanden / Les Pays-Bas Français for northern France in 1976, and, in 1993, The Low Countries for the English-speaking world. Its offices stood next to Deleu's home in Rekkem, on the Franco-Belgian border. Deleu stepped down as editor-in-chief and managing director on 30 April 2002 and was succeeded by Luc Devoldere.

He was also on the editorial board of the magazine Neerlandia in 1960–1961, and between 1969 and 1975 helped set up the first Encyclopedie van de Vlaamse Beweging (Encyclopedia of the Flemish Movement).

== Writing ==
His debut was a novella, De ontmoeting (1962). His first poetry collection, Schaduwlopen, followed a year later. Transience runs through all of it, verse and prose alike. Critic Karel Osstyn observed that the national border, literally on Deleu's doorstep in Rekkem, becomes in his writing an image of what cannot be bridged: between man and woman, between life and death. Osstyn traced the gloom back to the rural, Jansenist-tinged West Flemish world of Deleu's childhood. His collected poems, Ondoorgrond. Gedichten 1963–2019, were published by the Poëziecentrum in 2019, including the previously unpublished collection Tussentijd. Two further volumes of short pieces followed: Geluiden voor de laatste dag (2021) and Het paard van mijn vader (2023). A selection in French translation by Marnix Vincent appeared as Vivre la frontière (1999).

As an anthologist, Deleu compiled from 1976 onwards the Groot Gezinsverzenboek, later the Groot Verzenboek, a popular anthology of Dutch-language poetry which VRT described as the longest-running poetry anthology in the Low Countries, repeatedly reissued and expanded.

In 2003 he founded Het liegend konijn ("The Lying Rabbit"), a magazine publishing only previously unpublished contemporary poetry from Flanders and the Netherlands, by established poets and newcomers alike. He chose every poem himself. He also saw the magazine as an act of resistance against the indifference and lack of vision of the authorities responsible for arts and culture. In 2012 the Flemish Parliament marked his 75th birthday and the magazine's tenth anniversary. He produced 46 issues before the final one appeared in October 2025.

== Cultural politics ==
Deleu gave a number of widely discussed speeches on cultural policy, opposing the commercialisation of culture and a narrow Flemish nationalism, and criticising what he called the social climbing and complacency of an increasingly autonomous Flanders. He kept his distance from any party-political label. The title of the best known, De pleinvrees der kanunniken ("The agoraphobia of the canons", 1987), became proverbial in Flanders; in it he criticised a prosperous new Flemish elite for avoiding social problems. From 1 January 2005 he sat on the board of directors of the public broadcaster VRT.

== Death ==
Deleu died in October 2026, at the age of 89. The organisation de lage landen announced his death on 21 October, calling him one of the most influential advocates of the Dutch language and culture. De Morgen described him as one of the most important bridge-builders between Flanders and the Netherlands. He was married to Annemarie Deblaere and had three children.

== Honours and awards ==
In 1994 Ghent University awarded him an honorary doctorate as an "unofficial ambassador of the Dutch language and culture". He declined the noble title of baron.

Literary and cultural prizes

- Prize of the Flemish Poetry Days (1965)
- Visser-Neerlandia Prize (1970)
- Silver plaque of the Order of the Flemish Lion (1972)
- Silver Robert Schuman Medal, Stiftung F.V.S. (1973)
- G. H. 's-Gravesande Prize (1981)
- Prize of PEN Flanders (1991)
- Prize for Poetry of West Flanders (1995)
- Taaluniepenning of the Dutch Language Union (1995)
- Prize of the Flemish Government (2002)
- Prize for Flemish-Dutch Cultural Cooperation (2009, with Jeroen Brouwers)
- Ark Prize of the Free Word (2020)
- First Taalpenning of the Royal Academy of Dutch Language and Literature (2023)

State honours

- Commander of the Order of Orange-Nassau (Netherlands, 1996)
- Knight of the Ordre national du Mérite (France, 2001)
- Officer of the Ordre des Arts et des Lettres (France, 2003)
- Grand Officer of the Order of Leopold (Belgium, 2003)
- Grand Officer of the Order of the Crown (Belgium)

== Selected works ==
Poetry

- Schaduwlopen (1963)
- Nachtwerk (1970)
- Gezangen uit het achterland (1981)
- Tekenen van tijd (1984)
- De jager heeft een zoon (1995)
- Hazen troepen samen (2000)
- Onbeschut (2009)
- Overboord (2012)
- Ondoorgrond. Gedichten 1963–2019 (2019, collected poems)

Prose and miniatures

- De ontmoeting (1962, novella)
- De hazen aan de kim (1985)
- Gras dat verder groeit (2005)
- Geluiden voor de laatste dag (2021)
- Het paard van mijn vader (2023)

Essays and speeches

- Frans-Vlaanderen (1972, with Frits Niessen)
- De pleinvrees der kanunniken (1987)

Anthologies

- Groot Verzenboek (1976; many revised editions)
