= Jef Verschueren =

Belgian linguist, academic, and author (born 1952)

- Born: 1952 (age 73–74)
- Other name: (official) Jozef F. Verschueren
- Occupations: Linguist, academic, and author

Academic background
- Education: Licentiate in Germanic Languages and Literatures; M.A., Linguistics; PhD, Linguistics
- Alma mater: University of California, Berkeley

Jef Verschueren is a Belgian linguist, academic, and author. He is an emeritus professor of Linguistics at the University of Antwerp.

Verschueren is most known for his work on semantics, pragmatics, sociolinguistics, and discourse analysis. Among his authored works are his publications in academic journals, including Journal of Pragmatics, Journal of Linguistic Anthropology, Pragmatics, and Language in Society as well as books such as Handbook of Pragmatics, Debating Diversity, Analysing the Discourse of Tolerance, Ideology in Language Use and Complicity in discourse and practice.

Verschueren is a member of the Academy of Europe and co-founded the International Pragmatics Association (IPrA) in 1986, where he serves as its Secretary General.

== Education ==
Verschueren obtained a Licentiate in Germanic Languages and Literatures from the University of Antwerp in 1974 followed by an M.A. in Linguistics in 1976 from the University of California at Berkeley. Later in 1980, he obtained a PhD in Linguistics from the same institution.

== Career ==
Verschueren began his academic career in 1974 as a teaching assistant in English and general linguistics at the University of Antwerp. From 1975, he was employed by the Flemish Fund for Scientific Research, first as a doctoral student, then as postdoctoral fellow, research associate and research director. He was based at the University of Antwerp, where he took up a professorship in linguistics in 2000. Throughout his academic career.

At the University of Antwerp, where he has been emeritus professor of linguistics since 2017, Verschueren served as Vice Chairman of the Department of Germanic Languages and Literatures (1987 to 1991) Chair of the Linguistics Section at the Department of Germanic Languages and Literatures (from 1989 to 1991 and again from 1999 to 2001), and as Dean of the Faculty of Arts from 2001 to 2009.

== Research ==
Verschueren has authored numerous publications spanning linguistics, pragmatics, discourse, and ideology. In a journal article co-authored with Jan Blommaert, he explored the connection between language and nationalist beliefs in Europe. This work provided insights into how language functions as a means to advocate and reinforce nationalist ideologies.

More of Verschueren's theoretical work pertains to metalinguistic and metapragmatic phenomena, revealing them as manifestations of metapragmatic awareness, and it identified the mechanisms through which indicators of metapragmatic awareness operate within language usage. Similarly, an article published in Journal of Linguistic Anthropology underscored the significance of interactional processes and the varying levels of significance in communication, highlighting how these factors can lead to contradictions between implied meanings and explicitly conveyed information. Furthermore, he highlighted the importance of maintaining a clear methodological link between empirical data and conclusions in critical discourse analysis, emphasizing the need to consider all observable aspects and acknowledging the dynamic nature of form-function relationships in language.

Verschueren has also studied intercultural communication in migration contexts, urging a shift from essentialist cultural views and underscoring three dilemmas: communicative intent vs. inference, cultural assumptions vs. actual speech, and legal vs. personal narratives in power imbalances. In a 2013 study, he proposed an ethnography of communication approach for analyzing language use, communication-related ideologies, and historical developments within the international diplomacy community. Additionally, his work examined how different language versions of a text may influence interpretations, highlighted the role of pragmatics in shaping public understanding, and emphasized the need for a science of language usage in grasping global social and political differences in a globalizing public sphere.

== Works ==
Verschueren has edited and authored books covering a range of topics including cross-cultural and global communication, ideological studies, and linguistics. In 1985, he authored a book International News Reporting: Metapragmatic metaphors and the U-2 that examined linguistic approaches to international news reporting, focusing on metapragmatic metaphors in The New York Times' 1960 U-2 incident coverage for insights into global media communication. In his book titled Debating Diversity: Analysing the Discourse of Tolerance, co-authored with Jan Blommaert, he analyzed the language employed by individuals and institutions who embrace the idea of diversity in society and found a striking similarity between the discourse of these open-minded individuals and that of radical racist and nationalist factions. Mary Bucholtz, a professor of linguistics at UC Santa Barbara while reviewing the book said "Debating diversity, a pragmatic analysis of official liberal discourse concerning migration in Flemish Belgium, is a thorough, topical, and relevant treatment of the widespread yet near-invisible forms of racism that pervade public discourse on cultural difference." She also praised the authors for their work in emphasizing the way ideologies are formed, demonstrating their flexibility and potential for change.

Verschueren's 1999 publication Understanding Pragmatics is his most-cited publication. In her review of the book, Lynne Murphy said "That this volume is quite different from any other introduction to pragmatics is clear from the first chapter, which does within thirty pages what other books might spend several chapters doing – describing the pragmatic phenomena of deixis, speech acts, conversational maxims, and politeness. Instead of writing a taxonomy of pragmatic phenomena, Jef Verschueren has provided a handbook for thinking about language in use. As he says in the final chapter, the entire book can be taken to be an extended definition of pragmatics. His definition treats pragmatics not as a subdiscipline of linguistics or a subfield of linguistic competence (on a par with semantics or syntax), but as a perspective for the study of language.

Verschueren's book titled Ideology in Language Use: Pragmatic Guidelines for Empirical Research presented an approach to examining ideology in written language, utilizing the techniques, methodologies, and concepts of pragmatics and discourse analysis. In 2022, he authored the book titled Complicity in Discourse and Practice, that provided an analysis of contemporary challenges.

== Awards and honors ==
- 1975–1977 – Harkness Fellowship, Commonwealth Fund of New York
- 1997 – Rockefeller Foundation residency, Bellagio Study and Conference Center
- 2015 – Honorary Guest Professorship, Dalian University of Technology

== Bibliography ==
=== Books ===
- International News Reporting: Metapragmatic metaphors and the U-2 (Pragmatics & Beyond) (1985) ISBN 9780915027910
- Understanding Pragmatics (1998) ISBN 9780340646236
- Debating Diversity: Analysing the Discourse of Tolerance (1998) ISBN 9780415191388
- Ideology in Language Use: Pragmatic Guidelines for Empirical Research (2013) ISBN 9781107695900
- Complicity in Discourse and Practice (2022) ISBN 9781032072883

=== Selected articles ===
- Verschueren, J. (2000). Notes on the role of metapragmatic awareness in language use. Pragmatics: Quarterly Publication of the International Pragmatics Association (IPrA), 10(4), 439–456.
- Verschueren, J. (2001). Predicaments of criticism. Critique of anthropology, 21(1), 59–81.
- Blommaert, J., & Verschueren, J. (2005). The role of language in European nationalist ideologies. In Pragmatics: Quarterly Publication of the International Pragmatics Association (IPrA) 2(3), 355–375.
- Verschueren, J. (2008). Intercultural communication and the challenges of migration. Language and Intercultural Communication, 8(1), 21–35.
- Verschueren, J. (2014). Ethnography of communication and history: A case study of diplomatic intertextuality and ideology. Journal of Linguistic Anthropology 23(3), 142–159.
- Verschueren, J. (2016). Humanities and the public sphere: A pragmatic perspective. Pragmatics and Society 7(1), 141–161.
