= International Pragmatics Association =

- International Pragmatics Association (IPrA)
- Abbreviation: IPrA
- Formation: 1986; 40 years ago
- Founder: Jef Verschueren
- Founded at: Antwerp, Belgium
- Type: Nonprofit
- Legal status: International academic not-for-profit organization
- Purpose: Study of language use
- Fields: Pragmatics; Linguistics
- Key people: Marina Sbisà (Outgoing President), Michael Haugh (President), Yoshiko Matsumoto (Incoming President), Jan-Ola Östman (Treasurer), Mieke Vandenbroucke (Secretary General), Olga Krasnoukhova (Executive Secretary), Helmut Gruber (Editor-in-Chief), Maj-Britt Mosegaard Hansen, Melissa Moyer, Akin Odebunmi, Salvador Pons Bordería
- Publication: Pragmatics; Handbook of Pragmatics; Bibliography of Pragmatics
- Website: https://pragmatics.international/

The International Pragmatics Association (IPrA) is a scientific organization that focuses on the study of language use. It was established as a non-profit organization in 1986.

IPrA represents the interdisciplinary field of pragmatics, offering a functional perspective on language and communication from cognitive, social, and cultural viewpoints.

== Publications ==
IPrA has made contributions to pragmatics through conferences, handbooks, and its journal. It publishes the quarterly peer-reviewed academic journal Pragmatics, with Helmut Gruber serving as the Editor-in-Chief. Additionally, the Association maintains the annually updated Handbook of Pragmatics with Jan-Ola Östman and Jef Verschueren as its Founding Editors, and an online, freely accessible Bibliography of Pragmatics.

== History ==
In 1986, IPrA was established as a not-for-profit organization in Antwerp, Belgium. The idea on which its establishment was based dates back to 1979 when Herman Parret enlisted Marina Sbisà and Verschueren to co-organize a conference on "Possibilities and limitations of pragmatics" in Urbino, Italy. Another key event was the 1984 workshop "Between semantics and pragmatics," co-organized by Johan van der Auwera and Svenka Savić in Dubrovnik, Yugoslavia, which laid the foundation for the 1985 "International Pragmatics Conference" in Viareggio, Italy, co-organized by Marcella Bertuccelli Papi and Verschueren. The success of this conference confirmed the belief that pragmatics provided a mobilizing idea for collaborative and trans-disciplinary research relevant for addressing problems of human communication, forming the basis for the association's establishment. In the same year, the Consultation Board was formed, and John Gumperz agreed to act as IPrA's first President. In early 1986, the Association was officially set up with its seat in Antwerp, Belgium.

== Presidents ==
- 1986–1990: John Gumperz (University of California, Berkeley, Anthropology)
- 1991–1994: Sandra Thompson (University of California, Santa Barbara, Linguistics)
- 1995–1999: Ferenc Kiefer (Linguistic Institute, Hungarian Academy of Sciences)
- 2000–2005: Susan Ervin-Tripp (University of California, Berkeley, Psychology)
- 2006–2011: Sachiko Ide (University of Tokyo, Linguistics)
- 2012–2017: Jan-Ola Östman (University of Helsinki, Linguistics)
- 2018–2023: Stephen Levinson (Max Planck Institute, Linguistics)
- 2024–2025: Marina Sbisà (University of Trieste, Philosophy)
- 2026-2027: Michael Haugh (University of Queensland, Languages and Cultures)

== Conferences ==
IPrA has organized eighteen International Pragmatics Conferences, which are held biennially.

- 19-24 July 1998: Reims, France [on language and ideology]
- 9-14 July 2000: Budapest, Hungary [on cognition and language use]
- 13-18 July 2003: Toronto, Canada [on linguistic pluralism: policies, practices and pragmatics]
- 10-15 July 2005: Riva del Garda, Italy [on pragmatics and philosophy]
- 8-13 July 2007: Gothenburg, Sweden [on language data, corpora, and computational pragmatics]
- 12-17 July 2009: Melbourne, Australia [on diversity, context, and structure]
- 3-8 July 2011: Manchester, United Kingdom [on pragmatics and its interfaces]
- 8-13 September 2013: New Delhi, India [on narrative pragmatics: culture, cognition, context]
- 26-31 July 2015: Antwerp, Belgium [on language and adaptability]
- 16-21 July 2017: Belfast, Northern Ireland [on pragmatics in the real world]
- 9-14 June 2019: Hong Kong, China [on pragmatics of the margins]
- 27 June – 2 July 2021: Winterthur, Switzerland [on the pragmatics of inclusion]
- 9-14 July 2023: Brussels, Belgium [on the shape of interaction: the pragmatics of (a)typicality]
- 22-27 June 2025: Brisbane, Australia [action in pragmatics]

Its educational and outreach efforts consist of a mentoring program designed for young scholars, introductory pragmatics courses offered in different languages, and an archive featuring pioneers and leading voices in the field of pragmatics.
