= Frans Boenders =

Belgian writer

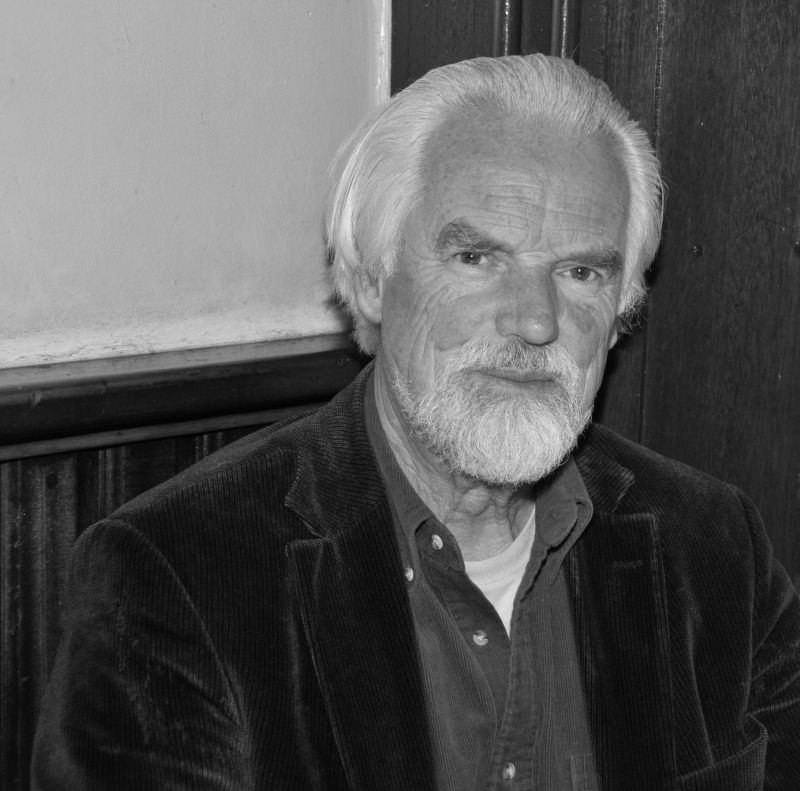
Frans Boenders

Frans Boenders (b. Antwerp, 28 September 1942) is a Belgian writer. He graduated in Germanic philology and philosophy at the Katholieke Universiteit Leuven. He worked for the Belgian radio as a producer.

== Bibliography ==
- Over Wittgenstein gesproken (1978)
- Denken in tweespraak (1978)
- Sprekend gedacht (1980)
- De goden uit het Oosten (1981)
- Tekens van lezen (1985)
- Tibetaans dagboek: Tibet in de jaren tachtig (1987)
- Kunst als intieme ervaring: over de stille kracht van poëzie (1993)
- Kailash, De Weg van de Berg (1997)
- Schrijvende denkers (2000)
- Europa (2000)
- Het onbestendige landschap (2001)

== Awards ==
- 1979 - Arkprijs van het Vrije Woord

== See also ==
- Flemish literature

== Sources ==
- Frans Boenders
