= Ons Erfdeel =

Cultural foundaction

Ons Erfdeel (est. 1970), sometimes translated or explained as Flemish-Netherlands Foundation, is a Dutch-Belgian non-profit organisation set up to spread cross-cultural understanding and awareness of (and between) the Dutch-speaking Flemish Region and the Netherlands, primarily through publicising their culture, history and language, as well as promoting the teaching and use of the Dutch language elsewhere in the world. The organisation publishes periodicals and websites in Dutch, French and English, and books and brochures in those and other languages. Its name derives from the cultural periodical Ons Erfdeel, established in 1957, with which the founders were involved and publication of which the organisation continued.

== History ==
The organisation Ons Erfdeel was established at Rekkem, West Flanders, on 17 September 1970, by Jozef Deleu, Rafaël Renard, Philip Houben, Maurits van Lerberghe and Paul Francken. In 1971, it also obtained recognition as a cultural non-profit under Dutch law, making it a Dutch-Flemish organisation. Its ambition was to become a Dutch-language counterpart to the Alliance française and the British Council. It has received government subsidies from both the Netherlands and Belgium to carry out its mission, but as of 2025 was facing cutbacks.

== Publications ==
Periodicals

- de lage landen, formerly Ons Erfdeel (bimonthly; in Dutch), published as Ons Erfdeel 1957-2019; as de lage landen from 2020
- Septentrion: Arts et culture de Flandre et des Pays-Bas (in French), since 1972
- De Franse Nederlanden – Les Pays-Bas français (annual; in Dutch and French), since 1976
- The Low Countries: Arts and Society in Flanders and the Netherlands (annual; in English), since 1994

Books and brochures

- Omer Vandeputte, Nederlands, taal van twintig miljoen Nederlanders en Vlamingen (1981; much reprinted)
  - Dutch: The Language of Twenty Million Dutch and Flemish People (1981; much reprinted; also available in several other languages)
- J.A. Kossmann-Putto and E.H. Kossmann, De Lage Landen: Geschiedenis van de Noordelijke en Zuidelijke Nederlanden (1987)
  - The Low Countries: History of the Northern and Southern Netherlands (1993)
- J. Goedegebuure and A.M. Musschoot, Hedendaagse Nederlandstalige Prozaschrijvers
- Hugo Brems and Ad Zuiderent, Hedendaagse Nederlandstalige Dichters (1993)
  - Contemporary Poetry of the Low Countries (1993)
- E. Stegeman and L. Bekkers, Hedendaagse Schilderkunst in Nederland en Vlaanderen (1995)
  - Contemporary Painting of the Low Countries, translated by Tanis Guest (1995)
- Marc Ruyters and Elly Stegeman, Hedendaagse beeldhouwers in Nederland en Vlaanderen (1998)
  - Contemporary Sculptors of the Low Countries (1998)

Websites

Three websites were launched in 2019:

- www.de-lage-landen.com (in Dutch)
- www.les-plats-pays.com (in French)
- www.the-low-countries.com (in English)

== Awards ==
- Orde van den Prince Prize (1971)
- Prijs voor Vlaanderen (1972)
- Prudens van Duyse Prize (1993)
- Joost van den Vondel Prize (1993)
