= List of Belgian women writers =

This is a list of women writers who were born in Belgium or whose writings are closely associated with that country.

== A ==
- Gia Abrassart, decolonial and feminist activist during the George Floyd protests in Belgium; journalist and author
- Christine Aventin (born 1971), best selling novelist, author of Le cœur en poche when just 15

== B ==
- Julia Bastin (1888–1968), French-language educator, novelist, translator
- Marguerite Baulu (1870–1942), French-language novelist
- Gabrielle Bernard (1893–1963), Walloon-language poet
- Rose Berryl (born 1982), novelist
- Bessora (born 1968), French-language novelist, short story writer
- Madeleine Bourdouxhe (1906–1996), French-language novelist
- Caroline Boussart (1893–1963), French-language journalist, short story writer, non-fiction writer, feminist
- Louise Bovie (1810–1870), French-language poet, short story writer
- Renée Brock (1912–1980), French-language poet, short story writer
- Elisa Brune (1966–2018), French-language novelist, journalist

== C ==
- Jeanne Cappe (1895–1956), French-language young adults writer, journalist, editor
- Élise Champagne (1897–1983), French-language poet, journalist
- Marie Closset (1873–1952), French-language poet, pen name Jean Dominique
- Anne Cluysenaar (1936–2014), Belgian-born Irish poet
- Marguerite Coppin (1867–1931), French-language novelist, poet, feminist
- Joanna Courtmans (1811–1890), Dutch-language poet, novelist
- Coralie van den Cruyce (1796–1858), writer, feminist and poet, writing in French

== D ==
- Saskia De Coster (born 1976), Dutch-language short story writer, novelist, columnist
- Christine D'haen (1923–2009), Dutch-language poet, biographer, translator
- Eugénie De Keyser (1918–2012), French-language essayist, novelist, educator
- Patricia De Martelaere (1957–2009), Dutch-language novelist, essayist, non-fiction philosophical works
- Els de Schepper (born 1965), Flemish actress and writer
- Gabriëlle Demedts (1909–2002), Flemish poet
- Rita Demeester (1946–1993), Dutch-language poet, novelist
- Sophie Deroisin, pen name of Marie de Romrée de Vichenet, (1909–1994), French-language novelist
- Maria Doolaeghe (1803–1884), Dutch-language poet, translator, non-fiction writer
- Louis Dubrau, pen name of Louise Janson-Scheidt, (1904–1997), French-language poet, novelist

== F ==
- Michèle Fabien (1945–1999), French-language playwright
- Pascale Fonteneau (born 1963), French-born Belgian journalist and novelist, wrote crime fiction for Série noire
- Vera Feyder (born 1939), Belgian novelist, poet and playwright
- Maud Frère (1923–1979), French-language novelist

== G ==
- Michèle Gérard (1945–1999), playwright, translator, used the pen name Michèle Fabien
- Marie Gevers (1883–1975), French-language novelist, translator, first women elected to Belgium's French-language academy
- Caroline Gravière (1821–1878), French-language novelist
- Éliane Gubin (born 1942), French-language historian, researcher, professor

== H ==
- Eugénie Hamer (1865–1951), French-language peace activist and writer
- Irène Hamoir (1906–1994), French-language surrealist poet, novelist
- Jacqueline Harpman (1929–2012), French-language novelist
- Marie-Louise Haumont (1919–2012), French-language novelist
- Kristien Hemmerechts (born 1955), Dutch-language novelist, short story writer

== J ==
- Lieve Joris (born 1953), non-fiction Dutch-language writer specializing in travel in Africa and the Middle East

== K ==
- Joséphine Nyssens Keelhoff (1833–1917), Belgian activist, social reformer, journal editor

== L ==
- Rachida Lamrabet (born 1970), Dutch-language novelist, short story writer, playwright
- Ariane Le Fort (born 1960), French-language journalist, novelist
- Suzanne Lilar (1901–1992), French-language journalist, essayist, novelist, playwright, feminist
- Rosalie Loveling (1834–1875), Dutch-language poet, novelist, essayist
- Virginie Loveling (1836–1923), younger sister of Rosalie (above), Dutch-language poet, novelist, essayist and children's writer

== M ==
- Malika Madi (born 1967), French-language novelist of Algerian origin
- Nicole Malinconi (born 1946), French-language novelist
- Françoise Mallet-Joris (1930–2016), French-language novelist
- Cécile Miguel (1921–2001), French-language writer and artist
- Capucine Motte (born 1971), Belgian-born French novelist
- Chantal Mouffe (born 1943), political theorist, academic and writer
- Jeanine Moulin (1912–1998), poet, literary scholar

== N ==
- Alice Nahon (1896–1933), Dutch-language poet
- Marie Nizet (1859–1922), French-language poet
- Amélie Nothomb (born 1966), highly successful French language novelist, short story writer, several works translated into English
- Colette Nys-Mazure (born 1939), French-language poet, novelist, short story writer, playwright, several works translated into English

== O ==
- Barbara Ogier (1648–1720), Flemish playwright

== P ==
- Marie Parent (1853–1934), Belgian journal editor, temperance activist, feminist and suffragist
- Sophie Podolski (1953–1974), French-language poet and graphic artist
- Anne Provoost (born 1964), Dutch-language novelist, essayist and short story writer, often writing for young adults
- Maria Pypelinckx (1538–1608), Dutch-language writer

== R ==
- Hilda Ram (1858–1901), Flemish writer
- Céline Renooz (1840–1928), non-fiction scientific works on evolution, epistemology, historiography
- Dominique Rolin (1913–2012), French-language novelist
- Maria Rosseels (1916–2005), Dutch-language journalist, novelist, essayist, critic
- Angélique de Rouillé (1756–1840), French-language letter writer

== S ==
- Aya Sabi (born 1995), Netherlands-born Dutch-language novelist, columnist
- Fanny Zampini Salazar (1853–1931), Belgian-born Italian writer and lecturer
- Aline Sax (born 1984), Flemish young people's novelist
- Carla Serena (1820–1884), writer and explorer
- Isabelle Spaak (born 1960), novelist, non-fiction writer
- Lize Spit (born 1988), Flemish novelist
- Lucienne Stassaert (born 1936), Dutch-language poet, playwright
- Irène Stecyk (born 1937), French language novelist

== U ==
- Chika Unigwe (born 1974), Nigerian-born, Belgian-immigrant novelist, short story writer, poet, children's writer, writes in Dutch and English

== V ==
- Marianne Van Hirtum (1925–1988), French-language surrealist poet
- Monika van Paemel (born 1945), Dutch-language (often autobiographical) novelist
- Louise van den Plas (1877–1968), suffragist and French-language writer
- Sylvia Vanden Heede (born 1961), Flemish children's writer
- Hilde Vandermeeren (born 1970), Dutch-language children's writer, newspaper editor, novelist
- Annelies Verbeke (born 1976), Dutch-language writer, successful novelist, also short story writer, playwright
- Stephanie Vetter (1884–1974), Dutch-born Belgian novelist, short story writer, women's rights advocate
- Maria de Villegas de Saint-Pierre (1870–1941), French-language writer and nurse

== W ==
- Carla Walschap (born 1932), Dutch-language novelist, evoking lesbianism in De Eskimo en de roos
- Monique Watteau (born 1929), acclaimed French-language novelist, illustrator
- Sandrine Willems (born 1968), French-language writer, television documentary director
- Évelyne Wilwerth (born 1947), French-language poet, novelist, short story writer, playwright
- Liliane Wouters (1930–2016), poet, playwright, essayist, several works translated into English

== Y ==
- Marguerite Yourcenar (1903–1987), French-language novelist, essayist, translator, first woman elected to the Académie française

== See also ==
- List of women writers
- List of French-language authors
- List of Dutch-language writers
