= 1974 in poetry =

Nationality words link to articles with information on the nation's poetry or literature (for instance, Irish or France).

== Events ==
- April – The dictatorship in Portugal falls; in the six months prior, with increasing repression and a discouraging atmosphere, little new work has been published; yet later in the year, not much new poetry is published either as "writers who had based their style on censor-proof allusiveness and their themes on protest would now have to do some retooling".
- July 23 – The dictatorial Greek junta falls; start of the Metapolitefsi: exiled poets, authors and intellectuals return to the country to publish there.
- October 4 – While Ann Sexton is having lunch with her friend, fellow poet and collaborator Maxine Kumin to review Sexton's most recent book, The Awful Rowing Toward God, without a note or any warning, Sexton goes into her garage, starts the ignition of her car and dies of carbon monoxide poisoning.
- The Jack Kerouac School of Disembodied Poetics is founded by Allen Ginsberg and Anne Waldman.

== Works published in English ==
Listed by nation where the work was first published and again by the poet's native land, if different; substantially revised works listed separately:

=== Australia ===
- Robert Gray, Creekwater Journal Australia
- Maiden, Jennifer. Tactics. St Lucia, Qld.: UQP.
- David Malouf, Neighbours in a Thicket : Poems
- Les Murray
  - "The Broad Bean Sermon"
  - Lunch and Counter Lunch
  - "The Mitchells"

=== Canada ===
- George Bowering, In the Flesh
- Matt Cohen, Peach Melba
- A.M. Klein, The Collected Poems of A.M. Klein.Toronto; New York: McGraw-Hill Ryerson.
- Patrick Lane, Beware the Months of Fire
- Irving Layton, The Pole-Vaulter. Toronto: McClelland and Stewart.
- Irving Layton, Seventy-five Greek Poems, 1951-1974. Athens: Hermias Publications.
- Dennis Lee, Not Abstract Harmonies But. Vancouver: Kanchenjunga Press
- Gwendolyn MacEwen, Magic Animals: Selected Poems Old and New. Toronto: Macmillan. ISBN 978-0-7705-1214-9
- Jay Macpherson, Welcoming Disaster: Poems, 1970-74. Toronto: Saannes Publications.
- P. K. Page, Poems Selected and New, selected and edited by Margaret Atwood
- Joe Rosenblatt, Blind Photographer. Press Porcepic.
- Raymond Souster, Change-Up: New Poems. Ottawa: Oberon Press.
- Raymond Souster and Douglas Lochhead, eds. 100 Poems of Nineteenth Century Canada. Toronto: Macmillan.
- Annie Szumigalski, Woman Reading in the Bath
- George Woodcock, editor, Poets and Critics: Essays from Canadian Literature 1966-1974, Toronto: Oxford University Press, scholarship

=== India, in English ===
- Shiv Kumar, Cobwebs in the Sun(Poetry in English),
- Keki N. Daruwalla:
  - Apparition in April ( Poetry in English ), Calcutta: Writers Workshop, India.
  - Crossing of Rivers ( Poetry in English ), New Delhi: Oxford University Press
- G. S. Sharat Chandra, Once or Twice (Poetry in English), Hippopotamus Press
- Syed Ameeruddin, The Dreadful Doom to Come and Other Poems, Madras: Poet Press India.

=== Ireland ===
- Austin Clarke, Collected Poems, including "The Lost Heifer", "The Young Woman of Beare", "The Planter's Daughter", "Celibacy", "Martha Blake", "The Straying Student", "Penal Law", "St Christopher", "Early Unfinished Sketch", "Martha Blake at Fifty-One", and "Tiresias" (died this year)
- Padraic Fallon, Poems (see also Poems and Versions 1983, Collected Poems 1990) Irish poet published in the United Kingdom
- John Montague, editor, The Faber Book of Irish Verse anthology (Faber and Faber) published in the United Kingdom
- Richard Murphy, High Island, including "Seals at High Island" and "Stormpetrel", Irish poet published in the United Kingdom
- Richard Ryan, Ravenswood Irish poet published in the United Kingdom

=== New Zealand ===
- Fleur Adcock, The Scenic Route, London and New York: Oxford University Press (New Zealand poet who moved to England in 1963)
- James K. Baxter, posthumous:
  - The Tree House, poems for children
  - The Labyrinth: Some Uncollected Poems 1944–72, edited by J. E. Weir
- Charles Brasch: Home Ground: Poems, Christchurch: Caxton Press (published posthumously)
- Allen Curnow, Collected Poems 1933–73
- Kendrick Smithyman, The Seal in the Dolphin Pool, Auckland: Auckland University Press and Oxford University Press
- Ian Wedde, Made Over

=== United Kingdom ===
- Dannie Abse, A Poet in the Family
- Fleur Adcock, The Scenic Route, New Zealand native living in and published in the United Kingdom
- Sir John Betjeman, A Nip in the Air
- W. H. Auden, Thank You, Fog (posthumous)
- Alasdair Clayre, A Fire by the Sea
- Donald Davie, The Shires
- Carol Ann Duffy, Fleshweathercock and Other Poems Outposts
- Douglas Dunn, Love or Nothing
- Odysseas Elytis, two English translations: The Axion Esti (trans. Edmund Keeley and G. Savidis) and The Sovereign Sun (trans. Kinom Friar)
- Padraic Fallon, Poems (see also Poems and Versions 1983, Collected Poems 1990)
- Flora Garry, Bennygoak and Other Poems.
- William R. P. George - Grawn Medi
- Karen Gershon, My Daughters, My Sisters
- Robin Hamilton, Poems
- John Heath-Stubbs, Artorius: A Heroic Poem in Four Books and Eight Episodes
- Tom Holt, Poems by Tom Holt
- Linton Kwesi Johnson, Voices of the Living and the Dead
- David Jones, The Sleeping Lord and Other Fragments
- Jenny Joseph, Rose in the afternoon, and Other Poems
- Susanne Knowles, The Sea-Bell and Other Poems
- Philip Larkin, High Windows
- Laurence Lerner, A.R.T.H.U.R. (see also A.R.T.H.U.R. & M.A.R.T.H.A. 1980)
- Edward Lucie-Smith, The Well-Wishers
- John Montague (ed.), The Faber Book of Irish Verse (Faber and Faber)
- Richard Murphy, High Island
- John Pudney, Selected Poems, 1967-1973
- Peter Reading, For the Municipality's Elderly
- Richard Ryan, Ravenswood
- Jon Silkin, The Principle of Water
- Alan Sillitoe, Storm: New Poems, London: W.H. Allen, ISBN 978-0-491-01772-5
- Joan Murray Simpson, In High Places
- C. H. Sisson, In the Trojan Ditch, collected poems and selected translations
- Iain Crichton Smith, Notebooks of Robinson Crusoe
- John Stallworthy, The Apple Barrel
- R. S. Thomas:
  - Selected Poems, 1946-1968
  - What is a Welshman?
- Anthony Thwaite, New Confessions
- Andrew Young, Complete Poems (posthumous)

=== United States ===
- Ai, Cruelty
- A.R. Ammons, Sphere: The Form of a Motion
- Ted Berrigan, The Drunken Boat
- Joseph Payne Brennan:
  - Death Poems
  - Edges of Night
- Ed Dorn:
  - Recollections of Gran Apacheria, Turtle Island
  - Slinger (contains Gunslinger, Books I-IV and "The Cycle"), Wingbow Press
- Jill Hoffman, Mink Coat
- Galway Kinnell, The Avenue Bearing the Initial of Christ into the New World
- Judith Kroll, In the Temperate Zone
- James Merrill: "Lost in Translation", one of the most studied and celebrated of his shorter works, was originally published in The New Yorker magazine on April 8, and published in his 1976 book Divine Comedies.
- Michael Palmer, The Circular Gates (Black Sparrow Press)
- George Quasha, Word-Yum: Somapoetics 64-69: Seventh Series
- James Reiss, The Breathers (Ecco Press)
- Charles Reznikoff, By the Well of Living & Seeing: New & Selected Poems 1918-1973
- Michael Ryan, Threats Instead of Trees (Yale University Press)
- Anne Sexton, The Death Notebooks
- Gary Snyder, Turtle Island
- Reed Whittemore, The Mother's Breast and the Father's House

==== Anthologies ====
- George Quasha (with Susan Quasha), An Active Anthology (Sumac Press)

==== Translations in the United States ====
- Ernesto Cardenal, translated from Spanish, Homage to the American Indians
- W. S. Merwin and Clarence Brown, translation, Osip Mandelstam: Selected Poems, New York: Oxford University Press (reprinted in 2004 as The Selected Poems of Osip Mandelstam, New York: New York Review of Books)
- Michael Smith, translator, Trilice, from the original Spanish of César Vallejo
- J. M. Cohen, translator, Sent off the Field from the original Spanish of Fuera del juego by Heberto Padilla

=== Other ===
- Christopher Hope, Cape Drives (South Africa)

== Works published in other languages ==
Listed by nation where the work was first published and again by the poet's native land, if different; substantially revised works listed separately:

=== Denmark ===
- Poul Borum, Sang til dagens glæde
- Jørgen Gustava Brandt, Her omkring
- Klaus Høeck, Transformations, publisher: Gyldendal
- Henrik Nordbrandt, Opbrud og ankomster ("Departures and Arrivals"), Copenhagen: Gylandal, 72 pages
- Vagn Steen, Fuglens flugt i halvkrystal

=== French language ===
==== Canada, in French ====
- Rémi-Paul Forgue, Poèmes du vent et des ombres
- Michel Garneau, Moments
- Jean Royer, La parole me vient de ton corps suivi de Nos corps habitables: Poèmes, 1969-1973, Montréal: Nouvelles éditions de l'Arc

==== France ====
- Anne-Marie Albiach, "HII" linéaires
- Michel Béguey, Par des chemins secrets
- Maurice Courant, O toi que le vent glace
- Philippe Denis, Cabier d'ombres
- Pierre Emmanuel, Sophia
- Claude Fourcade, Le Florilège poétique
- Roger Giroux, Voici, published posthumously (died 1973)
- Eugène Guillevic, encoches
- Philippe Jaccottet, Chant d'en bas
- Patrice de La Tour du Pin, Psaumes de tous mes temps
- Jean Lebrau, Singles
- Jean-Claude Renard, Le Dieu de nuit
- Robert Mallet, Quand le mirior s'etonne
- Pierre Menanteau, Capitale du souvenir
- Alain Veinstein, Répétition sur l'amas

===== Criticism, scholarship and biography in France =====
- Jean Follain, Collège, memoirs
- Pierre Segher, La Résistance et ses poètes

==== Other, in French ====
- Andrée Sodenkamp La Fête debout (Belgium)

=== German language ===
==== West Germany ====
- Jürgen Becker, Das Ende der Landschaftsmalerei
- Erich Fried, Gegengift
- Hermann Kesten, Ich bin der ich bin

=== Hebrew ===
- N. Alterman, Regayim (posthumous)
- T. Carmi, Hitnatzlut ha-Mechaber
- Haim Gouri, Mar`ot Gihazi ("Gehazi Visions"), Israel
- Y. Lerner, Shirim
- N. Sach, Mivhar
- H. Schimmel, Shirai Malon Zion
- A Shllonsky, Sefer ha-Sulamot (posthumous)
- N. Stern, Bain Arpilim
- M. Wieseltier, Kach

=== Hungary ===
- György Petri, Körülírt zuhanás

=== India ===
In each section, listed in alphabetical order by first name:

==== Bengali ====
- Debarati Mitra, Indian, Bengali-language:
  - Andha Skoole Ghanta Baje. Kolkata: Satarupa
  - Amar Putul, Kolkata: Satarupa
- Nirendranath Chakravarti, Khola Muthi, Kolkata: Aruna Prokashoni; Bengali-language

==== Other in India ====
- Jayant Kaikini, Rangadindostu doora, Sagar, Karnataka: Akshara Prakashana, Indian, Kannada-language poet, short-story writer, and screen writer
- K. Satchidanandan, Atmagita ("The Song of the Self"); Malayalam-language
- Niranjan Bhagat, Yantravijnan and Mentrakavita, criticism; Gujarati-language
- Sitanshu Yashaschandra, Odysseusnu-n Halesu, Mumbai and Ahmedabad: R R Sheth & Co.; Gujarati-language
- Thangjam Ibopishak Singh, Shingnaba ("Challenge") (Co-authored), Imphal: Authors; Meitei language

=== Portuguese language ===
==== Brazil ====
- Francisco Alvim, Passatempo
- Geraldo Carneiro, Na Busca do Sete-Estrelo
- Ledo Ivo, O Sinal Semafórico (posthumous)
- Stella Leonardos:
  - Amanhecéncia
  - Romançário
- Ariano Suassuna, A Farsa da Boa Preguiça

==== Portugal ====
- Ruy de Moura Belo, A margem da alegria ("The Riverbank of Happiness")
- Fiama Brandão, collected verse, with additions
- Fernando Echevarria, A Base e o Timbre
- Egito Gonçalves, Destruição: Dois Pontos
- Herberto Helder, collected poems to date
- Jorge de Sena, Conheço o Sal
- Pedro Támen, Os 42 Sonetos

=== Russian ===
- M. Kanoatov, The Voice of Stalingrad (translated into Russian from Tajik), 1973
- M. Lukonin, Frontline Verse
- Aleksandr Solzhenitsyn Prussian Nights (finished in 1951), published in the original Russian in Paris
- L. Tatyanichev, The Honey Season

=== Sweden ===
- Reidar Ekner, Efter flera tusen rad
- Lars Forssell, Det möjiliga
- Gunnar Harding and Rolf Aggestam, editors, Tjugo unga poeter, an anthology of modern poetry
- Lars Norén, Dagliga och nattliga dikter
- Tomas Tranströmer, Baltics (Östersjöar)

=== Yiddish ===
- Pinche Berman, Love
- Moishe Broderzon, The Last Song (posthumous)
- Meir Charatz:
  - Heaven and Earth
  - In Strange Paradise
- Eliezer Greenberg, Memorabilia
- Shifra Kholodenko, The Word
- Rachel Kramf, Clouds Wish to Cry
- Saul Maltz, Poems of My Profound Belief
- Joseph Mlotek and Eleanor Mlotek, editors, Pearls from Yiddish Poetry (anthology), poems printed in the Sunday editions of the New York Jewish Daily Forward
- Roza Nevadovska, Poems of Mine (posthumous)
- Hillel Shargel, A Window to Heaven
- Abraham Sutzkever, The Fidlerose
- Malka Heifetz Tussman, Under Your Mark
- Freed Weininger, In the Wide Outside
- Isaac Yanosovich, The Other Side of Wonder
- Hersh Leib Young, In the Astral Spheres

=== Spanish Language ===
==== Spain ====
- Vicente Aleixandre, Diálogos del conocimiento
- Matilde Camus, Templo del Alba ("Temple of Dawn")

==== Latin America ====
- Pablo Neruda:
  - La rosa separada
  - Jardín de invierno
  - Defectos escogidos
  - 2000 El corazón amarillo
  - Libro de las preguntas
  - Elegía
  - El mar y las campanas
- Efraín Huerta, Los eróticos y otros poemas (Mexico)
- Elvio Romero, Antología poética 1947-73, second edition (Paraguay)
- Luis Cardoza y Aragón, Quinta estación

=== Other ===
- Odysseas Elytis, Τα Ετεροθαλή ("Step-Poems") Greece
- Luo Fu, Magical Songs, Chinese (Taiwan)

== Awards and honors ==
=== Australia ===
- Grace Leven Prize for Poetry: David Malouf, Neighbours in a Thicket : Poems

=== Canada ===
- See 1974 Governor General's Awards for a complete list of winners and finalists for those awards.

=== United Kingdom ===
- Cholmondeley Award: D.J. Enright, Vernon Scannell, Alasdair Maclean
- Eric Gregory Award: Duncan Forbes, Roger Garfitt, Robin Hamilton, Frank Ormsby, Penelope Shuttle
- Queen's Gold Medal for Poetry: Ted Hughes

=== United States ===
- Consultant in Poetry to the Library of Congress (later the post would be called "Poet Laureate Consultant in Poetry to the Library of Congress"): Stanley Kunitz appointed this year.
- Frost Medal: John Hall Wheelock
- National Book Award for Poetry, Allen Ginsberg, The Fall of America: Poems of these States, 1965-1971 and Adrienne Rich, Diving into the Wreck: Poems 1971–1972
- Pulitzer Prize for Poetry: Robert Lowell, The Dolphin
- Fellowship of the Academy of American Poets: Léonie Adams

=== French language ===
==== France ====
- French Academy: Grand Prix de la Poésie: Philippe Soupault

== Births ==
- September 20 – Owen Sheers, Fijian-born Welsh poet, novelist and journalist
- September 25 – Scott Ransopher, American poet
- Sasha Dugdale, English poet and translator
- Choman Hardi, Kurdish poet, translator and painter

== Deaths ==
Birth years link to the corresponding "[year] in poetry" article:

- January 20 – Edmund Blunden (born 1896), English poet, author and critic
- February 4 – Ozaki Kihachi 尾崎喜八 (born 1892), Japanese, Shōwa period poet
- February 20 – Matilde Hidalgo (born 1889), Ecuadorian physician, poet and women's rights activist
- March 19 – Austin Clarke, Irish poet, novelist and playwright
- April 18 – Eric Roach (born 1915), Tobagonian poet, suicide
- June 9 – Miguel Ángel Asturias, 74, Guatemalan poet, author, writer, journalist and diplomat
- July 5 – John Crowe Ransom, 86, American poet, editor and academic critic
- July 11 – Pär Lagerkvist, 83, Swedish poet, author, playwright, writer and winner of the Nobel Prize in Literature in 1951
- July 24 – Parker Tyler, 70, American film critic and poet
- August 22 – Jacob Bronowski, 66, Polish-born English polymath and poet
- September 6 – Julian Davis, 72, American
- September 15 – Ikuma Arishima, 有島生馬 pen-name (together with Utosei and then Jugatsutei) of Arishima Mibuma (born 1882), Japanese novelist, poet and painter; member of the Shirakaba literary circle
- October 4 – Anne Sexton, 45, American poet, suicide;
- October 9 – Padraic Fallon, 69, Irish (see "Works published in English" section, above)
- October 16 – Edasseri Govindan Nair (born 1906), Indian, Malayalam-language poet
- October 21 – Kaoru Maruyama 丸山 薫 (born 1899) Japanese
- October 28 – David Jones, 78, English poet and artist
- December 16 – Kostas Varnalis (born 1884), Greek
- Also:
  - Buddhadeb Bosu (born 1908), Bengali
  - Paula Ludwig (born 1900), German

== See also ==
- Poetry
- List of poetry awards
- List of years in poetry

== Notes ==
- Britannica Book of the Year 1975 ("for events of 1974"), published by Encyclopædia Britannica 1975 (source of many items in "Works published" section and rarely in other sections)
