= Marie-Thérèse Bodart =

Belgian novelist, essayist, and playwright

- Born: Marie-Thérèse Guillaume; 7 August 1909
- Died: 11 August 1981 (aged 72)
- Resting place: Cemetery of the Church of Saint-Aubert at Mont-Saint-Aubert
- Citizenship: Belgian
- Genre: Novel; Essay; Theatre
- Notable awards: Prix Auguste Beernaert; 1961
- Spouse: Roger Bodart
- Children: Anne Richter

Marie-Thérèse Bodart (née Guillaume, 1909–1981) was a Belgian novelist, essayist, and playwright noted for her historical, emotional, and fantastical subject matter. Having studied history, she was also a professor at the Lycée d'Ixelles in Brussels. She was married to the Belgian poet and academic Roger Bodart, and she was the mother of the writer Anne Richter, and grandmother of essayist Florence Richter.

== Early life and education ==
Marie-Thérèse's family had roots in Paris and Habay. She was born 7 August 1909 to Eugénie Jacminot and Bernard Guillaume, a prison director in Mons. Marie-Thérèse’s mother died in childbirth when she was two years old. She was subsequently raised by her grandmother, Julie Jacminot, until her father remarried. Bernard Guillaume had two daughters from his second marriage, one of whom, Marcelle (a novelist who entered Brialmont Abbey as Sister Emmanuelle) remained close to Marie-Thérèse, and to whom the latter dedicated her novel about a religious vocation, Le Mont des Oliviers (The Mount of Olives).

In 1933, Guillaume earned her licenciate in history with great distinction from the Université libre de Bruxelles (ULB). Her interest in history may have come from her notable ancestor General Jean-François Jacqueminot, who had fought alongside Napoleon and whose remains lie in the Panthéon in Paris.

== Personal life ==
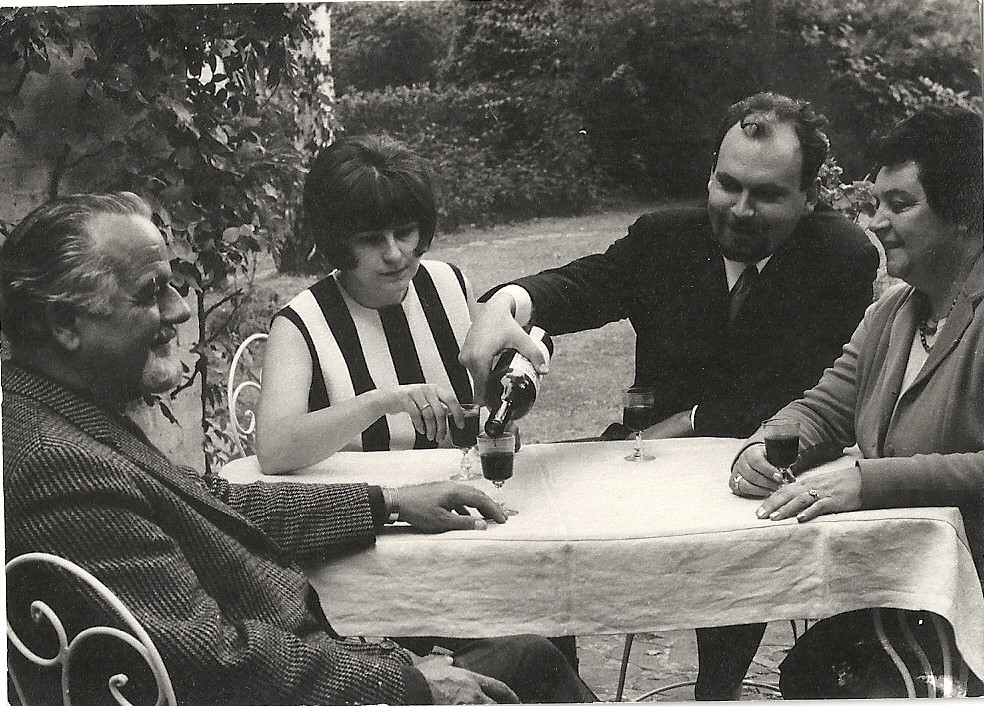
Marie-Thérèse Bodart's family in Auderghem in 1966 (left to right: Hugo Richter, Anne Richter, Roger Bodart, Marie-Thérèse Bodart)

Guillaume met her future husband Roger Bodart at ULB, and the pair married in 1934. Bodart was a jurist who started his career in Liège as a lawyer, then became a journalist at the National Institute of Radio Broadcasting, and then a literary advisor at the Belgian Ministry of Public Instruction; he was also a poet, essayist, and later an academic. The couple had two daughters: Anne (born 1939) and Françoise (born 1945). Anne would go onto marry the professor and literary translator Hugo Richter and have a writing career of her own.

Beyond the relationships with artists and writers that Roger fostered over the course of his work at the ministry, the Bodarts developed friendships with several painters (notably Frans Depooter, for whom Marie-Thérèse modelled), as well as writers and other intellectuals including Charles Plisnier, Gabriel Marcel, Auguste Marin, Charles Du Bos, Pierre Emmanuel, Franz Hellens, Jean Tordeur, Charles Bertin, Lucienne Desnoues and Jean Mogin, Serge Young, Norge, Jacques Biebuyck, Michel Thiry, Marcel Lecomte, Chaïm Perelman (whom the Bodarts hid from the Nazis in their house during WWII), Marie Gevers, Suzanne Lilar, Pierre Nothomb, Géo Libbrecht, Liliane Wouters, and Madeleine Davy.

Bodart kept a personal diary from the age of sixteen between the years of 1926 and 1974. In the diary, she wrote about her family life, meetings with friends, societal and intellectual thoughts, impressions of nature, convictions and personal opinions about sociopolitical life and culture (Belgian and international), what she read and saw in the arts, and ideas for her own writing. While the tone of the journal evolved with time and circumstances, every “notebook” of this work maintained a character of passionate and insatiable curiosity, who was at once a wife, mother, grandmother, history professor, intellectual, and artist.

This personal diary was analyzed by professor François Ost in a 2023 article. A fictional version of the diary is also found in her daughter Florence Richter’s 2023 novel Rose étrange au Mont des Arts, in which she reproduced some real extracts from Bodart’s diary. Her diary can be found on the French website Autobiosphère, which is dedicated to analyzing the work of diarists.

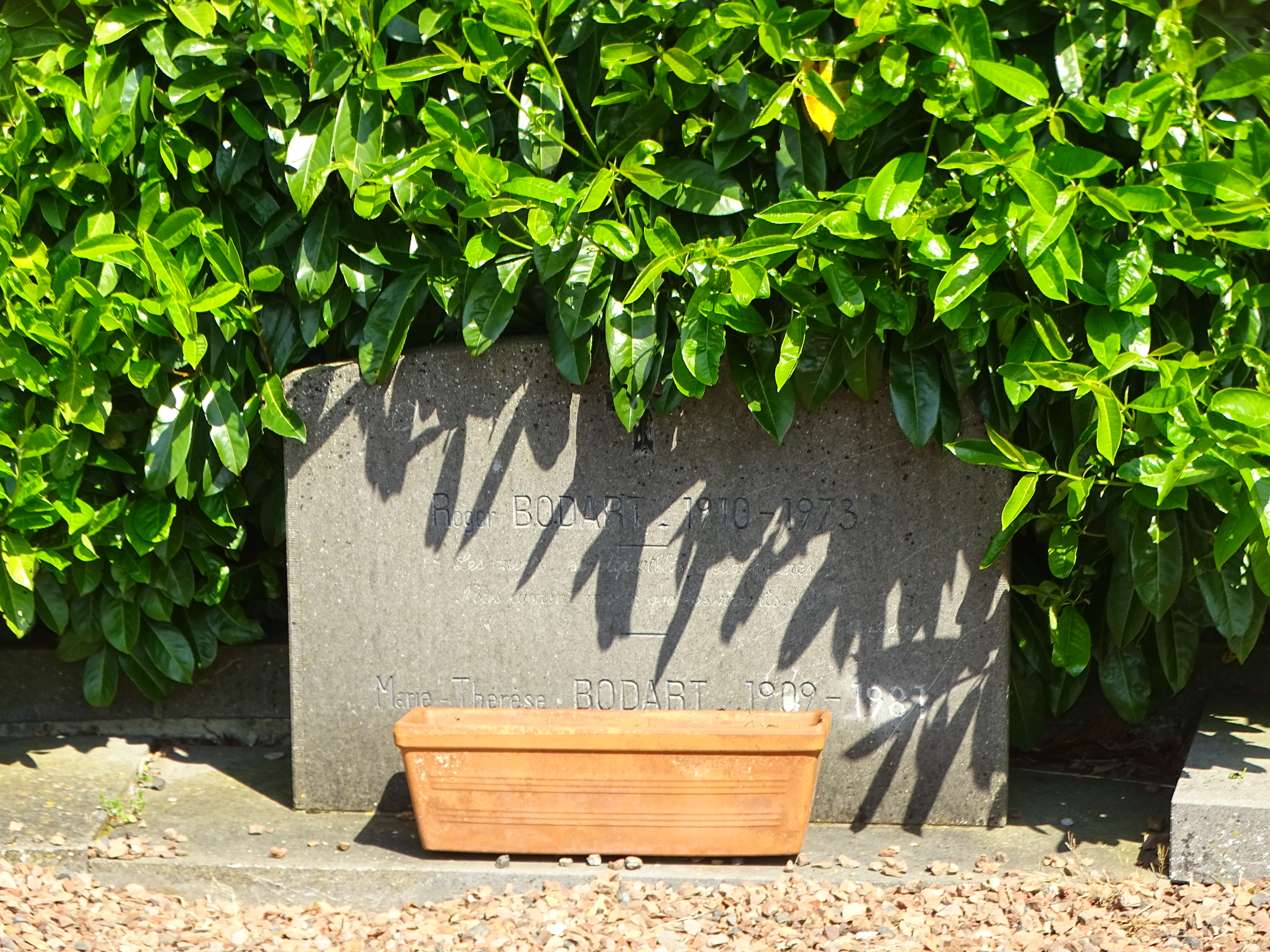
The Bodart couple's tombstone

== Death ==
Bodart died August 11, 1981 in Auderghem. She was buried with her husband in the garden of poets (fr) in Mont-Saint-Aubert near Tournai.

== Career ==
=== Scandal and success of her first novel ===
Bodart spent most of her working life as a history professor at the Lycée d'Ixelles, but before then she taught at the girls' middle school in Verviers. She was fired from the latter with much commotion in 1938 upon the publication of her first novel, Les Roseaux noirs (The Black Reeds), a story of passion, incest, and adultery which, according to the director of the school and the moralistic press of Verviers, was scandalous, full of "monstrous things" and liable to corrupt the young girls at the institution. Conversely, literary critics in Paris and Belgium spoke very highly of this first book, for which Bodart was a finalist for the Prix Femina. Following the tumultuous events surrounding the publication of this first novel, the Bodarts left Liège and moved to Brussels.

Les Roseaux noirs was inspired by Emily Brontë's Wuthering Heights as well as a distant branch of Bodart's own family, while the "vast house" featured in the novel is the Bua estate (near Arlon), which had belonged to the Jacminots, and which in modern times is owned and occupied by a religious community.

=== Other work, style, and themes ===
Throughout Bodart's works, the grand processes of history always intermingles with the personal stories of the characters. Several of her novels, including Les roseaux noirs and L'Autre (The Other), take place in the Fagne region, where Bodart had lived during her childhood.

Her interest in history led Bodart to publish an essay on Leo Tolstoy.

But the works of Bodart are also full of metaphysical explorations reminiscent of Georges Bernanos or Graham Greene. She has an affinity for paroxysmal and very sensual characters, and those tormented by absolute good and evil. Her earlier work (such as Les Roseaux noirs) was written in a beautiful classical style, and later on she developed an ascetic but alert voice (as in L'Autre). Her work features exceptional beings, monsters fighting at the heart of extreme circumstances, full of inner turmoil and boiling passion.

While most of her novels are realistic, there is a part of her œuvre that belongs to the Belgian school of the strange: her novels L'Autre and Les Meubles (The Furniture) belong more properly to fantasy. In L'Autre, considered her best novel, three contradictory perspectives present the strange and possibly diabolical facts around the collapse of an entire family.

Bodart also wrote plays which present worlds in transition: Renaissance Europe in Et Adam répondit (And Adam Answered, about the rivalry between Savonarola and da Vinci), but also her modern day in Le Monde éclatera demain (The World Will Fall Apart Tomorrow, a piece which investigates the responsibility of modern scientists who have the power to destroy humanity. These plays were created at the Royal Park Theatre.

She was also a literary columnist for the international journal Synthèses.

Bodart's fiction resisted the influence of the absurdist fiction of the 20th century, and she wrote a singular collection of works which affirms the deep solidarity of human life amidst existential chaos.

When three of her novels received new editions in 2014 by Éditions Samsa / Académie, critic and writer Jacques de Decker said in an interview in Le Soir, "this writer has intrigued us for a while. We looked at the novels. We were astounded. These three books are so profoundly original, violent in their subject matter, visionary, with fantastical elements, and a psychoanalytical force. She is a jewel of Belgian literature that we had completely forgotten. And the work is very modern."

== Selected works ==
=== Novels ===
- Les Roseaux noirs (The Black Reeds), preface by Charles Plisnier, éditions Corrêa, Paris, 1938
  - Dutch translation by J. De Boer-Van Strien: Het Zwarte Riet, uitg. Ad. Donker, Rotterdam, 1962
- La Moisson des orges (Harvesting Barley), éditions Corrêa, Paris, 1946. New edition by Samsa, 2021.
- Le Mont des Oliviers (The Mountain of Olive Trees), éditions de Navarre, Paris, 1956. New edition by Samsa, preface by Pascale Toussaint, 2022
  - Italian translation by Antonio Mor: Il Monte degli Ulivi, Nuova Accademia ed., Milano, 1962
- L'Autre (The Other), éditions Le Monde du Livre, Anvers and Brussels, 1960, Prix Auguste Beernaert (Royal Academy of Belgium)
- Les Meubles (The Furniture), edited by André de Rache, Brussels, 1972
- Les Roseaux noirs; L'Autre; Les Meubles, preface by Jean-Luc Wauthier, new edition (box set) by Samsa / Académie royale de langue et de littérature françaises de Belgique, Brussels, 2015

=== Essays ===
- L'Impromptu du Pont d'Oye: avec Pierre Nothomb (Oye Bridge Impromptu: with Pierre Nothomb), a collaboration with Roger Bodart, Éditions de la Dryade, Vieux-Virton, 1965
- Marcel Lecomte, poète surréaliste (Marcel Lecomte, surrealist poet), presentation and curation of texts, in the collection "Poets of Today" from éditions Seghers, Paris, 1970
- Tolstoï (Tolstoy), in the collection "Classics of the 20th Century" from Éditions Universitaires, Paris, 1971. New edition: Léon Tolstoï (Leo Tolstoy), foreword by Florence Richter, in the collection "Literary History" from Le Cri and Académie royale de Langue et de Littérature françaises de Belgique, Brussels, 2010

=== Plays ===
- Et Adam répondit (And Adam Answered) – Unpublished, premiered at the Royal Park Theatre on 28 March 1947, directed by Oscar Lejeune.
- Le Combat n'est pas sur la mer (The War is Not at Sea) – premiered at the Royal Park Theatre, 1947 (radio adaptation)
- Le Monde éclatera demain (The World Will Fall Apart Tomorrow) – premiered at the Royal Park Theatre 16 May 1952, directed by Marcel Raine, published by édition Samsa, Brussels, 2023
