= Andrée Sodenkamp =

Belgian poet

Maud Andrée Sodenkamp
- Born: June 18, 1906; Saint-Josse-ten-Noode
- Died: January 27, 2004 (aged 97); Walhain
- Occupation: Poet
- Writing career
- Language: French

Maud Andrée Sodenkamp, born in Saint-Josse-ten-Noode on June 18, 1906, and died in Walhain on January 27, 2004, was a Belgian poet who wrote in French. She worked as an inspector of public libraries.

== Biography ==
=== Family ===
Her father, Henri Sodenkamp, a Dutchman from a family of officers, was a lieutenant-colonel in the army of King William I of the Netherlands. He was also an editor of a magazine called Chasse et pêche and an expert at dog shows. Her mother, Blanche-Henriette Leurs, was Belgian and 30 years younger than her husband. Her father died in 1913, and her mother committed suicide the same year when Andrée was only six. She was taken in by her maternal grandparents who ran a small grocery store in Schaerbeek. Although her uncle, a staff officer, became her legal guardian, he was killed in October 1918 during the final German offensive. Andrée was thus considered a "war orphan." She lived with her grandparents until she was 29. Her grandfather died in 1923, and her grandmother in 1935. Andrée Sodenkamp married Camille Victor Ghislain Libotte, a farmer, in 1938.

=== Education ===
From a young age, she wrote and read extensively, which earned her a score of 96 out of 100 for one of her compositions. She studied to become a teacher in Forest. In 1923, she obtained her teaching certificate and continued her studies to become a literature teacher.

=== Career ===
She started teaching at the municipal school in Schaerbeek. Later, she was appointed to the primary section of the state high school in La Louvière. In October 1936, she was assigned as a literature teacher at the State Athenaeum in Gembloux, responsible for history, geography, and French literature courses. She remained there until 1959. In 1959, she became an inspector of public libraries, appointed by Minister of National Education Charles Moureaux. She oversaw nearly 300 libraries until 1971.

=== Poetic Work ===
At forty-four, she published her first poems, encouraged by her former teacher Émilie Noulet, aligning with a classical tradition focused on perfect form. Her references were Mallarmé and Valéry. Émilie Noulet wrote about her, "The poetic gift is like it’s on the surface of the skin, on the surface of the verses. Its mere presence overturns all theories about voluntary art and monitored inspiration". Marcel Thiry commented, "Andrée Sodenkamp's alexandrine moves with the step of gods, the royal step of the 'Women of long mornings'".

However, Sodenkamp's temperament, inclined to reject all formal and poetic constraints, aligned her more with Colette and the Countess of Noailles. She gradually abandoned the alexandrine for free verse in her collection C’est au feu que je pardonne. Regardless of the form (classical, free verse, or prose), her contemporaries praised the musicality of her verses. Jacques De Decker wrote, "What a pleasure to be lulled by one of the most harmonious voices in our poetry! Andrée Sodenkamp instinctively has the sense of the best-cadenced verse, the surest rhythms. Her strength lies precisely in this naturalness".

Throughout her 41 years of publication, she tackled several themes, including history and art history of prestigious past civilizations, simple and wild impulses, love, and the intimacy of the couple, and natural phenomena. Her early collections were inspired by her life as a woman, love, celebration, the desire to exist, and the passage of time. Despite addressing life's brevity, she embraced life's vigor in her poems. She also wrote powerful poems about the horrors of war and combined rationalism with intuitive intelligence on subjects like astrophysics. An atheist, she did not shy away from the mystical and ontological questions. Norge noted this in her collection C’est au feu que je pardonne.

Many critics wrote about her, including Louis Daubier, Jean Tordeur, Jacques De Decker (Le Soir), Luc Norin, M.-L. Bernard-Verant (La Libre Belgique), Francine Ghysen (Femmes d’Aujourd’hui), André Gascht, Luc Bérimont (Le Figaro Littéraire).

=== Literary Circle ===
Maurice Carême read her poems and introduced Andrée Sodenkamp to a circle of poets, including Anne-Marie Kegels, Lucienne Desnoues, Jean Mogin, Charles Vildrac, Henri Clouard, Pierre della Faille, Jeanine Moulin, Marie-Claire d'Orbaix, Sophie Deroisin, Marianne Pierson-Piérart, Marcel Thiry, Albert Ayguesparse, André Gascht, Edmond Vandercammen, Andrée Chedid, Gisèle Prassinos, René Ménard, and Anise Koltz.

== Works ==
=== Poetry ===
- Des oiseaux à tes lèvres, Charleroi, Paule Héraly, 1950.
- Sainte terre, Paris, Librairie des Lettres, 1954. (preface by Maurice Carême).
- Les Dieux obscurs, Brussels, Éd. des Artistes, 1958.
- Femmes des longs matins, Brussels, André De Rache, 1965, 2nd ed. 1969.
- Et l'amour brûle (1972): Bilingual anthology of poems by Andrée Sodenkamp
- La Fête debout, Brussels, André De Rache, 1973.
- Autour de moi-même, Brussels, André De Rache, 1976.
- Choix, Anthology, André De Rache, 1980, 2nd ed. 1981.
- C'est au feu que je pardonne, Brussels, André De Rache, 1984.
- C'était une nuit comme une autre, Amay, L’Arbre à Paroles, 1991.
- Poèmes, Le Cri, Brussels, 1991.
- Andrée Sodenkamp, Poèmes choisis, portrait by Carl Norac, preface by Liliane Wouters, Académie royale de langue et de littérature françaises de Belgique, collection Poésie théâtre roman, 1998.

=== Travel Impressions ===
- A rivederci Italia, Brussels, André De Rache, 1965.

== Literary Awards ==
She received numerous literary awards:

- Prix Renée-Vivien (awarded to a woman, French or foreign, who has published one or more volumes of verse) for Sainte Terre in 1954
- Prix de la Province de Brabant in 1958 for Les Dieux obscurs
- Triennial Prize for Literature in 1968 for Femmes des longs matins
- Prix Desbordes-Valmore in 1970
- Prix Van Lerberghe in 1972 for Femmes des longs matins
- Prix Louise-Labé
- Prix Auguste-Beernaert of the Royal Academy in 1982
- Prix des Amitiés françaises in 1984 for Choix
- Grand Prize of the SABAM in 1984 for C'est au feu que je pardonne

=== Tribute ===
The library in Gembloux was named Bibliothèque Andrée-Sodenkamp in her honor, and she was a distinguished citizen of the town.

== Bibliography ==
- Association des écrivains belges de la langue française: Répertoire 2002, Hamme-ville, éd. de la page, 2002
- Anne-Marie Carlier, Andrée Sodenkamp: poète 1906-2004, éd. Chez l’auteur, 2004
- Jacques Charpentreau, Dictionnaire de la poésie française, Paris, éd. Fayard, 2006
- Georges-Emmanuel Clancier, Écrivains célèbres, Paris, éd. D’art Lucien Mazenod, 1965
- Henri Clouard, Histoire de la littérature française, éd. Albin Michel, 1954–1955
- Jean Dubray et Didier, Dictionnaire universel des littératures, Paris, éd. PUF, 1994
- Pierre Gamarra, Poètes contemporains, Paris, éd. Seghers, 1973
- Marcel Lobet, Les Poètes d’aujourd’hui, éd. Pierre Seghers, Paris, 1967
- Paul André, Nos poètes: de Pierre Loti à Andrée Sodenkamp, éd. M-C d'Orbaix, 1976
- Jean-Baptiste Baronian, Dictionnaire des écrivains belges, Bruxelles, éd. Le cri, 1988
