= Lilar =

Lilar is a Flemish surname. Notable people with the surname include:

- Albert Lilar (1900–1976), Belgian politician
- Françoise Lilar, pen name of Françoise Mallet-Joris (1930–2016), Belgian author
- Suzanne Lilar (1901–1992), Belgian author
