= Jacques Crickillon =

Belgian writer and poet (1940–2021)

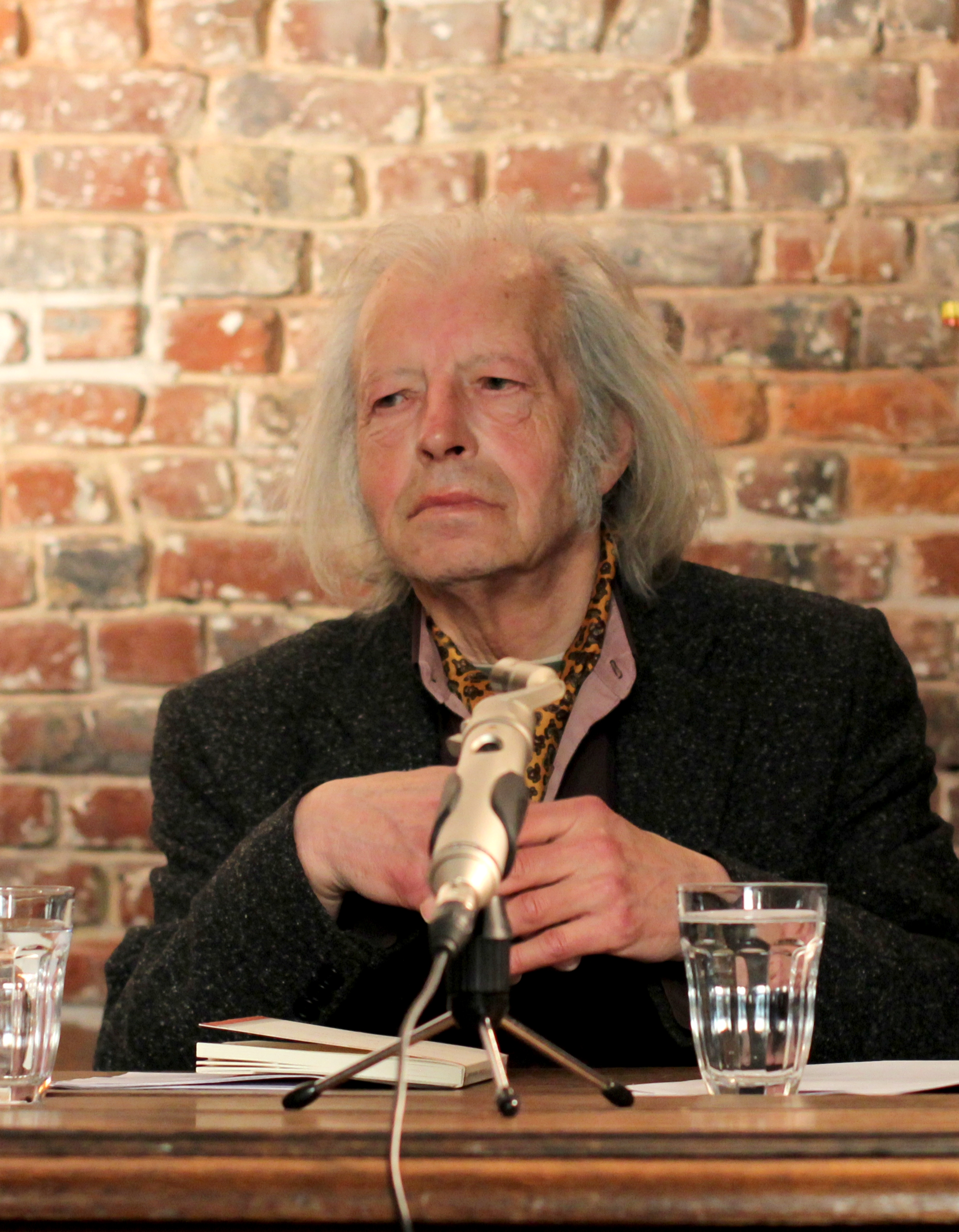
- Born: 13 September 1940; Brussels, Belgium
- Died: 11 February 2021 (aged 80)
- Occupation: Writer

Jacques Crickillon (13 September 1940 – 11 February 2021) was a Belgian novelist, poet and essayist. He was sometimes known under the pseudonym Frank Paradis.

== Biography ==
Crickillon studied Romanesque philology at the Université libre de Bruxelles. He had a vast knowledge of the history and arts of Africa and East Asia, which he applied while teaching at the Athénée communal Fernand Blum for many years.

Crickillon won numerous awards for his poetry and other works, such as the Prix Victor-Rossel in 1980, a Golden Palm at International Francophonie Day in Nice, and the Prix Alix Charlier-Anciaux of the Académie royale de langue et de littérature françaises de Belgique in 1984. His works were studied by great critics such as Jacques De Decker, Alain Bousquet, and Christophe Van Rossom. He also wrote theatrical pieces and radio shows, such as Sommeil blanc and Le Cri de Tarzan, as well as young adult novels.

Crickillon was elected to the Académie royale de langue et de littérature françaises de Belgique on 17 April 1993, taking the place of Marcel Lobet. Jacques-Gérard Linze spoke at his reception on 26 February 1994.

Jacques Crickillon died on 11 February 2021 at the age of 80.

== Bibliography ==
- La Défendue (1968)
- L'œuvre romanesque d'Albert Ayguesparse (1970)
- L'Ombre du Prince (1971)
- La Barrière blanche (1974)
- La Guerre sainte (1975)
- À visage fermé (1976)
- André Miguel (1977)
- Raymond Chasle L'Île-Étoile (1978)
- Régions insoumises, poésie (1978)
- Région interdite (1978)
- «Approche de Tao» (1979)
- «Cinq Récits» (1980)
- Supra-Coronada (1980)
- Colonie de la Mémoire (1980)
- Nuit la Neige (1981)
- Retour à Tawani (1983)
- Parcours 109 (1983)
- La Nuit du Seigneur (1984)
- L'Indien de la Gare du Nord (1985)
- Le Tireur birman (1987)
- Grand Paradis (1988)
- Sphère (1991)
- Les Oreilles-Coquillages (1991)
- Neuf Royaumes (1991)
- Enfant avec cravate et peintures de guerre (1992)
- Vide et Voyageur (1993)
- Ténébrées (1993)
- Contes de la plume et du papier (1993)
- Ode à Lorna Lherne (1994)
- Élégies d'Évolène (1995)
- Talisman, poésie (1995)
- Ballade de Lorna de l'Our (1996)
- L'Astrolabe (1997)
- Au bord des Fonderies mortes (1998)
- Oberland, Montagne romantique, suivi d'Engadine et Montagne symboliste (2000)
- La Chanson de Nana Sumatra (2001)
- Cercle Afanema (La Défendue, L'Ombre du Prince, La Barrière blanche, La Guerre sainte, À Visage fermé) (2001)
- Babylone Demain, suivi de Le Tueur birman, Parcours 109 et Supra-Coronada (2001)
- A Kénalon I (2004)
- A Kénalon II (2005)
- Le Bois de pluie (2006)
- A Kénalon I et II (2006)
- Phase Terminale (2010)
