= Dominique Celis =

Belgian writer

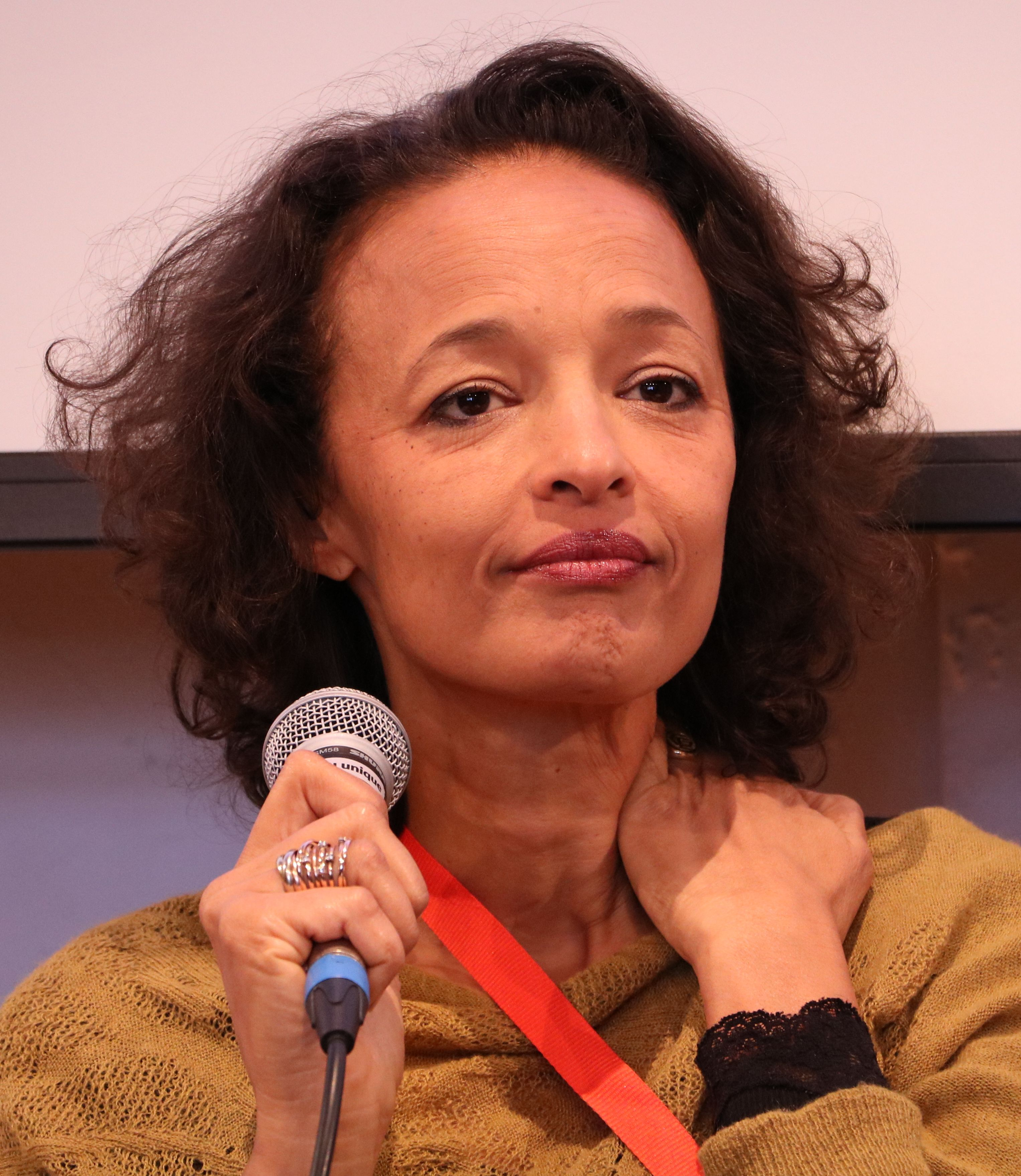
- Born: 1978; Burundi
- Alma mater: University of Liège
- Occupation: Writer

Dominique Celis (born 1978) is a Belgian writer. Her debut novel Ainsi pleurent nos hommes ("So Our Men Cry", 2022) is about the Rwandan genocide.

Dominique Celis was born in 1978 in Burundi to a Belgian father and Rwandan mother. She lived in Rwanda and Zaire before her family settled in Belgium in 1986. She graduated from the University of Liège with a master's degree in philosophy and taught ethics at the high school level. She moved to Kigali in 2013.

In 2019, she was awarded a Francophone Afriques-Haïti residency to work on her debut novel, which was then called Lettres sur un retour au pays maternelle ("Letters on a Return to My Motherland"). The epistolary novel is a series of letters from Erika, who fled the genocide and has returned to Rwanda, to her sister Lawurensiya, who stayed in Belgium. The novel was a finalist for the 2022 Prix Rossel and was longlisted for the 2022 Prix Méduse.
