= Prix Victor-Rossel =

Belgian literary award

The Prix Victor-Rossel is a literary award in Belgium that was first awarded in 1938. The award was created by three people associated with the newspaper Le Soir: the owner Marie-Thérèse Rossel, the manager Lucien Fuss and the editor-in-chief, Charles Breisdorff.

The name commemorates Victor Rossel, the son of Emile Rossel, the paper's founder. The prize was not awarded from 1940 to 1945 during the German occupation of Belgium.

== List of Winners ==
- 1938 – Marguerite Guyaux, Bollèche
- 1939 – Madeleine Ley, Le Grand Feu
- 1946 – Max Defleur, Le Ranchaud
- 1947 – Maurice Carême, Contes pour Caprine
- 1948 – Nelly Kristink, Le Renard à l'anneau d'or
- 1949 – Jean Welle, Le bonheur est pour demain...
- 1950 – André Villers, La Griffe du léopard
- 1951 – Daniel Gillès, Mort la douce
- 1952 – Albert Ayguesparse, Notre ombre nous précède
- 1953 – Paul-Aloïse De Bock, Terres basses
- 1954 – Jacqueline de Boulle, Le Desperado
- 1955 – Lucien Marchal, La Chute du grand Chimu
- 1956 – Stanislas d'Otremont, L'Amour déraisonnable
- 1957 – Edmond Kinds, Les Ornières de l'été
- 1958 – Stéphane Jourat, Entends, ma chère, entends
- 1959 – Jacqueline Harpman, Brève Arcadie
- 1960 – Victor Misrahi, Les Routes du Nord
- 1961 – David Scheinert, Le Flamand aux longues oreilles
- 1962 – Maud Frère, Les Jumeaux millénaires
- 1963 – Charles Bertin, Le Bel Âge
- 1964 – Louis Dubrau, À la poursuite de Sandra
- 1965 – Jacques Henrard, L'Écluse de novembre
- 1966 – Eugénie De Keyser, La Surface de l'eau
- 1967 – Marie Denis, L'Odeur du père
- 1968 – Charles Paron, Les vagues peuvent mourir
- 1969 – Franz Weyergans, L'Opération
- 1970 – Pierre Mertens, L'Inde ou l'Amérique
- 1971 – Renée Brock, L'Étranger intime
- 1972 – Irène Stecyk, Une petite femme aux yeux bleus
- 1973 – Georges Thinès, Le Tramway des officiers
- 1974 – André-Marcel Adamek, Le Fusil à pétales
- 1975 – Sophie Deroisin, Les Dames
- 1976 – Gabriel Deblander, L'Oiseau sous la chemise
- 1977 – Vera Feyder, La Derelitta
- 1978 – Gaston Compère, Portrait d'un roi dépossédé
- 1979 – Jean Muno, Histoires singulières
- 1980 – Jacques Crickillon, Supra-Coronada
- 1981 – François Weyergans, Macaire le Copte
- 1982 – Raymond Ceuppens, L'Été pourri
- 1983 – Guy Vaes, L'Envers
- 1984 – Jean-Pierre Hubin, En lisière
- 1985 – Thierry Haumont, Le Conservateur des ombres
- 1986 – Jean-Claude Pirotte, Un été dans la combe
- 1987 – René Swennen, Les Trois Frères
- 1988 – Michel Lambert, Une vie d'oiseau
- 1989 – Jean Claude Bologne, La Faute des femmes
- 1990 – Philippe Blasband, De cendres et de fumées
- 1991 – Anne François, Nu-Tête
- 1992 – Jean-Luc Outers, Corps de métier
- 1993 – Nicole Malinconi, Nous deux
- 1994 – Alain Bosquet de Thoran, La Petite Place à côté du théâtre
- 1995 – Patrick Roegiers, Hémisphère nord
- 1996 – Caroline Lamarche, Le Jour du chien
- 1997 – Henry Bauchau, Antigone; Jean-Philippe Toussaint, La Télévision
- 1998 – François Emmanuel, La Passion Savinsen
- 1999 – Daniel De Bruycker, Silex. La tombe du chasseur
- 2000 – Laurent de Graeve, Le Mauvais Genre
- 2001 – Thomas Gunzig, Mort d'un parfait bilingue
- 2002 – Xavier Deutsch, La Belle Étoile
- 2003 – Ariane Le Fort, Beau-fils
- 2004 – Isabelle Spaak, Ça ne se fait pas
- 2005 – Patrick Delperdange, Chants des gorges
- 2006 – Guy Goffette, Une enfance lingère
- 2007 – Diane Meur, Les Vivants et les Ombres
- 2008 – Bernard Quiriny, Contes carnivores
- 2009 – Serge Delaive, Argentine
- 2010 – Caroline De Mulder, Ego Tango
- 2011 – Geneviève Damas, Si tu passes la rivière
- 2012 – Patrick Declerck, Démons me turlupinant
- 2013 - Alain Berenboom, Monsieur Optimiste
- 2014 - Hedwige Jeanmart, Blanès
- 2015 - Eugène Savitzkaya, Fraudeur
- 2016 - Hubert Antoine, Danse de la vie brève
- 2017 - Laurent Demoulin, Robinson
- 2018 – Adeline Dieudonné, La Vraie Vie
- 2019 – Vinciane Moeschler, Trois incendies
- 2020 – Catherine Barreau, La Confiture de morts
- 2021 – Philippe Marczewski, Un corps tropical
- 2022 – Stéphane Lambert, L'Apocalypse heureuse
- 2023 – Antoine Wauters, Le Plus Court Chemin
- 2024 – Velibor Čolić, Guerre et pluie
- 2025 – Claire Huynen, Les femmes de Louxor
