= Stecyk =

Surname list

Stecyk is a Polish-language surname. The word is a diminutive of the given name Stefan. Notable people with this surname include:

- C.R. Stecyk III (born in 1950), American artist and photojournalist
- Irène Stecyk (born in 1937), Belgian writer and poet
- Władysław Stecyk (born in 1951), Polish wrestler
