= Philippe Denis =

French poet (1947–2021)

- Born: 17 January 1947; Bordeaux, France
- Died: 8 November 2021 (aged 74); Viana do Castelo, Portugal
- Occupations: Poet and translator
- Writing career
- Notable works: Cahier d'ombres (1974); Nugae (1989).

Philippe Denis (17 January 1947 in Bordeaux, France – 8 November 2021 in Viana do Castelo in Portugal), was a French poet, essayist, and translator.

== Biography ==
Philippe Denis authored several books of poetry and essays, as well as translations from both English and Japanese. He had contributed work to numerous French-language journals: L'Éphémère, Argile, Clivages, NRF, Critique, Les Cahiers du Sud, La Revue de Belles-Lettres, Po&sie, Limon, Banana Split, L'Ire des Vents and La Thirteenth.; as well as internationally: New Direction, Chicago Review, M(odern) P(oetry) in T(ranslation), Origin, Triquarterly Review, Poetry Now, Mundus Artium (United States and Great Britain), Park ( Berlin), Nuovi Argomenti (Rome), Edebiyat Çeviri Dergisi (Ankara).

He was a Fulbright Visiting Lecturer (University of Minnesota) a then Member of the Faculty of Bennington College (Vermont); in addition, Denis had been a lecturer in Turkey at the University of Uludağ (Bursa) and Çukurova (Adana), as well as the university from Coimbra (Portugal).

In 1978 he participated in the International Writing Program at the University of Iowa.

He had lived abroad for more than thirty years.

=== Translations into French ===
- Unearth (poèmes de Paul Auster; lithographies de J-P. Riopelle), Maeght, 1980
- Poèmes d'Emily Dickinson précédé de Amherst 1980, Le Voleur de talan, 1980
- Notes sur des pivoines, Masaoka Shiki (traduction établie avec le concours de Kanako Yoshida; l'édition de tête comporte une calligraphie de Noriko Kobayashi), Thierry Bouchard, 1984
- ...au sommet d'une tour arasée, (E. Dickinson, M. Moore, S. Plath et Laura R. Jackson), Passage, 1986
- Quarante-sept poèmes d'Emily Dickinson, La Dogana, 1987
- En Poussière honorée, poèmes d'Emily Dickinson, La Ligne d'ombre, 2013
- Cent dix sept poèmes d'Emily Dickinson, La Dogana, 2020

=== Works translated into English ===
- Notebook of shadows (selected poems 1974–1980), translated by Mark Irwin, afterword by Paul Auster, The Globe Press, Cleveland, New York, 1980
- Origin, Fourth series, featuring Philippe Denis, Boston, Mass., January 1980
- Nugæ, translated by Cid Corman, Longhouse publisher, Green River, Vermont, 2001
