= Paul-Aloïse De Bock =

Belgian lawyer and writer

Paul-Aloïse De Bock (13 September 1898 in Schaerbeek - 28 April 1986 in Watermael-Boitsfort) was a French-speaking Belgian lawyer and writer.

De Bock won the Prix Victor-Rossel in 1953 for the collection of short stories Terres basses.

== Works ==
- Terres basses, 1953
- L'Antichambre, 1954
- L'Écume et le Soc, 1954
- Les Mains dans le vide, 1955
- Litanies pour des gisants, 1956
- Le Monologue conjugal, 1957
- Les Chemins de Rome, 1961
- Paul Delvaux, l'homme, le peintre, 1967
- Le Sucre filé, 1976
- Le Pénitent, 1981

=== Further reading ===
- Paul Delsemme (2004). Les Écrivains francs-maçons de Belgique (PDF) (in French). Brussels: Bibliothèques de l'université libre de Bruxelles. pp. 282–291.
- "Paul-Aloïse De Bock". le site de l'Académie royale de langue et de littérature françaises de Belgique (in French).
