= Hilda Ram =

Flemish writer (1858–1901)

Mathilda Ramboux
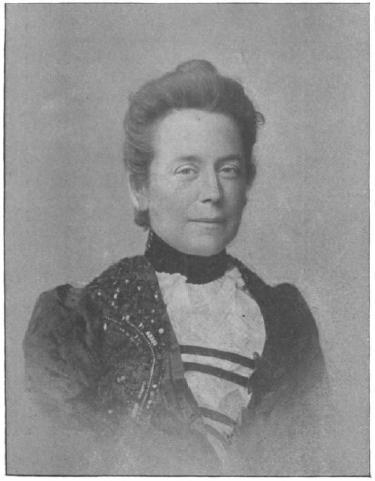
- Born: Maria Mathilda Ramboux; 31 October 1858; Antwerp, Belgium
- Died: 12 July 1901 (aged 42); Antwerp, Belgium
- Writing career
- Pen name: Hilda Ram
- Genres: poetry, short story

Hilda Ram, the pen name of Maria Mathilda Ramboux (31 October 1858 – 12 July 1901) was a Flemish writer. She was active in the Flemish Movement and the Catholic feminist movement.

She was born in Antwerp. She studied at the normal school in Onze-Lieve-Vrouw-Waver and subsequently spent a year in England learning English. On her return to Belgium, she taught for a time but was more interested in writing than teaching.

Her first collection of poetry Een Klaverken uit ’s Levens Akker was published in 1884. Her 1890 collection of poems Gedichten was awarded the Staatsprijs voor Poezie.

In 1885, she met Marie-Elisabeth Belpaire; together, they published Wonderland, a series of collections of short stories and fairy tales. In 1897, together they established the Extension universitaire pour les femmes, a set of university-level courses for women. In 1899, they established the Constance-Teichmannkring ("Constance Teichmann circle"), with the aim of promoting the use of Flemish and bettering children's literature. They also established the literary magazine Dietsche Warande and Het Belfort[ and she served on its first editorial committee.

She wrote the libretto for Edgar Tinel's opera Godelieve.

She was named a Knight in the Order of Leopold.

She died from cancer in Antwerp at the age of 42.
