= Riopelle =

Riopelle is a surname. Notable people with the surname include:

- Howard Riopelle (1922–2013), Canadian ice-hockey player
- Jean-Paul Riopelle (1923–2002), Canadian painter and sculptor
- Jerry Riopelle (1941–2018), American musician and record producer

== Other uses ==
- Le Riopelle de l'Isle – Triple-cream cheese from Quebec

== See also ==
- Riopel
