= Riopel =

Riopel is a surname. Notable people with the surname include:

- Hop Riopel (1900–1966), American athlete and coach
- Louis-Joseph Riopel (1841–1915), lawyer, notary, and political figure in Quebec
- Nicola Riopel (born 1989), Canadian former professional ice hockey goaltender
- Sipho Sibiya Riopel (known as Sipho Sibiya; born 1971), South Africa soccer player
- Vanessa Riopel (born 1990), Canadian baseball player

== See also ==
- Riopelle
