= Caroline Lamarche =

French-speaking writer (born 1955)

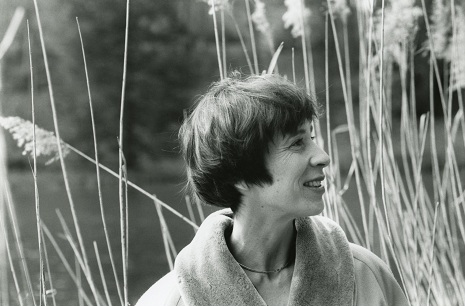
- Caroline Lamarche (shot by Marie-Françoise Plissart)
- Born: 3 March 1955 (age 71); Liège, Belgium
- Occupation: writer

Caroline Lamarche (French pronunciation: [kaʁɔlin lamaʁʃ]; born 3 March 1955) is a French-speaking writer. She was born in Liège and spent her early childhood in Spain and her later childhood near Paris. With a degree in Romance languages, she taught in Liège and in Nigeria. As of 2008, she lives on the outskirts of Brussels.

== Body of work ==
She has had six novels published by publishers Les Éditions de Minuit and later Éditions Gallimard. She has published poetry, including the French half of the French-Dutch bilingual book Entre-deux / Twee vrouwen van twee kanten (with Hilde Keteleer, published by Fram), and further short stories including J'ai cent ans (published by Le Serpent à Plumes). She has also produced for-radio works for France-Culture and for Belgian radio, and scripts for plays (Théâtre du Festin, Montluçon, Paris).

Her main works since the turn of the 21st century have been Carnets d'une soumise de province ("Notes from a submissive country girl"), Voies Libres ("Free Paths"), with photographer Christian Carez (published by MET), the novel Karl et Lola and the illustrated story La Barbière as well as a children's book Le Phoque (éd. du Rouergue, 2008).

== Works (selection) ==
- Le Jour du chien, Minuit, Prix Rossel (1996)
- La nuit l'après-midi, Minuit (1998). Translated to English as Night in the Afternoon. trans. Howard Curtis, Grove Press (2000)
- J'ai cent ans, nouvelles, Le Serpent à Plumes (1999), rééd. Le Rocher/Le Serpent à Plumes (2006)
- L'ours, Gallimard (2000)
- Lettres du pays froid, Gallimard (2003)
- Carnets d'une soumise de province, Folio Gallimard (2004)
- Karl et Lola, Gallimard (2007)
- La Barbière, Les Impressions Nouvelles (2007)
- Mons, photos de Marie-Françoise Plissart, Les Impressions Nouvelles (2009)
- Liège-Guillemins. La gare blanche, photos de Alain Janssens. Mardaga / Eurogare (2010)
- La Chienne de Naha, Gallimard (2012)
- La Mémoire de l’air, Gallimard, 2014. Translated to English as "The Memory of the Air", Heloise Press 2022
- Dans la maison un grand cerf, Gallimard 2017
- L’Asturienne, Les Impressions nouvelles, 2021
- La Fin des abeilles, Gallimard, 2022
- Cher instant je te vois, Verdier, 2024
- Le Bel Obscur, Seuil, 2025

== Awards ==
For her early short stories, she was awarded the Prix Radio France Internationale and the Prix de la Fureur de Lire. Her first novel Le jour du chien was awarded the Prix Rossel.

For her radio piece L'autre langue ("The other language"), she received the "Prix SACD" at the Festival Phonurgia Nova, Arles 2003.

In 2025 her novel Le Bel Obscur was a finalist in the Prix Goncourt.
