= Eugénie De Keyser =

Belgian writer and art critic

Eugénie De Keyser (17 May 1918, Brussels - 4 April 2012) was a Belgian writer and art critic. She was professor emeritus at the University of Louvain (UCLouvain, Louvain-la-Neuve) and at Saint-Louis University, Brussels (Brussels), specializing in contemporary art and sculpture. She was a member of the Royal Academies for Science and the Arts of Belgium.

She wrote one of the books for Editions d'Art Albert Skira 10 volume series "Art, Ideas, History" titled "The Romantic West, 1789-1850". In 1966 she was awarded the Prix Rossel for her novel La surface de l'eau.
