= Carla Serena =

Belgian writer and explorer

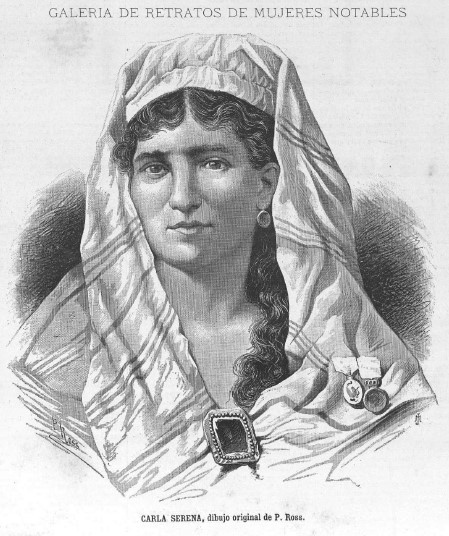
- Born: Caroline Hartog Morgensthein; 1820; Antwerp, Central Brabant, United Kingdom of the Netherlands
- Died: 1884 (aged 63–64); Athens, Kingdom of Greece
- Occupation: Writer

Carla Serena (1820, in Antwerp – 1884, in Athens) was a Belgian writer and explorer, best remembered for her geographical and cultural publications based on her travels. Her writings Lettres d'Autriche about the 1873 Vienna World's Fair were held in the personal library of Emperor Franz Joseph of Austria, while her Lettres Scandinaves collection of writings earned her a Litteris et Artibus medal from King Oscar II of Sweden.
