= Vera Feyder =

Belgian writer and comedian

- Born: 1939 (age 86–87); Liège, Liège Province, Belgium
- Occupations: Writer; comedian
- Writing career
- Notable awards: Prix Victor-Rossel (1977)

Vera Feyder (born 1939) is a Belgian writer and comedian living in France.

Her father was a Polish Jew who died while being sent to Auschwitz; her mother was Belgian of Serb descent. She was born in Liège and was educated at the Académie Grétry there. During her youth, she suffered from tuberculosis and anorexia, which required long periods of convalescence. At the age of 19, she moved to Paris.

She published her first collection of poems Le Temps démuni in 1961, which received the Prix "Découverte". Her first novel La Derelitta received the Prix Victor-Rossel; it was adapted into a film in 1981. In 2008, she was awarded the Prix poésie Paul Verlaine de l’Académie française for her work.

Feyder wrote scripts for dramas and literary programs for France Culture, the Radio Suisse Romande and the RTBF. In 1985, she was awarded the Prix Radio de la SACD for her work. From 1999 to 2002, Feyder was vice-president of the Commission Radio de la SACD.

== Awards ==
- Prix "Découverte"
- Prix Victor-Rossel
- Prix poésie Paul Verlaine de l’Académie française
- Prix Radio de la SACD

== Selected works ==
- Un jaspe pour Liza, novella (1965)
- Pays l'absence, poetry (1970), received the Prix François Villon
- Passionnaire, poetry (1974), received the Prix Broquette-Gonin awarded by the Académie française
- Emballage perdu, play (1982), translated in English as No deposit, no return (1986)
- Le fond de l'être est froid. 1966-1992, poetry anthology (1995), received the Prix de poésie de la SGDL
- Petite suite de pertes irréparables, play (1998)
- La bouche de l'ogre, play (2002), received the Prix Littérature Amnesty
- Piano seul, play (2003), received the Prix Louis Praga
- Ô Humanité, stories (2008)
