= Le Riopelle de l'Isle =

Triple-cream cheese from Quebec

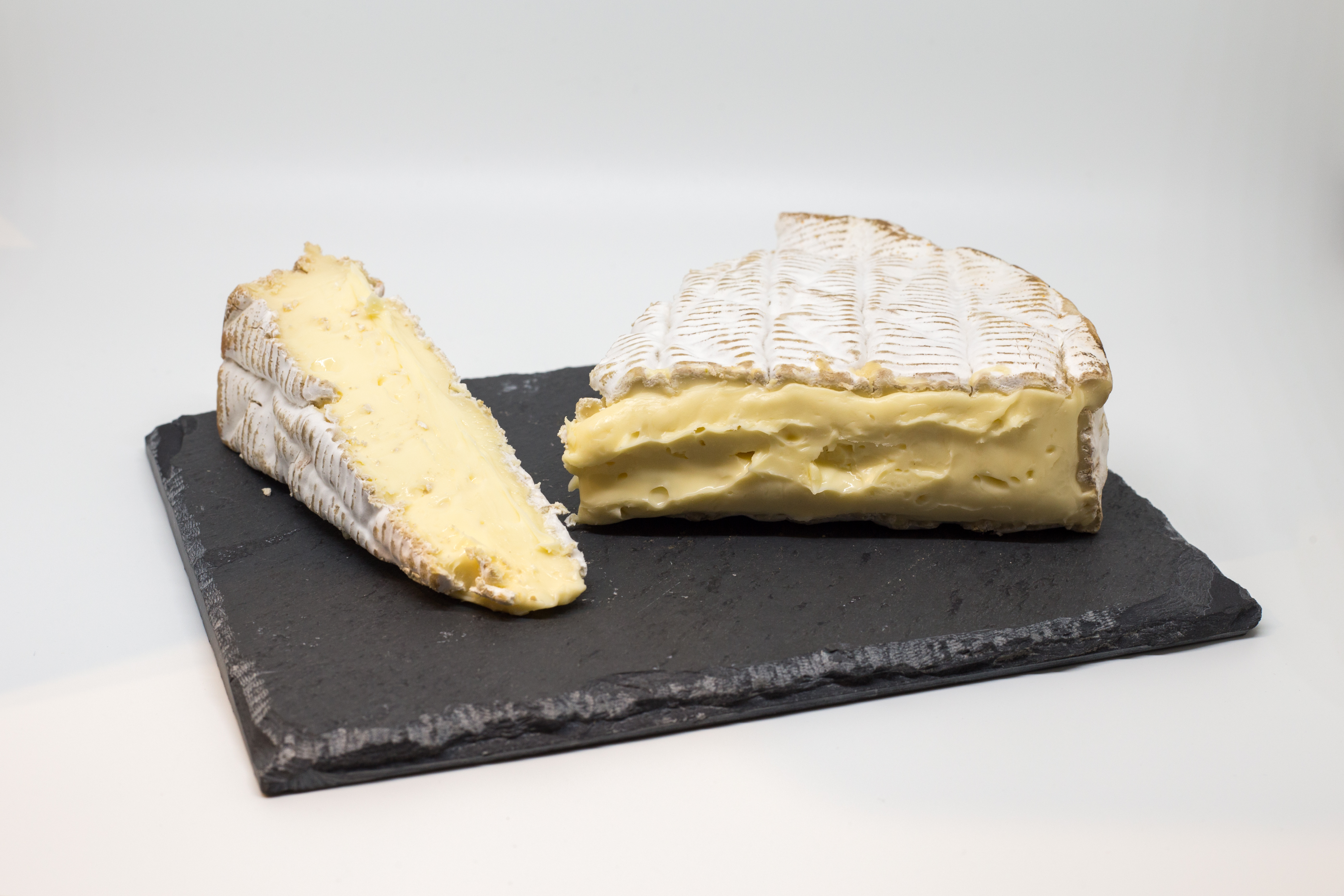
- Country of origin: Canada
- Region: Quebec
- Town: Chaudière-Appalaches
- Source of milk: Cow
- Texture: Soft
- Fat content: 35%
- Weight: 1.4 kg
- Aging time: 60 days

Le Riopelle de l'Isle is a triple-cream cheese from Quebec that has an oily and sometimes flowing texture known to melt in the mouth. It possesses a smooth buttery taste, with hints of hazelnuts and mushrooms.

It is named after Jean-Paul Riopelle, a renowned Québécois artist and painter, and for each 1.4 kg piece, $1 goes to a foundation that helps the children of Isle-aux-Grues, Quebec, Canada, the island where this cheese is manufactured, to get a higher education.

The label on Le Riopelle de l'Isle is a reproduction of one of Riopelle's paintings.

== More information ==
- Type: unpasteurized cows milk, soft paste, flowery crust
- Manufacturer: Fromagerie de l'Île-aux-Grues
- Size: 1.4 kg
- Fat content: 35%
- Humidity content: 50%

== See also ==
- List of cheeses
