= Élise Champagne =

Belgian writer and educator (1897–1983)

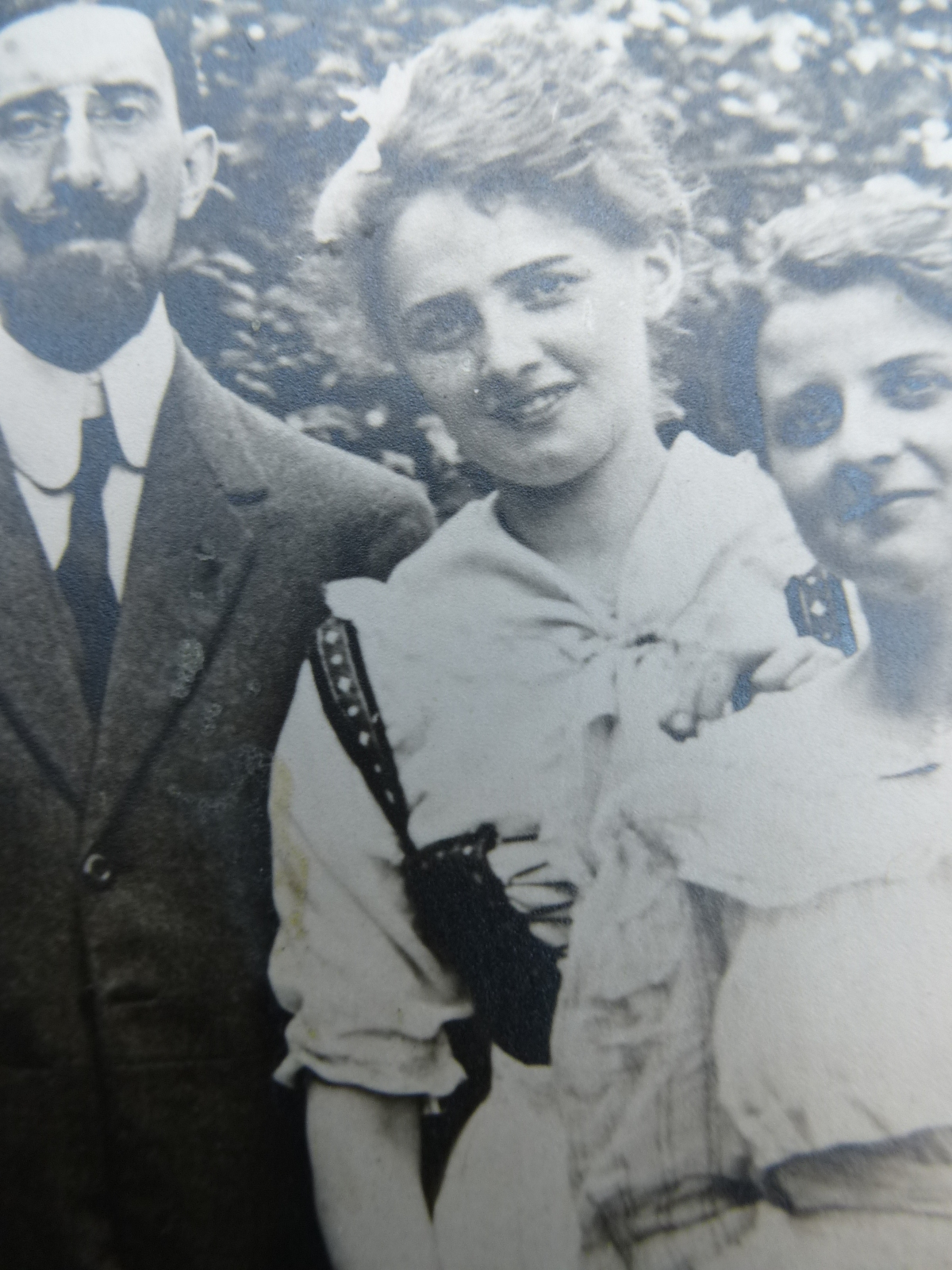
- Born: 14 August 1897; Liège, Belgium
- Died: 1983
- Writing career
- Pen name: Élise Clarens
- Genre: poetry

Élise Champagne (14 August 1897 – 1983) was a Belgian writer and educator. She wrote under the pen name Élise Clearens.

She was born in Liège. After her father suffered a debilitating accident, her mother was forced to support the family. Champagne earned a teaching certificate and, from 1918 to 1922, she taught at the primary school in Bressoux. She went on to earn a teaching diploma from the normal school at Liège. In 1923, she began teaching French and literature at the Liège normal school; from 1947 to 1957, she was director of the school.

She was a member of the Belgian Labour Party. Champagne was provincial secretary for the feminist Femmes prévoyantes socialistes. She helped found the group "Les Intellectuels socialistes".

Beginning in 1921, she contributed literary criticism and theatre reviews to La Wallonie. She also contributed to L'Avant-Poste and Le Monde du Travail.

In 1923, she published her first collection of poetry Le Portail entr'ouvert. In 1928, she was awarded the Prix Emile Verhaeren. She lived with the painter Robert Crommelynck from 1934 to 1942. After she retired from teaching in 1957, she dedicated herself to writing. In 1973, she received the Prix Nayer for her work. Besides poetry, she also wrote short stories and plays, taking her inspiration from the lives of working-class people.

During World War II, she joined the Resistance and helped Jewish children. In 1946, she helped found the Soroptimist club of Liège.
