= Malika Madi =

Belgian writer (born 1967)

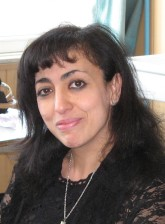
Malika Madi

Malika Madi (born 18 November 1967) is a Belgian novelist, living in La Louvière, Belgium.

== Early life and biography ==
Malika Madi was born in La Hestre, Hainaut province, Belgium. She is of Algerian descent. In Algeria, her father lived near Béjaïa, where he was a farmer and produced the olive oil. He emigrated to Belgium in 1960 to work as a miner.

The rest of Madi's family arrived in 1964, and she was born three years later. As a child, she discovered her passion for writing French. She wrote short stories before writing her first novel. When she finished her studies (she graduated in management), she married and had a child. In 2005 she published her first novel, Nuit d'encre pour Farah, which won the Best First work of the French Community of Belgium and named for the Prix des Lycéens (Belgium) in 2007.

Madi wrote a second book, "Les silences de Médéa" (Labor, 2007, Luc Pire 2006) which is currently being adapted to film. In 2008, she coauthored a book with Hassan Bousetta which addresses the issue of racism and prejudice, Je ne suis pas raciste mais...

She is still writing and runs youth writing workshops and lectures in libraries of the French Community. She has also visited school classes as part of the "Ecrivain en classe" project of the Service de la Promotion des Lettres.

Although there are similarities to the author, Nuit d'encre pour Farah is not autobiographical. Both Madi and the protagonist are of Algerian descent and enjoy reading.

== Nuit d'Encre pour Farah ==
The novel has a modern setting and describes an Algerian immigrant family in Belgium living in a small town. Farah, the protagonist, is the youngest of three children, all girls: Latifa, Lila, and Farah. Their parents try to teach the girls traditional roles, such as housework, sewing, and cooking. Latifa and Lila rebel and want more freedom. Farah avoids some of these obligations. Instead she reads and dreams of becoming a professor of literature. Latifa and Lila, upset with their situation, decide to run away. When their parents discover their intent, they prohibit Farah from taking an exam in French and instead require her to marry the man that Latifa was supposed to marry. She moves to Algeria with him.

One of the most discussed aspects of the novel is Farah's passivity on learning she was to marry. She did not get angry, perhaps because she was stunned by the sudden decision of her parents. On moving to Algeria, she loses all joy in life. This has been described as a commentary on Muslim women and cultural traditions. The author stresses this is not religion but tradition.

== Les silences de Médéa ==
The protagonist of Les silences de Médéa is a French teacher named Zohra. She works in a part of Algeria which has a great deal of Islamic extremism. She is gang raped at night, and flees to her native Paris. However through the strength of her step-daughter, a social worker named Hanna, Zohra returns to face her past.

== Bibliography ==
- Collectif des intellectuels maghrébins de Belgique (under the direction of Hassan Bousetta), Rompre le silence, Éditions Labor, Brussels, 2002, 161 p. ISBN 2-8040-1719-2
- Nuit d'encre pour Farah, Éditions du Cerisier, Cuesmes, 2000, ISBN 2-87267-043-2
- Belges sans en avoir l'air, Éditions Mémor, Brussels, 2003
- Les Silences de Médéa, Éditions Labor, Charleroi, 2003, ISBN 2-80401-821-0
- Amour, j'écris ton nom, 23 auteurs belges colorient leur plume, collectif, Editions Couleur livres, Charleroi, 2006, ISBN 2-84187-337-4
- Le jeu de la plume et du hasard, Éditions Memor (coll. Couleurs), Brussels, 2007
- Et le monde regarde, Liban été 2006, Éditions du Cerisier, Cuesmes, 2007
- (en collaboration avec Hassan Bousetta), Je ne suis pas raciste, mais..., Éditions Luc Pire, Brussels, 2008
- Chamsa, fille du soleil, Éditions du Cygne, Paris, 2010
