= Maud Frère =

Belgian writer (1923–1979)

- Born: October 10, 1923; Brussels, Belgium
- Died: October 17, 1979 (aged 56)
- Occupation: Writer
- Writing career
- Notable awards: Prix Victor-Rossel

Maud Frère (October 10, 1923 – October 17, 1979) was a Belgian writer.

== Biography ==
Maud Frère was born in Brussels, October 10, 1923. She began studying in an arts program, but switched to social studies after both her parents died in 1942. She worked as a social worker and then, in 1945, she married Edmund Frère, an engineer. She later began writing. Besides her novels, she also wrote for the Office de Radiodiffusion Télévision Française, as well as for various Belgian media. Frère also published a series of children's books featuring the character Véronique.

Frère's most noted work was produced between 1956 and 1972 and was published by the French publishing house Éditions Gallimard. Her novels mainly deal with the challenges in the lives of women in post-war Belgium. The plots of these novels do not move toward a definite conclusion; although the protagonist will take a new direction in her life, that direction has not yet been determined.

Later in life, she suffered from painful migraines which she treated with powerful analgesics. Frère died from a fall, October 17, 1979, at the age of 56.

== Awards ==
Frère was awarded the Prix Victor-Rossel, the Prix Charles Veillon and the Prix George-Garnir.

== Selected works ==
- Vacances secrètes (1956)
- L'herbe à moi (1957)
- La grenouille (1959), received the Prix Charles Veillon
- La délice (1961), was made into a 1974 film Isabelle devant le désir
- Les jumeaux millénaires (1962), received the Prix Victor-Rossel
- Guido (1965)
- Le temps d'une carte postale (1967)
- L'ange aveugle (1970)
- Des nuits aventureuses (1972)
