= Marguerite Baulu =

Belgian writer

Marguerite Baulu (1870, Brussels – 1942, Rambouillet) was a Belgian (French-language) novelist.

== Biography ==
Baulu founded the Œuvre des fêtes dans les hôpitaux in 1908. In 1926 she was awarded an award by the Syndicat des romanciers français.

== Bibliography ==
- L'Abbaye des dunes, Paris, Plon-Nourrit, 1914.
- Boulle et sa fille, Paris, Plon-Nourrit, 1925.
- Modeste automne, Paris, A. Leclerc, 1911.
- La bataille de l'Yser, republishes as La retraite d'Anvers et la bataille de l'Yser, foreword by Émile Vandervelde, Paris, Perrin & Cie, 1918.
