= Albert Lilar =

Belgian politician (1900–1976)

- Born: Albert Jean Julien François; 21 December 1900; Antwerp, Belgium
- Died: 16 March 1976 (aged 75)
- Occupations: politician, lawyer

Albert Jean Julien François, Baron Lilar (21 December 1900 – 16 March 1976) was a Belgian politician of the Liberal Party and a minister of justice.

== Early life ==
Lilar was a renowned lawyer of admiralty and International Private Law in Antwerp, and Chairman of the International Maritime Committee. He was also a professor of law at the Université libre de Bruxelles and the Vrije Universiteit Brussel.

== Career ==
In his political life, Lilar was a member of parliaments for the liberal party, senator of the Arrondissement Antwerp (1946–1971) and four times minister of justice (1946–1947, 1949–1950, 1954–1958 en 1960–1961). He became minister of state in 1969. Under the Gaston Eyskens government (1958–1960), Lilar was vice-premier of the cabinet.

As vice-premier, he was elected president of the Round Table in 1960 whose discussions lead to the independence of the Belgian Congo.

A humanitarian and defender of human rights, no death penalties were carried out under his terms as minister of justice.

== Personal life ==
He married in 1929 the writer Suzanne Lilar (née Vebist), and fathered 2 daughters : writer Françoise Mallet-Joris (1930–2016) and the 18th century art historian Marie Fredericq-Lilar (1934–2022).

== Legacy ==
The Albert Lilar Prize from the Comité Maritime International is awarded for a leading work on maritime law published in any language in the world during the previous five years.
