= Rolf Aggestam =

Swedish writer (1941–2020)

- Born: 21 December 1941; Stockholm, Sweden
- Died: 27 December 2020 (aged 79)
- Education: University of Lund
- Occupations: Poet, writer and translator
- Years active: 1973–2020

Rolf Aggestam (21 December 1941 – 27 December 2020) was a Swedish poet, writer and translator. Aggestam was born in Stockholm. His first poetry collection was published in 1973, Ditt hjärta är ett rött tåg. He made his debut as a prose writer in 1994. He drew his inspiration from Dylan Thomas and Walt Whitman. Aggestam translated the works of the latter.

Rolf Aggestam grew up in Nockeby in Bromma, but eventually moved to Näsåker in Ångermanland in the 1980s. He spend the summers at Viken, in the vicinity of Höganäs. His friends nicknamed him Roffe.

Aggestam studied at the University of Lund in the 1960s, where he earned his Bachelor of Arts degree, and then worked as a journalist in Malmö. He was an editor of the magazine Lyrikvännen in the years 1973–1977, and also an editor of the literary calendar Halifax with Katarina Frostenson from 1987 to 1996. Aggestam received several prizes for his poetry, among others: Sveriges Radios lyrikpris, Eyvind Johnson-priset and Gerard Bonniers lyrikpris.

During his lifetime, Aggestam was known first and foremost as a poet and translated poems by, among others, Matsuo Bashō and Walt Whitman, published respectively in 1974 and 1983.

The last poetry collection of Aggestam, Mitt i det veka livet, was published posthumously in 2021.

Rolf Aggestam was married to Annelie Fridell-Aggestam, she is also a writer. Together, they have three daughters.

== Bibliography ==
- 1973 – Ditt hjärta är ett rött tåg ISBN 91-46-11929-9
- 1975 – Glimmer ISBN 91-46-12359-8
- 1979 – Rost ISBN 91-46-13351-8
- 1980 – Häpp, hopp ISBN 91-46-13666-5
- 1986 – Med handen om pennan ISBN 91-46-15269-5
- 1989 – Between Darkness and Darkness: Selected Poems ISBN 0-915986-24-8
- 1992 – Foder ISBN 91-46-16117-1
- 1994 – Niagara! ISBN 91-46-16523-1
- 1998 – Att flå en blixt ISBN 91-46-17343-9
- 2003 – I detta ögonblick ISBN 91-46-17541-5
- 2009 – Död räkning ISBN 91-46-21967-6
- 2016 – Tattartrumpet ISBN 978-91-46-22947-6
- 2021 – Mitt i det veka livet ISBN 91-46-23715-1

== Awards ==
- 1986 – Sveriges Radios Lyrikpris
- 1994 – Beskowska resestipendiet
- 1995 – Eyvind Johnsonpriset
- 1997 – De Nios Vinterpris
- 1999 – Gerard Bonniers lyrikpris
- 2018 – Aspenströmpriset
- 2018 – Karl Vennbergs pris
