= Christophe Van Rossom =

Belgian speaker and writer

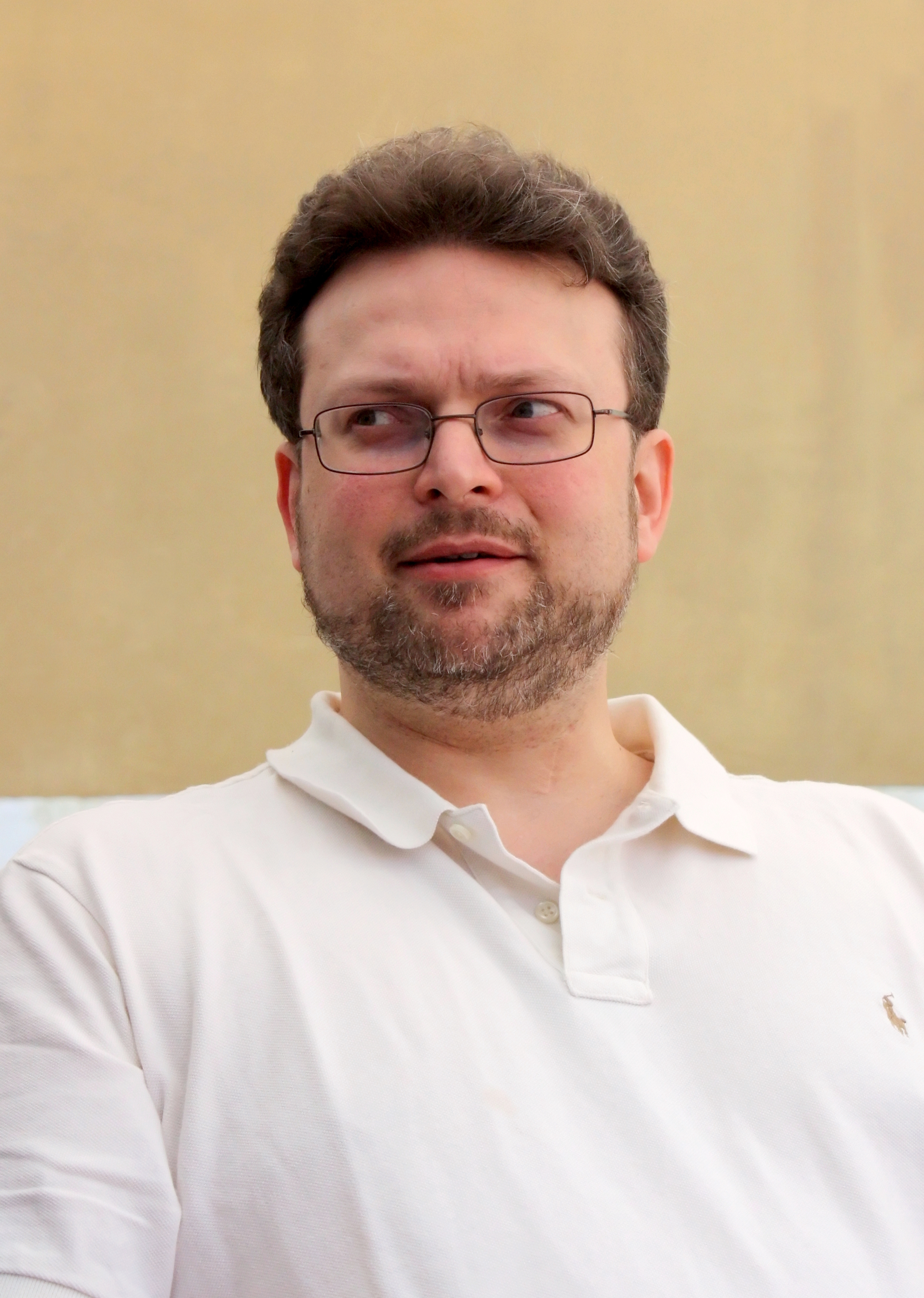
- Christophe Van Rossom in 2011.
- Born: Christophe Van Rossom; 21 April 1969; Brussels, Belgium
- Occupations: Poet, essayist, and professor of literature
- Website: christophevanrossom.net

Christophe Van Rossom (born April 21, 1969) is a speaker, author of numerous articles and studies, Belgian poet and essayist. He teaches at the Royal Conservatory of Brussels, School of Graphic Research and in the Université libre de Bruxelles.

== Works ==
- Mallarmé, facile ?, Éditions Renaissance du Livre, Collection Paroles d'Aube, 2002 ISBN 978-2-8046-0606-0
- À Voix haute, Éditions de l'Ambedui, Bruxelles, juin 2002 OCLC 717123671
- Jacques Crickillon : La vision et le souffle, Éditions Luce Wilquin, Collection L'œuvre en lumière, 2003 ISBN 978-2-88253-224-4
- Pour saluer le Comte de La Fère : (La leçon d'Athos), Éditions William Blake And Co, 2004 ISBN 978-2-84103-136-8
- Sous un ciel dévoyé, Éditions Cormier, 2005 ISBN 978-2-930231-54-9
- Marcel Moreau : L'insoumission et l'ivresse, Éditions William Blake And Co, 2005 ISBN 978-2-88253-262-6
- Jacques Cels, architecte du sens, Éditions Luce Wilquin, Collection L'œuvre en lumière, 2009 ISBN 978-2-88253-387-6
- Savoir de guerre, Éditions William Blake And Co, 2009 ISBN 978-2-84103-172-6
- Petit traité d'athéologie, Éditions Le Cadran ligné, 2010
- Le Rire de Démocrite, Éditions la Lettre volée, 2012, ISBN 978-2-87317-296-1
