= Caroline Gravière =

Belgian writer (1821–1878)

Caroline Gravière (real name Estelle Marie Louise Ruelens) (27 May 1821 – 20 March 1878) was a Belgian writer.

The daughter of a former notary from the village of Arquennes near Seneffe, she was born Estelle Marie Louise Crèvecœur in Brussels. Her mother, whose maiden name was Triponetty, was descended from Italian bankers who had come to Brussels during the 17th century. In 1848, she married Charles Ruelens, who became curator at the Royal Library of Belgium. She had six children, two of which died at a young age.

In 1864, she wrote her first novel Une histoire du pays under the name Michel Fleury. She contributed to various literary magazines, including the Revue trimestrielle and the Revue de Belgique using the name Caroline Gravière. She also published short stories and serialized novels in L'Étoile belge and La revue moderne. Her most successful novel was La Servante, published in 1872.
