= Louis Dubrau =

Belgian writer (1904–1997)

Louise Janson-Scheidt (19 November 1904 – 5 May 1997), known by her pen-name Louis Dubrau, was a Belgian writer.

== Biography ==
Louise Janson-Scheidt was born in Brussels, 19 November 1904. Her mother was Catherine Desmedt, a native of Belgium. Her father, a native of the Lorraine region of France, committed suicide when she was two years old. She was educated at the Sorbonne and the Collège de France in Paris. She published her first poem in 1934 in the literary magazine Le Thyrse under the name Louis Dubrau. She wrote under a masculine name to avoid any bias of the critics towards women; Dubrau was the name of her father's mother. In 1935, she married Fernand Janson.

She published the novel Zouzou in 1936, a collection of poems Présences in 1937 and a collection of short stories Louise in 1938. In 1939, she received the Prix Verhaeren for Abécédaire, collection of poetry. In 1940, she published a book of aphorisms Amour, délice et orgue. During World War II, she took part in the resistance against the German occupation and worked for the Red Cross. She was also president of the Union des femmes de Belgique. In 1950, she published Service de nuit about her experiences during the war.

After the war, she abandoned all political activity. She travelled extensively, visiting Israel, Africa, the Caribbean, Europe and the United States. Her travels inspired the following works:

- Ailleurs (poems) (1956)
- La fleur et le turban (stories) (1959)
- Les îles du Capricorne (story) (1967)

She died in Ixelles at the age of 92.

== Awards and honours ==
In 1963, she received the Prix Victor-Rossel for her novel À la poursuite de Sandra. In 1973, she was admitted to the L’Académie Royale de Langue et de Littérature Françaises de Belgique. In 1981, she received the Prix littéraire de la Communauté Française for her collection of stories Les imaginaires.
