= Jill Hoffman =

American poet and editor

- Education: Bennington College (BA); Columbia University (MA); Cornell University (PhD)
- Occupations: Poet; editor

Jill Hoffman is an American poet and editor.

She graduated from Bennington College with a B.A., from Columbia University with an M. A., and from Cornell University with a Ph.D. She taught at Bard College, Brooklyn College, Columbia University, and The New School.

She founded Mudfish, in 1984, and the Mudfish Individual Poet Series (Box Turtle Press). Her work appeared in New York Quarterly, Paris Review, and The New Yorker.

== Awards ==
- 1974 Guggenheim Fellowship

== Works ==
=== Poetry ===
- Mink Coat Holt, Rinehart and Winston, 1973, ISBN 978-0-03-010951-5
- black diaries, Box Turtle Press, 2000, ISBN 978-1-893654-02-0
- The Gates of Pearl, 2008/09

=== Novels ===
- Jilted, Simon & Schuster, 1993, ISBN 978-0-671-79518-4
- Topless
