= Jean Tordeur =

Belgian writer

- Born: 5 September 1920; Schaerbeek, Belgium
- Died: 27 January 2010 (aged 89)
- Occupation: writer

Jean Tordeur (French: [tɔʁdœr]; 5 September 1920 – 27 January 2010) was a Belgian writer writing in French. He was the cultural critic of the daily newspaper Le Soir (Brussels). Tordeur was a member of the Académie royale de langue et de littérature françaises de Belgique.

== Works ==
- Conservateur des charges et autre poèmes, Clepsydre, Éditions de la Différence.
- Foreword of A la recherche d'une enfance by Suzanne Lilar", 1979, Bruxelles, Éditions Jacques Antoine.
- Introduction to Journal de l'analogiste by Suzanne Lilar, 1979, Paris, Bernard Grasset, ISBN 2-246-00731-3
- Foreword of Écrit à Léglise by Maurice Grevisse, 1984, Neufchâteau, Lions club de Neufchâteau
- Foreword of Faux passeports by Charles Plisnier, 1984, Bruxelles, Éditions Jacques Antoine, ISBN 2-87132-000-4
- Portrait of author, Poèmes choisis by Jean Mogin, 1995, Bruxelles, Académie royale de langue et de littérature françaises, ISBN 2-8032-0013-9
- Foreword of Trois-quarts de siècle de lettres françaises en Belgique by Jacques Detemmerman et Jean Lacroix, 1995, avant-propos de Jean Tordeur, Brussel, Koninklijke Bibliotheek Albert I
- Foreword of le multiple by Jules Destrée, Bruxelles, 1996, Académie royale de langue et de littérature françaises, ISBN 2-8032-0016-3
- L'air des lettres, 2000, Bruxelles, Académie royale de langue et de littérature françaises, Foreword by Jacques De Decker, ISBN 2-8032-0035-X
- Norge de tout jour 2001, Tournai, La renaissance du livre
- Foreword of Poésie by Roger Cantraine, 2002, Leuze, Editions de l'Acanthe, ISBN 2-930219-62-9
