= Renée Brock =

Belgian writer (1912–1980)

Renée Brock (September 13, 1912 – March 12, 1980) was a Belgian writer.

She was born Renée Sarlet in Liège, the daughter of an engineer for National Railway Company of Belgium who later became the owner of a large construction company. She was educated at the Lycée Braquaval. In 1933, she married Henri Brock. During the German occupation of Belgium, she and her husband took part in the resistance.

In 1949, she published Poème du sang, and in 1960, her collection of poems L'amande amère was released. She wrote her first short story, Mort de la buse, in 1963. Her collection of short stories L'étranger intime won the Prix Victor-Rossel in 1971. Ceux du canal, another collection of stories, appeared in 1980.

She died suddenly from a heart attack at the age of 67 and much of her work was published posthumously. This included:

- Poésies complètes and Pourquoi, comment j'écris, poems (1982)
- L'étoile révolte, a collection of stories (1984)
- Le temps unique, poems (1986)
