= Constance Teichmann =

Belgian philanthropist (1824–1896)

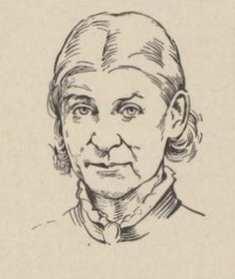
Constance Teichmann

Constance Teichmann (16 June 1824, in Antwerp – 14 December 1896, in Antwerp) was a Belgian philanthropist and patron of the arts, best remembered for her patronage of Hendrik Conscience, Prudens van Duyse, August Snieders, and Edgar Tinel. She treated victims of several cholera epidemics in Antwerp between 1948 and 1866. A member of the Red Cross since 1867, she treated soldiers on both sides of the Franco-Prussian War. A daughter of Jan Teichmann, she was made a knight of the Order of Leopold.
