= Ariane Le Fort =

Belgian writer (born 1960)

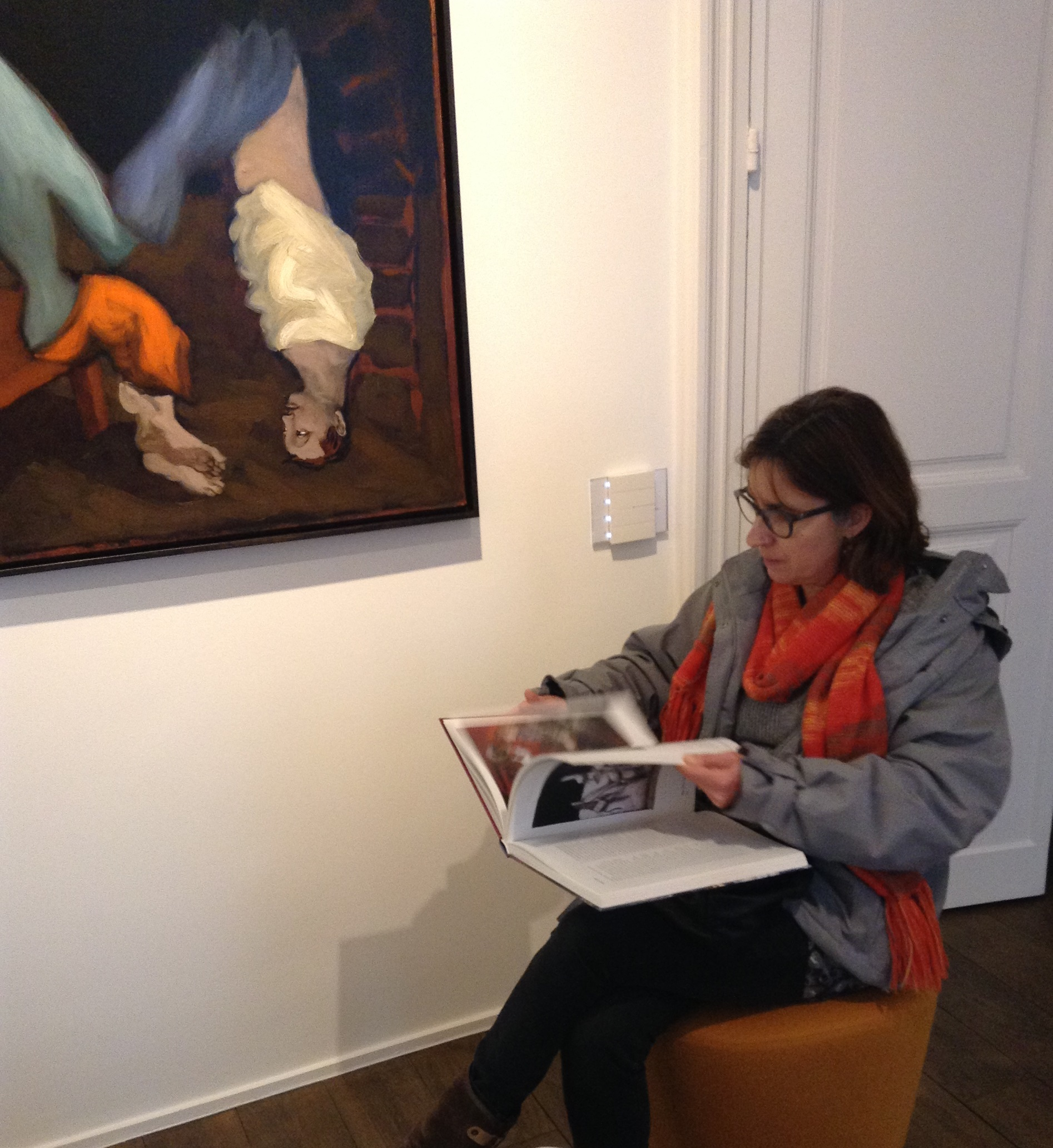
- Born: 18 June 1960 (age 66); Mons, Belgium
- Education: Goshen College; Université libre de Bruxelles
- Occupation: Writer
- Children: 2
- Writing career
- Notable awards: Prix Victor-Rossel (2003)

Ariane Le Fort (born 18 June 1960) is a Belgian writer.

== Biography ==
The daughter of a Swiss father and a Belgian mother, she was born in Mons and grew up there and in Brussels. She studied Latin and Greek at the Athénée Royal de Rixensart, then spent a year at Goshen College in Indiana and went on to study journalism and communications at the Université libre de Bruxelles. Le Fort has worked as a journalist, as a librarian, as a retail clerk in a book store and as a homework tutor. She is also mother of two children and teaches writing. Le Fort works hard to balance these activities with her writing.

== Selected works ==
- L'eau froide efface les rêves, novel (1989)
- Comment font les autres?, novel (1994)
- Rassurez-vous, tout le monde a peur, novel (1999)
- Beau-fils, novel (2003), received the Prix Victor-Rossel
- On ne va pas se quitter comme ça ?, novel (2010)
- Avec plaisir, François, novel (2013)
