= Charles Bertin =

Belgian poet

Charles Bertin (1919–2002) was a Belgian poet.
