= Sophie Deroisin =

Belgian writer (1909–1994)

Marie de Romrée de Vichenet
- Born: 3 June 1909
- Died: 17 December 1994 (aged 85)
- Other names: Sophie Deroisin
- Citizenship: Belgian
- Occupation: Writer

Marie de Romrée de Vichenet (she wrote under the name Sophie Deroisin; 3 June 1909 – 17 December 1994) was a Belgian writer.

== Early life ==
The daughter of Count Charles de Romrée, Belgian ambassador, and Marie-Madeleine Crombez, she was born in Bern. In 1938, she married André Nève de Mévergnies; he died later that same year in a car accident. From 1940, she moved with her father to various diplomatic postings. She served as press attaché at the Belgian consulate in South Africa. While there, she began to write La Taverne des sept mers. Carnets de guerre, Capetown 1941–1943, Alger 1944. In 1944, she returned to Belgium by way of Algiers and Paris.

== Publications ==
Her first novel was Les Publicains. In 1975, she received the Prix Victor-Rossel for her novel Les Dames. Her last novel Petites filles d'autrefois was awarded the Prix littéraire de la Communauté française in 1984. At this point, poor health prevented her from finishing any further work.

She contributed to La Revue générale and, as a Catholic, helped establish the Scriptores catholici, an association of Catholic writers in Belgium, in 1934.

== Death ==
She died in Brussels at the age of 85.
