= Irène Stecyk =

Belgian writer (born 1937)

Irène Stecyk (born 27 July 1937) is a Belgian novelist and poet.

== Biography ==
The daughter of a Ukrainian father and a Belgian mother, she was born in Liège and was educated there, going on to study library science. She worked as a librarian and was also secretary for the writer Alexis Curvers for a number of years.

In 1960, she published a collection of poetry Les monstres sympathiques. However, she is best known as a novelist. Stecyk has also published stories and articles in various journals in France and Belgium.

She was married to the poet Yves Lebon, who died in 2003.

== Awards and honours ==
- 1972 – Prix Victor-Rossel for Une petite femme aux yeux bleus

== Selected works ==
- Une petite femme aux yeux bleus (1973), received the Prix Victor-Rossel, was later adapted for television
- Mazeppa, prince de l'Ukraine (1981), received the Prix Jeanne Boujassy awarded by the French Société des gens de lettres and the prize awarded every five years for a historical novel by the Association des écrivains belges de langue française
- Perle morte (1992), received the Prix Sander Pierron from the Académie royale de langue et de littérature françaises de Belgique
- La Balzac (1992), received the Prix du Conseil de la Communauté Française
- La fille de Pierre (2001)
