= Jacques De Decker =

Belgian playwright (1945–2020)

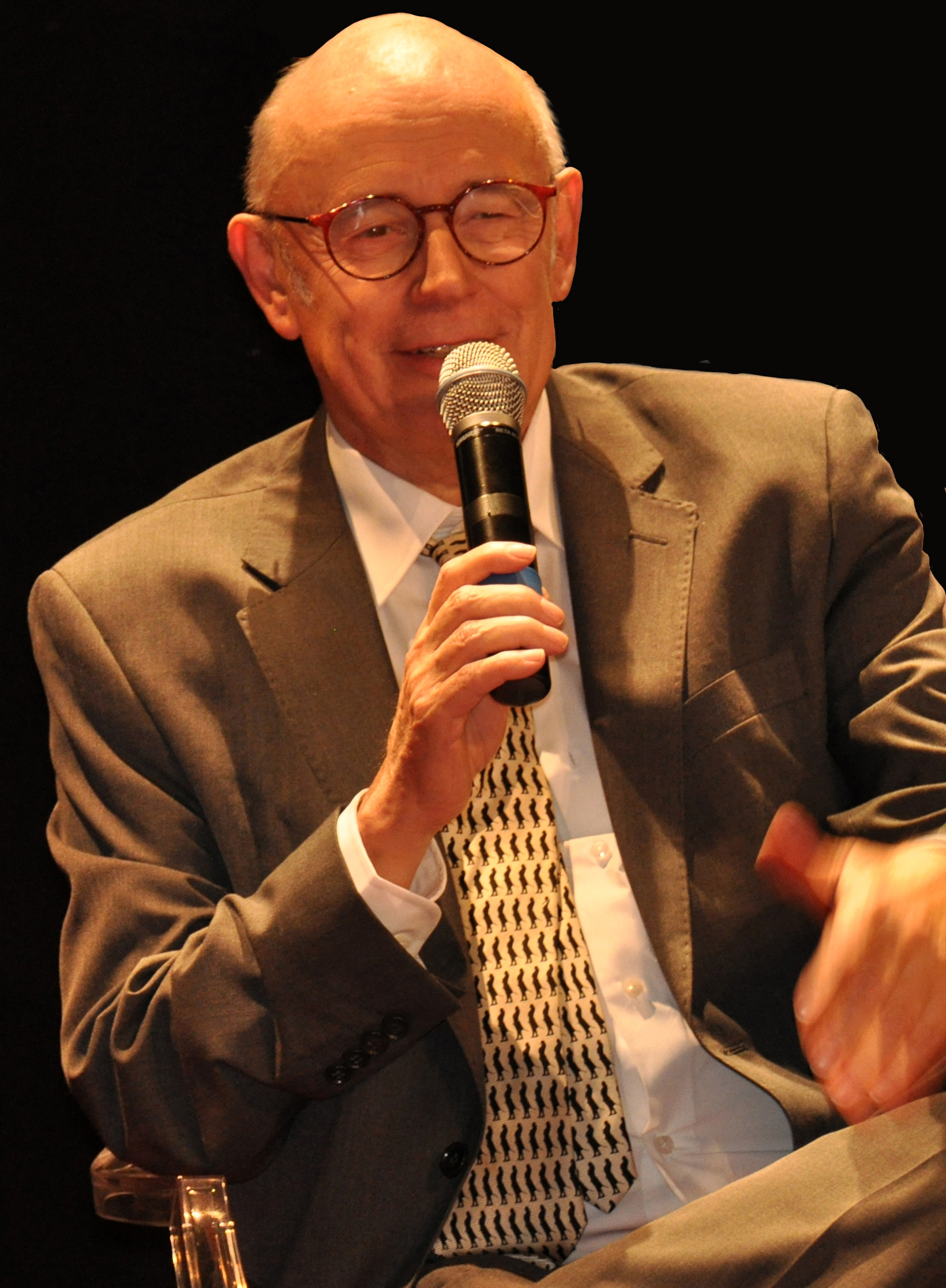
- De Decker in 2014
- Born: 19 August 1945; Schaerbeek, Belgium
- Died: 12 April 2020 (aged 74); Brussels, Belgium
- Occupations: Writer; Author

Jacques De Decker (19 August 1945 – 12 April 2020) was a Belgian writer and author.

== Biography ==
De Decker was born in Schaerbeek in 1945. His brother was Armand De Decker, a politician, and his father was Luc De Decker, a painter.

De Decker characterized his writing with its multiple diversities. He was the only author in Belgium to write in the country's three native languages: Dutch, French, and German. He also wrote in many different genres.

He worked as a teacher and a journalist before working as a professor at the Académie royale de langue et de littérature françaises de Belgique. He also taught at the Université libre de Bruxelles, the École d'interprètes internationaux, the University of Mons, INSAS, and the Royal Conservatory of Brussels. He started journalism in 1971, and worked for the daily newspaper Le Soir, where he directed cultural services from 1985 to 1990.

De Decker founded the Théâtre de l'Esprit Frappeur alongside Albert-André Lheureux in 1963. At the theatre, the pair displayed works by Hugo Claus, Henrik Ibsen, Anton Chekhov, and August Strindberg.

In 1985, De Decker published his first novel, La Grande Roue, which was selected for the Prix Goncourt and translated into several languages. During this time, he developed a vast array of material as an essayist, biographer, and critic. He was President of the Organisation Beaumarchais in Paris, and then elected to succeed Albert Ayguesparse as President of the Académie royale de langue et de littérature françaises de Belgique in Brussels in 1997. In 1998, he helped relaunch the magazine Marginales. In this endeavor, he joined Jean Jauniaux, who also wrote La Faculté des Lettres.

Jacques De Decker died on 12 April 2020 in Brussels, at the age of 74 from COVID-19.

== Literary works ==
=== Novels ===
- La Grande roue (1985)
- Parades amoureuses (1990)
- Lettres de mon auto (1990)
- Le Ventre de la baleine (1996)
- Tu n'as rien vu à Waterloo (2003)
- Histoires de tableaux (2005)
- Modèles réduits (2010)

=== Essays ===
- Over Claus' Toneel (1971)
- Bruxelles un guide intime (1987)
- Les Années critiques : Les Septentrionaux (1990)
- En lisant, en écoutant.. (1996)
- La Brosse à relire (1999)
- Un bagage poétique pour le 3e millénaire (2001)
- Les Philosophes amateurs (2004)
- Entretien avec Hubert Nyssen (2005)

=== Biographies ===
- Ibsen (2006)
- Wagner (2010)
