= Françoise Mallet-Joris =

Belgian author (1930–2016)

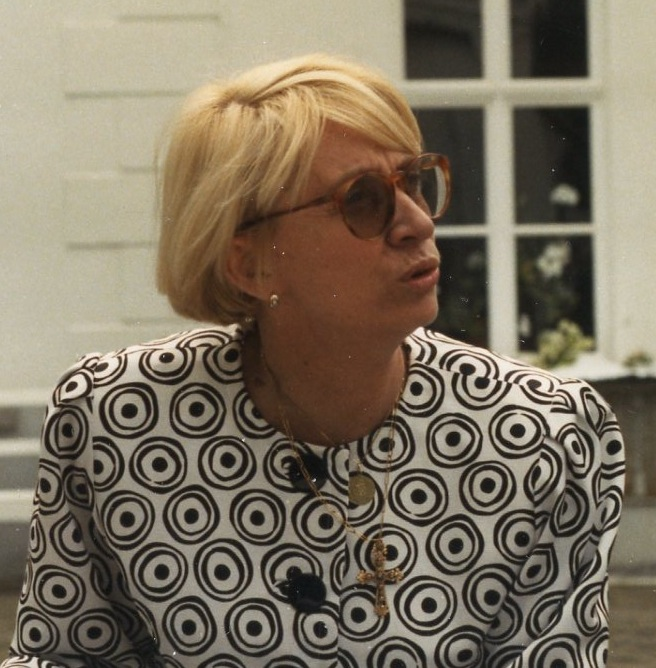
- Mallet-Joris in 1988
- Born: Françoise-Eugenie-Julienne Lilar; 6 July 1930; Antwerp, Belgium
- Died: 13 August 2016 (aged 86); Bry-sur-Marne, France
- Occupation: Author
- Organization(s): Prix Femina; Académie Goncourt
- Spouses: Robert Amadou; Alain Joxe; Jacques Delfau
- Children: 4

Françoise Mallet-Joris (6 July 1930 – 13 August 2016), the pen name of Françoise Lilar, was a Belgian author. She was a member of the Prix Femina committee from 1969 to 1971 and was appointed to the Académie Goncourt from November 1971 to 2011.

== Early life ==
Françoise-Eugenie-Julienne Lilar was born on 6 July 1930 in Antwerp. She was the first child of writer Suzanne Lilar (first woman admitted to the Antwerp Bar) and Albert Lilar, Belgian Minister of Justice and Minister of State. Françoise was also the older sister of Marie Fredericq-Lilar, an art historian of the 18th century. The household was French-speaking, but Françoise picked up Flemish from a maid.

As a teenager, Lilar was quite rebellious, and desperately sought her independence from her parents. To defy them, she began dating an older man, playwright Louis Decreux. When her parents found out, they sent her to Bryn Mawr College in Pennsylvania, but it didn't last long. To further annoy her parents, she married a Yale graduate student, Robert Amadou in 1948. The same year, Lilar gave birth to their son, Daniel Amadou. Robert Amadou was French, and through him, Lilar gained French citizenship. After obtaining that, Lilar and Amadou divorced.

During her time in Paris, Lilar attended the Sorbonne. Around this time, Lilar and her parents reconciled their relationship.

== Career ==
Lilar began her literary career with the publication of Le rempart des Béguines in 1951. She published under the name Françoise Mallet to avoid embarrassing her family, due to the novel's scandalous (lesbian) content. Later on in her career, however, she altered her penname to Françoise Mallet-Joris so as not to be confused with Robert Mallet. Le rempart des Béguines was translated and published in America as The Illusionist and later on it was reprinted under the titles Into the Labyrinth and The Loving and the Daring. It is set in a town that resembles Mallet-Joris' native Antwerp and addresses the themes of social class and lesbianism. She followed her first work with a sequel in 1955 named La chambre rouge, in English; The Red Room. In it, she focused less on lesbian themes but continued her treatment of social class and norms in Belgium.

Lilar became quite a prominent literary and public figure in France. As her career progressed, she mostly abandoned her Belgian roots, instead opting for a very Parisian career.

Her poem "Je veux pleurer comme Soraya" ("I Want to Cry Like Soraya") was inspired by the divorce of Soraya Esfandiary-Bakhtiary from Shah Mohammad Reza Pahlavi in 1958. The poem was adapted into a hit pop song, composed and sung by Marie-Paule Belle, released in 1995.

Her last novel, Ni vous sans moi, ni moi sans vous, was published in 2007.

=== Themes ===
Mallet-Joris' novels frequently deal with interpersonal relationships and social class in France and Belgium. Often, characters must deal with disappointment as they realize they have unrealistic expectations. She also depicts social climbers and deceitful characters.

In Allegra (1976) Mallet-Joris tackled the themes of racism and feminism in France.

She has also written works of non-fiction, like The Uncompromising Heart: A Life of Marie Mancini, Louis XIV's First Love in 1964, and she has written essays about her philosophy of life and writing in Lettre à moi-même (A Letter to Myself) in 1963 and La Maison de papier (The Paper House) in 1970.

=== Literary awards ===
Lilar won the "Librarians' Prize" (Prix des bibliothécaires) in 1958 for House of Lies (in French, the title was Les mensonges which means simply "Lies"), the Femina Prize in 1958 for Café Céleste (in French, it was called L'empire céleste which means "Heavenly Empire" or "Celestial Empire", a title that is highly ironic) and the Monaco Prize in 1964 for her biography of Marie Mancini.

== Personal life and death ==
In 1952, she was married to French historian Alain Joxe, but only for two years. Lilar referred to it as a summer romance.

Later, she entered a relationship with Jacques Delfau. They married in 1958. Together, they had three children: Vincent, Alberte, and Pauline.

Lilar had affairs with both men and women throughout her lifetime. Around 1970, Lilar met Marie-Paule Belle, a French variety singer who was openly lesbian. The two did not keep their relationship a secret. Lilar even composed lyrics for some of Belle’s songs, including writing the song which would bring Belle to celebrity status. Their affair ended in 1981. One year later, Lilar and Jacques Delfau divorced.

From 1969 to 1971, Lilar was a member of the Prix Femina jury. Because of that, after her term ended, she was unanimously elected to the Goncourt Academy in November 1971. She held that seat until 2011 when she resigned for health reasons.

Françoise Mallet-Joris died on 13 August 2016, in Bry-sur-Marne, France at the age of 86.

== Selected works ==
- 1951: Le Rempart des Béguines
  - Translated by Herma Briffault in 1952 as The Illusionist, also known as Into the Labyrinth and The Loving and the Daring
- 1955: La chambre rouge (The Red Room)
- 1958: Cordélia (a collection of short stories);
- 1966: Les Signes et les prodiges (Signs and Wonders)
- 1968: Trois âges de la nuit (The Witches)
- 1970: La Maison de papier (The Paper House)
- 1973: Le Jeu du souterrain (The Underground Game)
- 1976: Allegra
- 1978: Jeanne Guyon (a biography)
- 1980: Dickie-Roi (miniserie : Dickie-roi)
- 1985: Le Rire de Laura (Laura's Laugh)
- 1990: Adriana Sposa
- 1993: Divine
- 1993: Les Larmes
