= Albert Ayguesparse =

Belgian writer (1900–1996)

- Born: 1 April 1900; Brussels, Belgium
- Died: 29 September 1996 (aged 96)
- Occupation: Writer

Albert Ayguesparse (1900–1996) was a Belgian writer.

== Bibliography ==
=== Essays ===
- Machinismes et culture
- Magie du capitalisme

=== Poetry ===
- Neuf offrandes claires (1923)
- Le Vin noir de Cahors (1957 – Prix Engelman)
- Langage

=== Novels ===
- La main morte
- Notre ombre nous précède (Prix Rossel 1952)
- Une génération pour rien (1954 – Prix triennal du roman).

== Sources ==
- Albert Ayguesparse (French)
- Albert Ayguesparse (French)
