= Suzanne Lilar =

Belgian essayist, novelist (1901–1992)

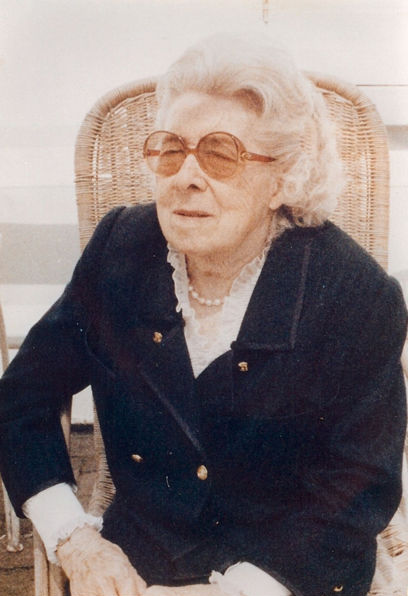
- Lilar in the 1980s
- Born: Suzanne Verbist; 21 May 1901; Ghent, Belgium
- Died: 11 December 1992 (aged 91); Brussels, Belgium
- Occupations: Essayist, novelist, playwright

Baroness Suzanne Lilar (née Suzanne Verbist; 21 May 1901 – 11 December 1992) was a Flemish Belgian essayist, novelist, and playwright writing in French. She was the wife of the Belgian Minister of Justice Albert Lilar and mother of the writer Françoise Mallet-Joris and the art historian Marie Fredericq-Lilar.

She was a member of the Royal Academy of French Language and Literature from 1952 to 1992.

== Life ==
Lilar's mother was a middle school teacher, her father a railway station master. After having lived her youth in Ghent, Belgium, and following a brief first marriage, she moved to Antwerp, where she became the first woman lawyer, and where in 1929 she married the lawyer Albert Lilar, who would later become a Minister of Justice and Minister of State (Liberal Party). She was the mother of the writer Françoise Mallet-Joris (born 1930) and the 18th-century art historian Marie Fredericq-Lilar (born 1934). After the death of her husband in 1976, she left Antwerp and relocated to Brussels in 1977.

== Education ==
Suzanne Lilar by Charles Leirens, signed, 1950s

In 1919, Lilar attended the State University of Ghent, where she studied philosophy and was the first woman to receive a law degree in 1925. During her studies she attended a seminar on Hadewych. Her interest in the 13th-century poet and mystic would play a role in her later essays, plays and novels. Lilar's historico-cultural insight, her analysis of consciousness and emotion, her search for beauty and love are current .

== Literary career ==
She was a modern writer and feminist who remained highly versed in many areas of traditional western thought (Encyclopædia Britannica). In 1956, Lilar succeeds Gustave Van Zype as member of the Royal Academy of French Language and Literature. Her life's work has been translated in numerous languages.

== Early work ==
Lilar began her literary career as a journalist, reporting on Republican Spain for the newspaper L'Indépendance belge in 1931. She later became a playwright with Le Burlador (1946), an original reinterpretation of the myth of Don Juan from the female perspective that revealed a profound capacity for psychological analysis. She wrote two more plays, Tous les chemins mènent au ciel (1947), a theological drama set in a 14th-century convent, and Le Roi lépreux (1951), a neo-Pirandellian play about the Crusades.

== Critical essays ==
Her earliest essays are on the subject of the theatre. Soixante ans de théâtre belge (1952), originally published in New York City in 1950 as The Belgian Theater since 1890, emphasizes the importance of a Flemish tradition. She followed this with Journal de l'analogiste (1954), in which the origin of the experience of beauty and poetry was guided by a path of analogies. A short essay Théâtre et mythomanie was published in 1958. Transcendence and metamorphosis are central to her seminal work Le Couple (1963), translated in 1965 by Jonathan Griffin as Aspects of Love in Western Society. In writings on Rubens, the Androgyne or homosexuality in Ancient Greece, Lilar meditates on the role of the woman in conjugal love throughout the ages. Translated into Dutch in 1976, it includes an afterword by Marnix Gijsen. In the same vein she later wrote critical essays on Jean-Paul Sartre (À propos de Sartre et de l'amour, 1967) and Simone de Beauvoir (Le Malentendu du Deuxième Sexe, 1969).

== Autobiographical works, novels ==
Lilar wrote two autobiographical books, Une Enfance gantoise (1976) and À la recherche d'une enfance (1979), and two novels, both of which date from 1960, Le Divertissement portugais and La Confession anonyme, a neoplatonic idealization of love filtered through personal experience. The Belgian director André Delvaux recreated this novel on film as Benvenuta in 1983, transposed as an intense examination of a tortured but exalted relationship between a young Belgian woman and her Italian lover. Les Moments merveilleux and Journal en partie double, I & II were published as part of Cahiers Suzanne Lilar (1986).

== Select bibliography ==
- Le Burlador (1945), Brussels: Éditions des Artistes. Portrait of Author by artist Albert Crommelynck.
- Tous les chemins mènent au ciel (1947), Brussels: Éditions des Artistes; reissued 1989, Brussels: Les Éperonniers.
- Le Roi lépreux (1951), Brussels: Les Éditions Lumière.
- The Belgian Theatre since 1890 (1950), New York: Belgian Government Information Center, 67 pp.
- Soixante ans de théâtre belge (1952).
- Journal de l'analogiste (1954), Paris: Éditions Julliard; reissued 1979, Paris: Grasset. Foreword by Julien Gracq, Introduction by Jean Tordeur.
- Le Jeu (1957), Woluwe-St.Lambert, Bruxelles: Editions Synthèses, nr. 128: 218–239.
- Théâtre et mythomanie (1958), Porto.
- La confession anonyme (1960), Paris: Éditions Julliard; reissued 1980, Brussels: Éditions Jacques Antoine, with foreword by the author; 1983, Paris: Gallimard, ISBN 2-07-025106-3. The Belgian film director André Delvaux adapted this novel in his film Benvenuta in 1983.
- Le Divertissement portugais (1960), Paris: Éditions Julliard; reissued 1990, Brussels Labor, Espace Nord, ISBN 2-8040-0569-0.
- Le Couple in La Nef, n.s. no. 5, La Française Aujourd'hui, La femme et l'Amour, pp. 33–45.
- Le Couple (1963), Paris: Grasset; reissued 1970, Bernard Grasset Coll. Diamant, 1972, Livre de Poche; 1982, Brussels: Les Éperonniers, ISBN 2-87132-193-0; Translated as Aspects of Love in Western Society in 1965, by and with a foreword by Jonathan Griffin, New York, McGraw-Hill, LC 65-19851.
- A propos de Sartre et de l'amour (1967), Paris: Éditions Bernard Grasset; reissued 1984, Gallimard, ISBN 2-07-035499-7.
- Le Malentendu du Deuxième Sexe (1969), with collaboration of Prof. Gilbert-Dreyfus. Paris: University Presses of France (Presses Universitaires de France).
- Une enfance gantoise (1976). Paris: Grassset, ISBN 2-246-00374-1; reissued 1986, Bibliothèque Marabout.
- A la recherche d'une enfance (1979). Foreword by Jean Tordeur. Brussels: Éditions Jacques Antoine, with original photos by the author's father.
- Faire un film avec André Delvaux (1982), pp. 209–214. In André Delvaux ou les visages de l'imaginaire, Ed. A. Nysenhole, Revue de l'Université de Bruxelles.
- Journal en partie double (1986) in Cahiers Suzanne Lilar, Paris: Gallimard, ISBN 2-07-070632-X.
- Les Moments merveilleux (1986) in Cahiers Suzanne Lilar, Paris: Gallimard, ISBN 2-07-070632-X.

== Literary awards ==
- Le Burlador, 1946. Prix Picard; 1947. Prix Vaxelaire;
- Journal de l'Analogiste. 1954. Prix Sainte-Beuve;
- Le Couple. 1963. Prix Ève Delacroix;
- 1972. Prix quinquennal de la critique de de l'essai, l'Académie française;
- 1973. Prix Belgo-Canadien for her oeuvre;
- 1977. Une enfance gantoise. Prix Saint-Simon;
- 1980. Prix Europalia for her oeuvre;
- 1982. A Colloquium on the oeuvre of Suzanne Lilar was organized by Henri Ronse, Director of the "Nouveau Théåtre" in Brussels. Participants included Elisabeth Badinter, Annie Cohen-Solal, Françoise Mallet-Joris, Hector Bianciotti, Jean Tordeur, André Delvaux, and Jacques de Decker, and their essays were published in 1986 in the "Cahiers Suzanne Lilar".

== Select critical works ==
- Autour de Suzanne Lilar. Texts of Georges Sion, Françoise Mallet-Joris, Julien Gracq, R.P. Carré, Roland Mortier, Armand Lanoux, Jacques de Decker, Jean Tordeur, Suzanne Lilar. Bulletin de l'Académie Royale de Langue et de Littérature françaises. Brussels, 1978, t. LVI, nr. 2, pp. 165–204.
- Alphabet des Lettres belges de langue française. Brussels, Association pour la promotion des Lettres belges de langue française, 1982.
- René Micha, 1982. <<Benvenuta>> d'André Delvaux: Une adaptation exemplaire de la <<Confession anonyme>> de Suzanne Lilar, pp. 215–219. In André Delvaux ou les visages de l'imaginaire, Ed. A. Nysenhole, Revue de l'Université de Bruxelles.
- Cahiers Suzanne Lilar. Paris, Gallimard, 1986 (with a bibliography by Martine Gilmont).
- Marc Quaghebeur, 1990, Lettres belges: entre absence et magie. Brussels, Labor, Archives du Futur.
- Paul Renard, 1991. Suzanne Lilar: Bio-Bibliographie, vol. 17, pp. 1–6 in Nord – Revue de Critique et de Création Littéraires du Nord/ Pas-de-Calais. Suzanne Lilar- Françoise Mallet-Joris, ISSN 0755-7884.
- Béatrice Gaben-Shults, 1991. Le Théåtre de Suzanne Lilar: tentation et refus de mysticisme, vol. 17, pp. 7–13, in Nord – Revue de Critique et de Création Littéraires du Nord/ Pas-de-Calais. Suzanne Lilar – Françoise Mallet-Joris, ISSN 0755-7884.
- Colette Nys-Mazure, 1991. La part du feu , vol. 17, pp. 15–22, in Nord – Revue de Critique et de Création Littéraires du Nord/ Pas-de-Calais. Suzanne Lilar – Françoise Mallet-Joris, ISSN 0755-7884.
- Colette Nys-Mazure, 1991. Dossiers Suzanne Lilar, dans Dossiers Littérature Française de Belgique (Service du Livre Luxembourgeois) fasc. 3(32): 1–27. ISSN 0772-0742
- Michèle Hecquet, 1991. L'Éducation paternelle: Une enfance gantoise, vol. 17, pp. 23–28, in Nord – Revue de Critique et de Création Littéraires du Nord/ Pas-de-Calais. Suzanne Lilar – Françoise Mallet-Joris, ISSN 0755-7884.
- Katharina M. Wilson, 1991, Suzanne Lilar in: An Encyclopedia of Continental Women Writers, Volume two: L-Z, p. 730 (entry by Donald Friedman), Taylor & Francis, ISBN 0-8240-8547-7, ISBN 978-0-8240-8547-6
- Colette Nys-Mazure, 1992, Suzanne Lilar. Brussels: Editions Labor, 150 pp., ISBN 2-8040-0698-0.
- Frans Amelinckx, 1995, L'apport de John Donne à l'œuvre de S. Lilar, pp. 259–270 in La Belgique telle qu'elle s'écrit.
- Françoise Mallet-Joris, Portrait of author; Colette Nys-Masure, foreword of Suzanne Lilar – Théåtre, 1999, Collection Poésie Théåtre Roman, Académie Royale de Langue de de Littérature Françaises, ISBN 2-8032-0033-3
- Suzanne Fredericq, 2001, 'Elegance: A Brief, Perfectly Balanced Instant of Complete Possession of Forms", pp. 14–19 In Elegance, Beauty and Truth", Ed. Lewis Pyenson, New Series Vol. 2, Center for Louisiana Studies, Univ. of Louisiana at Lafayette, ISBN 1-889911-09-7
- Susan Bainbrigge, 2004, Writing about the In-Between in Suzanne Lilar's Une Enfance gantoise, Forum for Modern Language Studies 40(3):301–313.
- Hélène Rouch, 2001–2002, Trois conceptions du sexe: Simone de Beauvoir entre Adrienne Sahuqué et Suzanne Lilar, Simone de Beauvoir Studies, n° 18, pp. 49–60.

== Interview ==
- "Une enfance gantoise – Une interview de Madame Suzanne Lilar". In Le Rail, 1977(2): 23–27
