= Grand prix catholique de littérature =

The grand prix catholique de littérature is a French literary prize awarded by the Association des écrivains catholiques de langue française (established in 1886).

== History ==
Established in 1945 (prix du Renouveau français) under the impulse of Catholic writers including Jacques Maritain and Jacques Madaule, it is also called, by abuse of language, "grand prix des écrivains catholiques". Usually awarded in spring, its amount is variable. After three years of interruption, it has been awarded again since 2000.

The grand prix catholique de littérature, awarded by a jury composed of writers, should not be confused with the prix de littérature religieuse, which is awarded by religious booksellers.

== List of laureates ==
- 1951: Claude Longhy for La Mesure du monde
- 1952: Georges Bordonove for La Caste
- 1953: Gilbert Tournier for Rhône, dieu conquis
- 1954: Camille Bourniquel for Retour à Cirgue
- 1955: Paul-André Lesort for Le vent souffle où il veut
- 1956: Yvonne Chauffin for Les Rambourt and Louise Bugeaud for La Barre aux faucons
- 1957: Jean-Claude Renard for Père, voici que l'homme
- 1958: Franz Weyergans for Les Gens heureux
- 1959: Maurice Zermatten for all is work
- 1960: Jean Pélégri for Les Oliviers de la justice
- 1961: Lucien Guissard for Écrits en notre temps
- 1962: Victor-Henry Debidour for all his work and Claude Tresmontant for all his work
- 1963: Jean Montaurier for Comme à travers le feu
- 1964: Jean Sulivan for Mais il y a la mer
- 1965: Miklós Bátori for Le Vignoble des saints
- 1966: Yves-Marie Rudel for all his work
- 1967: Renée Massip for Le Rire de Sara
- 1968: Henri de Lubac for Images de l'abbé Monchanin and all his work
- 1969: André Frossard for Dieu existe, je l'ai rencontré
- 1970: P. Jacques Loew for all his work and Jean Rivière for La Vie simple
- 1971: Patrice de La Tour du Pin for Une Lutte pour la vie
- 1972: Michel Huriet for La Fiancée du roi
- 1973: Lucien Farago for Mademoiselle Marguerite
- 1974: P. François Varillon for L’Humilité de Dieu
- 1975: Valentin-Yves Mudimbe for Entre les eaux
- 1976: Jacques de Bourbon Busset for Au vent de la mémoire (Journal VI)
- 1977: Jean Delumeau for Le christianisme va-t-il mourir ?
- 1978: Maurice Schumann for Angoisse et Certitude
- 1980: P. Jean-Robert Armogathe for Paul, ou l’impossible unité
- 1981: Jean Mialet for Le Déporté (la haine et le pardon)
- 1982: Jean Séverin for Une vie peuplée d'enfants
- 1983: Père Bernard Bro for all his work
- 1984: Pierre Pierrard for L'Église et les ouvriers
- 1985: Christian Chabanis for Dieu existe-t-il ? oui
- 1986: Jeanne Bourin for Le Grand Feu
- 1987: Jean Daujat for all his work
- 1988: Jean Charbonnel for Edmond Michelet
- 1989: Jacques Loew
- 1990: Monique Piettre
- 1991: Jacques Sommet for Passion des hommes et pardon de Dieu
- 1992: Pierre de Calan for On retrouve Dieu partout
- 1993: Christian Bobin for Le Très-Bas
- 1994: Olivier Germain-Thomas for Bouddha, terre ouverte
- 1995: Xavier Emmanuelli for Dernier avis avant la fin du monde
- 1996: Jean-Luc Barré for Algérie, l'espoir fraternel
- 2000: P. Bertrand de Margerie for Le Mystère des indulgences
- 2001: Anne Bernet for Histoire générale de la chouannerie
- 2002: Mgr Mansour Labaky for Kfar Sama ou les enfants de l'aurore
- 2003: André Courtaigne for La Mère du printemps and Bernard Quilliet for La Tradition humaniste
- 2004: Jean Sévillia for Historiquement correct : Pour en finir avec le passé unique and Yves Viollier for L’Orgueil de la tribu
- 2005: Jean Dutourd for Journal intime d'un mort
- 2006: Fabrice Hadjadj for Réussir sa mort. Anti-méthode pour vivre
- 2007: Charles Le Quintrec for all his work. Mention to father Servais Pinckaers for Plaidoyer pour la vertu and Dorian Malovic for Le Pape jaune
- 2008: Philippe Sellier for La Bible expliquée à ceux qui ne l’ont pas encore lue
- 2009: Claude-Henri Rocquet for Goya and Dominique Ponnau for all his work
- 2010: Claire Daudin for Le Sourire
- 2011: Alain Besançon for Cinq personnages en quête d'amour. Mention to Christophe Carichon for Agnès de Nanteuil 1922-1944 une vie offerte and Nadine Cretin for Histoire du Père Noël
- 2012: Eugène Green for La Communauté universelle. Mention to Anne-Dauphine Julliand for Deux petits pas sur le sable mouillé and Alain Galliari for Franz Liszt et l'espérance du bon larron
- 2013: Didier Rance for John Bradburne, le vagabond de Dieu. Mention to Jean-Paul Mongin for Denys l'Aréopagite et le nom de Dieu.
- 2014: François Taillandier for L'Écriture du monde. Mention to Véronique Dufief for La Souffrance désarmée and father Michaël Brétéché for L'Enfance retrouvée
- 2015: Isabelle Laurent for Les Deux Couronnes. Mention to Denis Moreau for Pour la vie and Christophe Ferré for Vierge d'amour
- 2016: Marie-Joëlle Guillaume for Vincent de Paul. Mention to Jehanne Nguyen for Violette and Patrice de Plunkett for La révolution du pape François.
- 2017: François Cassingena-Trévedy

=== Laureates of the Prix du renouveau français ===
- 1946: Claude Franchet for Les Trois Demoiselles de Colas
- 1947: Élisabeth Barbier for Les Gens de Mogador
- 1948: Raïssa Maritain for Les Grandes Amitiés
- 1949: Henri Queffélec for Au bout du monde
- 1950: Pierre-Henri Simon for Les Raisins verts
