= Pensées =

Collection of fragments written by Blaise Pascal

Second edition of Blaise Pascal's Pensées, 1670

The Pensées (Thoughts) is a collection of fragments written by the French 17th-century philosopher and mathematician Blaise Pascal. Pascal's religious conversion led him into a life of asceticism, and the Pensées was in many ways his life's work. It represented Pascal's defense of the Christian religion, and the concept of "Pascal's wager" stems from a portion of this work.

Prior to his death, Pascal was working on a Christian apologetics book which was never completed. When Pascal died in 1662, he left behind several draft notes. They were edited by others, and the notes were first published in the form of Pensées in 1670. The order with which the notes should be read was unclear, and various subsequent editions have attempted to order them by themes or by writing dates. An edition of the Pensées containing notes by Voltaire was placed on the Index Librorum Prohibitorum by a decree of 18 September 1789.

== Contents ==
The style of the book has been described as aphoristic, or by Peter Kreeft as more like a collection of "sayings" than a book.

Pascal is sceptical of cosmological arguments for God's existence and says that when religious people present such arguments they give atheists "ground for believing that the proofs of our religion are very weak". He argues that the Bible actually cautions against these approaches. Scripture says that "God is a hidden God, and that, since the corruption of nature, He has left men in a darkness from which they can escape only through Jesus Christ, without whom all communion with God is cut off".

He writes that it is an "astounding fact" that no "canonical" writer ever offers such proofs, and that this omission makes it "worthy of attention." Pascal claims that atheists make of Christianity a straw man. He writes, "If this religion boasted of having a clear view of God, and of possessing it open and unveiled, it would be attacking it to say that we see nothing in the world which shows it with this clearness. [...] On the contrary, it says that men are in darkness and estranged from God, that He has hidden Himself from their knowledge". Hence the atheists' arguments are not criticisms of Christianity. For Pascal, Christianity says God is found only by those "who seek Him with all their heart"; but atheists do not do this and their arguments are not related to this process.

Pascal writes that "Scepticism is true; for, after all, men before Jesus Christ did not know where they were, nor whether they were great or small. And those who have said the one or the other, knew nothing about it, and guessed without reason and by chance. They also erred always in excluding the one or the other." He considers truth to be arrived at "not only by the reason, but also by the heart, and it is in this last way that we know first principles; and reason, which has no part in it, tries in vain to impugn them". Sceptics then who only engage by means of reason "labour to no purpose".

== Publication history ==
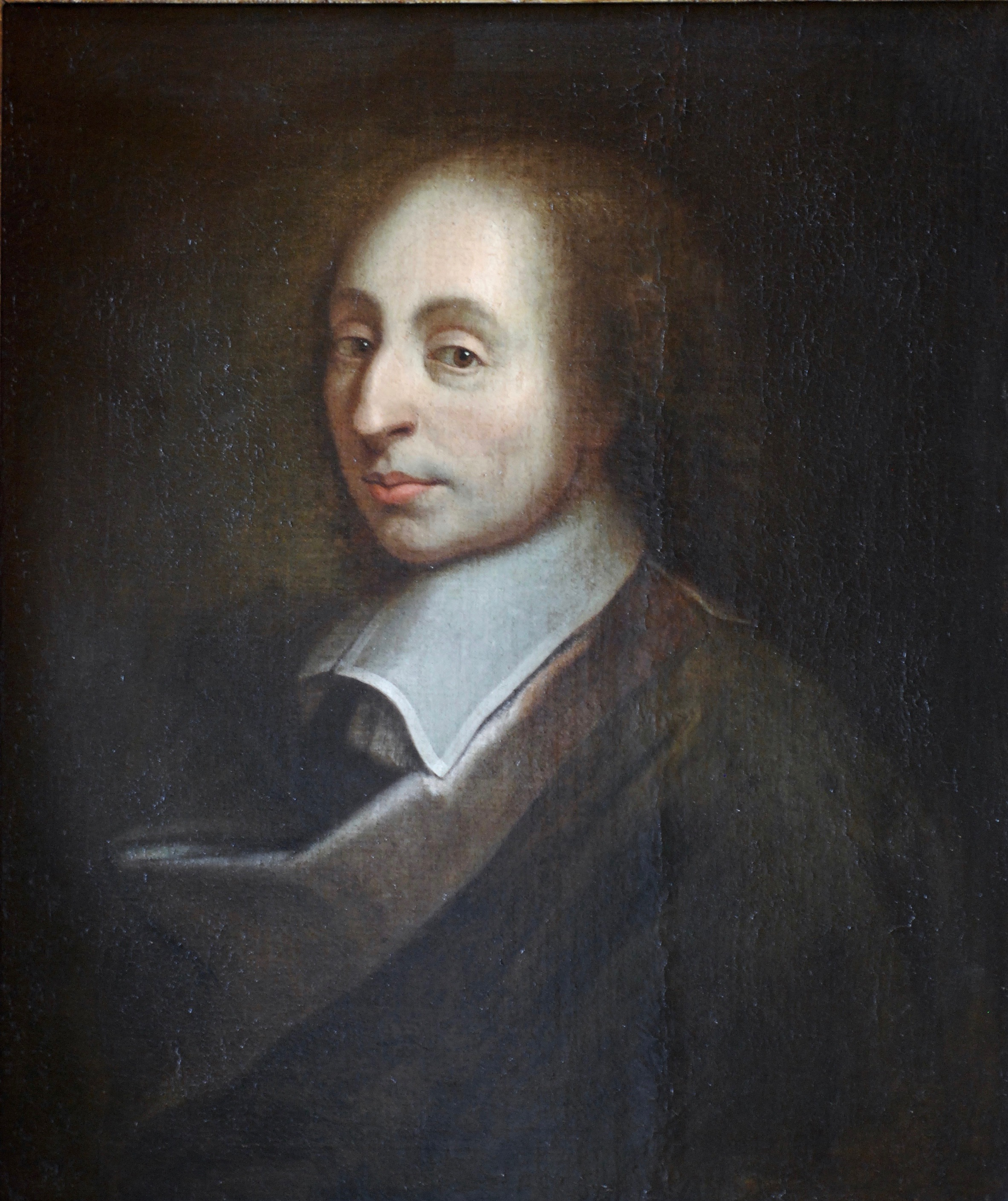
Pascal

The Pensées is the name given posthumously to fragments that Pascal had been preparing for an apology for Christianity, which was never completed. That envisioned work is often referred to as the Apology for the Christian Religion, although Pascal never used that title.

Although the Pensées appears to consist of ideas and jottings, some of which are incomplete, it is believed that Pascal had, prior to his death in 1662, already planned out the order of the book and had begun the task of cutting and pasting his draft notes into a coherent form. His task incomplete, subsequent editors have heavily disagreed on the order, if any, in which his writings should be read. Those responsible for his effects, failing to recognize the basic structure of the work, handed them over to be edited, and they were published in 1670. The first English translation was made in 1688 by John Walker. Another English translation by W. F. Trotter was published in 1931 with an introduction by T. S. Eliot.

Several attempts have been made to arrange the notes systematically; notable editions include those of Léon Brunschvicg, Jacques Chevalier, Louis Lafuma and (more recently) Philippe Sellier. Although Brunschvicg tried to classify the posthumous fragments according to themes, recent research has prompted Sellier to choose entirely different classifications, as Pascal often examined the same event or example through many different lenses. Also noteworthy is the monumental edition of Pascal's Œuvres complètes (1964–1992), which is known as the Tercentenary Edition and was realized by Jean Mesnard; although still incomplete, this edition reviews the dating, history and critical bibliography of each of Pascal's texts.

In 1776, Condorcet published a new, selectively edited edition of the Pensées. A two-volume edition published at Geneva in 1778 reproduced Condorcet's text and added critical notes by Voltaire. The Index Librorum Prohibitorum listed this annotated edition—Pensées, avec les notes de M. Voltaire—under a decree dated 18 September 1789.

== Reception and legacy ==
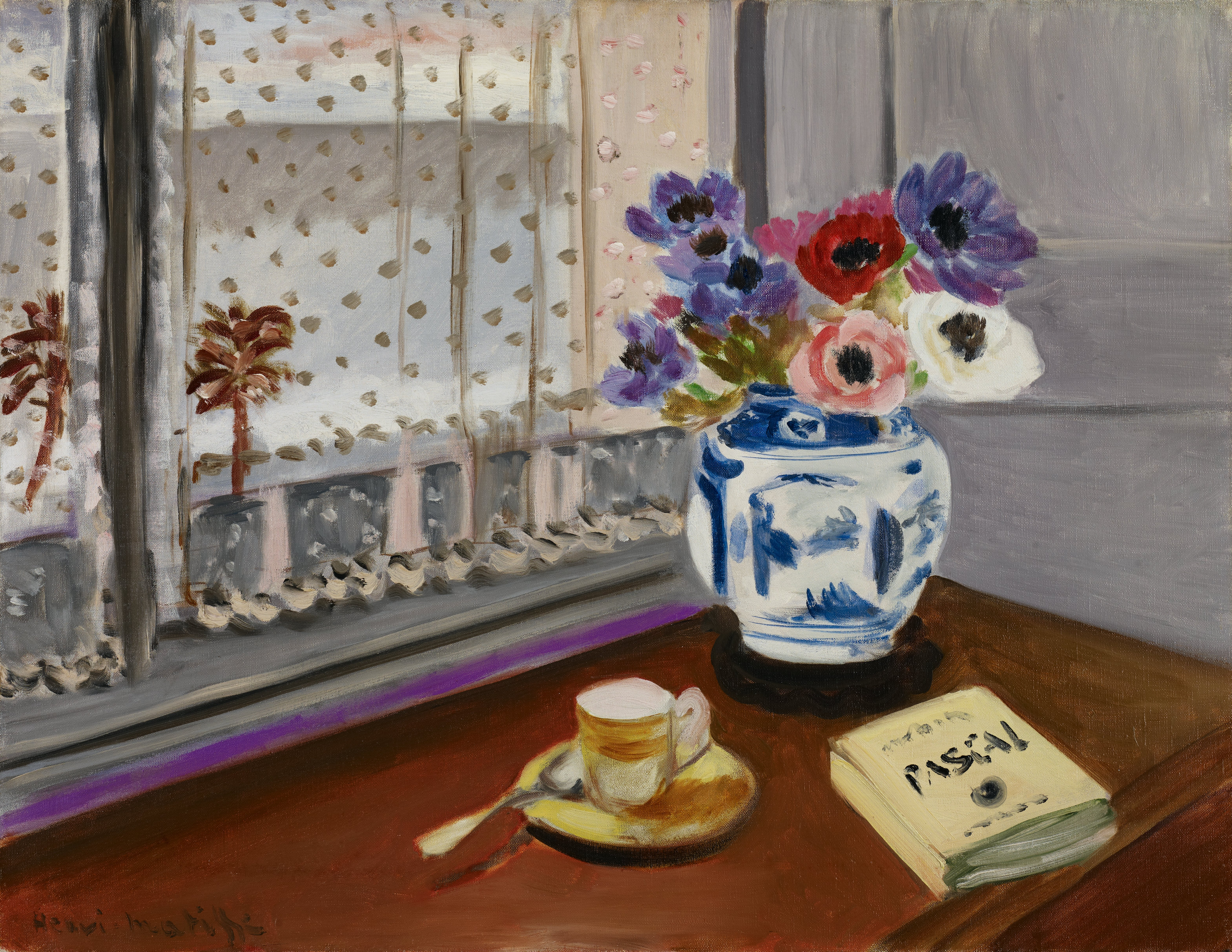
Henri Matisse - Still Life with Pascal’s Pensées (1924)

German philosopher Martin Heidegger was influenced by Pascal's Pensées. During the 1920s Heidegger kept a photograph of Pascal's death mask in his study room. Pascal is mentioned in the introduction (and quoted in two footnotes) of his 1927 work Being and Time. In recent times scholars have noted parallels between Heidegger and Pensées, while postulating various instances of influence.

Phenomenological value theorists, particularly Max Scheler, have been influenced by the book.

Jean Paul Sartre read Pensées as a youth and his own publications and notebooks reflect the influence of the Pensées.

Friedrich Nietzsche's relationship to Pascal and the Pensées was ambivalent. He thought Pascal "the most instructive victim of Christianity" and expressed his "love" of him "since he has enlightened me infinitely: the only logical Christian". Although as an anti-Christian Nietzsche was highly critical of the Christian parts of the Pensées, he did find his psychological and social observations astute. Others have also taken an interest in Pascal's sociological and psychological observations. For instance Pierre Bourdieu's Pascalian Meditations and Louis Althusser in his essay Ideology and Ideological State Apparatuses.

Pope Paul VI, in encyclical Populorum progressio, issued in 1967, quotes Pascal's Pensées:

True humanism points the way toward God and acknowledges the task to which we are called, the task which offers us the real meaning of human life. Man is not the ultimate measure of man. Man becomes truly man only by passing beyond himself. In the words of Pascal: "Man infinitely surpasses man.

In June 2023, Pope Francis published an apostolic letter, Sublimitas et Miseria Hominis, on the fourth centenary of Pascal's birth which paid tribute to Pascal. He described the Pensées as "monumental" and praised its "philosophical depth and literary charm".

== See also ==
- Lettres provinciales

== Editions ==
- and Nicole, Pierre (1877). Pensées de Pascal (in French) – via Internet Archive.
- Pascal's Pensées; or, Thoughts on Religion. Translated by Burford Rawlings, Gertrude. 1900.
- Pensées / The Provincial Letters. Translated by Trotter, William Finlayson; M'Crie, Thomas. New York: Modern Library. 1941.
- and Brunschvicg, Léon (1904). Pensées. Paris: Librairie Hachette.
