= Nicolas Caussin =

French Jesuit (1583–1651)

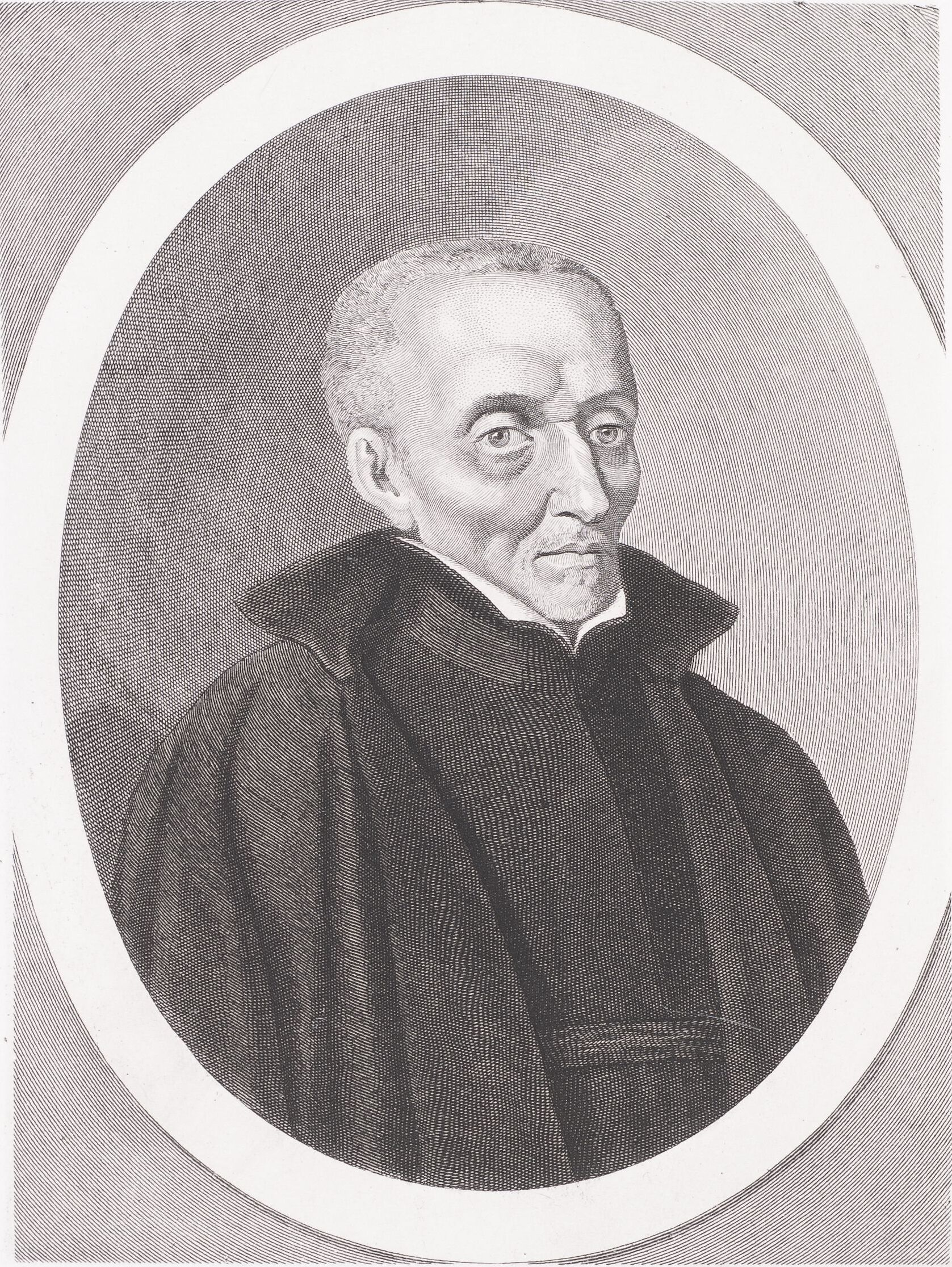
- Father Nicolas Caussin
- Born: 1583; Troyes, France
- Died: July 2, 1651 (aged 67–68)
- Occupations: Jesuit priest and orator
- Known for: confessor to King Louis XIII of France
- Notable work: treatise, The Holy Court

Nicolas Caussin (1583 – July 2, 1651) was a French Jesuit, orator; and for a time, confessor to King Louis XIII of France. His treatise, The Holy Court, a guide for courtiers in living a Christian life, was published in 1624. Caussin was removed from his position as royal confessor after only nine months and exiled to Quimper when his spiritual counsel seemed to clash with Cardinal Richelieu's political policies.

== Life ==
Caussin was born in Troyes, the son of a physician. He entered the Society of Jesus in 1609. He taught at Rouen, La Flèche, and Paris, and became a noted orator. Famous for his 1624 La Cour saincte, in March 1637, Cardinal Richelieu chose Caussin for the position of Louis XIII's confessor; and at the same time admonished him to stay out of politics.

France and Spain had been at war since 1635. In the summer of 1637, Richelieu ordered an inquiry into secret communications between Anne of Austria and her brother, Philip IV of Spain. The queen had been a long-time opponent of the Cardinal. While her household was replaced by people loyal to the king and cardinal, Caussin's counsel was crucial in obtaining royal clemency for the queen. He encouraged the king to honor his conjugal obligations and after twenty years of marriage and four miscarriages, an heir, Louis XIV, was born the following September.

As a conscientious and rigorous spiritual director, Caussin drew the king's attention to his strained relations with his mother; the damage caused by France's policies not only in France but in Christendom, the destruction caused by the country's wars, and the high taxes levied to fight them. In particular, he maintained that the war with Catholic Spain was against God's will.

In December of that same year, Richelieu exiled Caussin to Quimper.

Caussin returned to Paris in 1643, following the death of Richelieu. When the Jesuits attacked the Jansenists as heretics similar to Calvinists, Antoine Arnauld wrote in defense the Théologie morale des Jésuites (Moral Theology of Jesuits), which denounced the "relaxed moral" of Jesuit casuistry. Caussin was charged by his order with the task of writing a defense against Arnauld's book. Réponse au libelle intitulé La Théologie morale des Jésuites was issued in 1644. According to Sellier, due to his rigorism and to the formulations in those books justifying the "relaxed moral" concerning confession, the public generally considered that he had written against his thought by fidelity to his jesuit order.

Caussin became confessor to Louis, Grand Condé. He died July 2, 1651.

Jansenist Antoine Arnauld said that the reason for Caussin's fall from grace was that he spoke against the efficacy of Imperfect contrition. This cause was re-asserted by Philippe Sellier and Gérard Ferreyrolles in their 2004 edition of Pascal's works.

== Works ==
- De Eloquentia sacra et humana
- Tragœdiae sacrae, 1620.
- "De symbolica Aegyptiorum sapientia", 1623.
- La Cour sainte
- Apologie pour les religieux de la Compagnie de Jésus, à la reine régente, 1644.
- Réponse au libelle intitulé La Théologie morale des Jésuites, 1644.
- "Caussin, Nicolas, 1583-1651". onlinebooks.library.upenn.edu.

== Bibliography ==
- G.-D. Hocking: A Study of the 'Tragœdiae sacrae' of Father Caussin, Baltimore, 1943.
