= Edouard Wattez =

French diplomat

Edouard Adrien André Wattez (French pronunciation: [eduɑʁ adriɛ̃ ɑ̃dre watɛːz], born 22 November 1941) is a French United Nations diplomat who worked for the United Nations for more than 32 years in the Asia-Pacific, Africa and Middle East Regions in the United Nations Development Programme (UNDP) agency, leading assignments mainly in crisis, peace building, post-war and transition countries such as Senegal, the Fiji Islands, Rwanda, Jerusalem, Cambodia, Vietnam and Sri Lanka.

== Biography ==
Edouard Wattez was born in Paris to doctor and radiologist E. Wattez and his wife Colette Marandet, on 22 Novembre 1941. The family, whose roots lay in France's Northern lace industry and Scotland, lived in Paris where Edouard Wattez and his 3 siblings were brought up. He studied for a year at the Sorbonne University in Paris, before enrolling in the Paris Institut de Sciences Politiques ('Sciences Po') where he studied Public Law, Economics and Political Science. He also studied International law and Political Economy at Panthéon-Assas University.
In 1966, he served his civil service as a French teacher and Head of Cultural Affairs at the French Embassy in Malawi for two years. He moved back to Paris to take on a position in the Banque Nordique de Commerce, which he left after 3 years, definitely renouncing to a banking career after having found his calling in Third World Development. His first appointment following this professional U-turn was at the United Nations as a United Nations Development Programme (‘UNDP’) Programme Officer & Assistant General Representative for Senegal, Mauritania and Gambia, based in Dakar, Senegal, leading large-scale governance and public administration reforms in the region.
Just before departing to Dakar in 1971, he met his future wife Genevieve Jeanne Massip in New York, the daughter a Colonel Marcel Massip and niece of French journalist Roger Massip and French writer and 1963 Prix Interallié winner Renée Massip. They married in Dakar in 1972 and in 1973 arrived their first and only child, Garance, born on Dakar's Gorée island.

1978–1987 – the early years in Fiji and New-York
In 1978, he moves with his family to the Fiji islands to become the United Nations Development Programme deputy representative and then representative for Pacific Operations.
In 1982, he transferred to the United Nations headquarters in New-York as Senior Regional Project Officer of the regional bureau for Asia and the Pacific and then as Senior Officer for Emergency Operations in Africa.

1987–1990 – the Rwanda years
He moved back to Africa, in Kigali (Rwanda) in 1987 as UNDP resident representative just prior to the 1990 period of unrest which laid the foundations for the 1994 Rwandan genocide, setting up and implementing the UN's security plans and coordinating local agencies.

1990–1994 – the Cambodia years
In 1990, he was put in charge of re-opening the Phnom Penh Office of the UN in Cambodia which had been shut down following the 1975 Khmer Rouge-led civil war and genocide which had led to the shutting down of most multilateral agencies. He stayed there until signing of the October 1991 Paris Peace Accords.
As a UN Resident Coordinator and UNDP Resident Representative in Phnom Penh he fully re-established the UNDP/UN presence in the country as he launched the first very large post-war UNDP Programme of US$140 mln, over 5 years.
Under the aegis of the UNHCR and with the International Labour Organization, he coordinated the repatriation and resettlement of 450,000 returnees from the Thai border (CARERE Programme). In collaboration with the UNTAC (UN Transitional Authority for Cambodia) led by Under Secretary-General Yasushi Akashi and the United Nations Volunteers (UNV), he contributed to organising the first general democratic elections.

1995–1997 – the Jerusalem years
As a Special Representative of the UNDP Administrator in Jerusalem, he was responsible for the Programme of Assistance to the Palestinian People (PAPP) in the Palestinian territories, based in East Jerusalem. Programmes covered the West Bank and Gaza. In light of the local intricate political situation, UNDP’s programme of assistance to the Palestinian People served as a channel for several multi-bi programmes, especially for Japanese and Nordic funds.

1997–2001 – the Vietnam years
In Vietnam, UNDP provides support essentially at the policy level in the sectors of Public Administration, Environment, Legal reform, Trade, Macroeconomic policies and Socio-Economic Planning. Special responsibilities are assigned by the government to the UN Resident Coordinator for the overall coordination of Technical Assistance (TA) to the country.
As UN Resident Coordinator / UNDP Resident Representative, a mandate he led while Kofi Annan was the organisation General Secretary and was eventually awarded his Nobel Peace Prize, he maintained UNDP as a neutral, “alternative” policy adviser to the Authorities, up to the highest levels, he reinforced both the UNDP/UN dialogue with the government on key policy options available and the dialogue among multi-bi donors, in terms of coordination of external assistance.

UN Representative in Vietnam Edouard Wattez in 2000

Edouard Wattez also maintained close partnership between UN Agencies & International Financial Institutions (WB, IMF, ADB), organised direct participation in World Bank Consultative groups for Vietnam, and launched a “result-based” new UNDP Cooperation Programme with Vietnam (2001–2005)
He led, as UN Resident Coordinator, the elaboration of the “first generation” of UN joint planning tools: Common Country Assessment (CCA), UN Development Assistance Framework (UNDAF), Millennium Development Goals Report, etc.

2001–2003 - Sri Lanka and back to New York
Just prior to retiring from the UN in 2003, Edouard Wattez led a UN Inter-Agency Team for Peace-Building in Sri Lanka for the UN Secretary General on the technical assistance needs in connection with the ongoing peace process

After-2003 - Paris
Following retiring from the UN in 2003, Edouard Wattez led some assignments for the Ministry of Foreign Affairs and International Development (France), with a focus on 'Technical Assistance'.

== Awards and recognition ==
Edouard Wattez received a number of awards and honours, including the French Legion d'honneur in 2001.

== Career chronology ==
- 1964–1965: Société Française de Construction, Paris, France
- 1966–1968: French Volunteer in East Africa, Blantyre, Malawi
- 1968–1971: Banque Nordique de Commerce (International Scandinavian bank), Paris, France
- 1971–1975: United Nations Development Programme (‘Undp’) Programme Officer & Assistant Regional Representative (coverage included Mauritania and Gambia) [Dakar], [Senegal]
- 1975–1978: UNDP Area Officer, Division for West and Central Africa, Regional Bureau for Africa, New York City, USA (Headquarters)
- 1978–1982: UNDP Deputy Regional Representative for the South Pacific Suva, Fiji Islands
- 1982–1985: UNDP Senior Regional Project Officer, Regional Bureau for Asia and the Pacific New York, USA (Headquarters)
- 1985–1987: Senior Officer, United Nations Office for Emergency Operations in Africa (OEOA) New York City, USA (Headquarters)
- 1987–1990: UNDP Resident Representative / UN Resident Coordinator (first assignment as UNDP Head of mission) Kigali, Rwanda
- 1990–1991: Officer-in-Charge, UNDP Liaison Office, [Phnom Penh], [Cambodia]
- 1991–1994: United Nations Resident Coordinator / UNDP Resident Representative, Phnom Penh, Cambodia
- 1995–1997: Special Representative of the UNDP Administrator, Jerusalem
- 1997–2001: United Nations Resident Coordinator / UNDP Resident Representative (Director level, D2) Hanoi, Vietnam
- 2001–2003: United Nations Inter-Agency Team Leader for Peace-Building in Sri Lanka
- 2003–2004: Independent Senior Advisor to the French Government High Council for International Development (HCCI); to the French Ministry of Foreign Affaires; to the High Council for International Development (HCCI); to the Riparian member countries of the [Mekong River Commission] (MRC), Cambodia; and to United Nations Development Assistance Framework for the People’s Republic of China, Beijing, China
