= Jean Daujat =

French philosopher

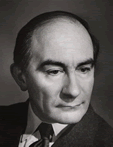
- Born: 27 October 1906; Paris, France
- Died: 31 May 1998 (aged 91)
- Occupation: Theologian
- Spouse: Sonia Hansen

Jean Daujat (Paris, 27 October 1906 – 31 May 1998) was a French philosopher of neo-Thomism, a disciple of Jacques Maritain, and the founder of the Centre d'études religieuses, the Center for Religious Studies, specializing in teaching Christian doctrine.

== Biography ==
=== Early life and education ===
Jean Daujat was born on 27 October 1906, in Paris to parents who were non-practicing believers. Daujat was home schooled by his mother until he entered the Lycee Pasteur in 1918. He obtained a BA in philosophy, with honors in mathematics.

In September 1923, Daujat entered Lycée Janson-de-Sailly where he studied mathematics. Meanwhile, his former high school biology teacher Pastor Jules Lefevre directed him toward the philosophy of Saint Thomas Aquinas. Daujat also discovered the philosophy of Jacques Maritain, who greatly influenced his own work. Jules Lefevre then introduced him to Amédée d'Yvignac, who had founded the French Gazette, which was subtitled "organ of Christian politics." Jean Daujat collaborated in this review along with Maritain, Henri Massis and Henri Gheon.

=== Center for Religious Studies ===
In the fall of 1925 Jean Daujat and a group of seven men began the Centre d'études religieuses. The creation of the Centre d'études religieuses would be the focus his work for the rest of his life.

In 1926, Jean Daujat entered the Ecole Normale Superieure to study science. Classmates included Étienne Borne and Merleau-Ponty in the literature department, the mathematician Chevalley, and the physicist and geneticist Rosenfeld Heir. Other influential men who attended alongside Daujat were Raymond Aron, Paul Nizan, Jean-Paul Sartre, Henri Cartan and Jean Dieudonné, two of the founders of the Bourbaki group, Louis Neel, Nobel Prize laureate in physics, Olivier Lacombe, also a disciple of Jacques Maritain and specialist in Oriental languages, Henri-Irénée Marrou, Maurice Bardeche, Robert Brasillach, Thierry Maulnier and Simone Weil.

During this period, Daujat continued his philosophical and spiritual training. With Maritain, he became acquainted with Vladimir Ghika, a Romanian prince who became a Catholic priest. Daujat dedicated a book to Ghika some fifty years later, as well as Father Garrigou-Lagrange. For several years he has collaborated with writer Yvonne ERC Estienne.

=== Marriage ===
In 1930 Daujat married Danish painter Sonia Hansen, a talented portraitist and landscape painter.

=== Work ===
In 1931, Daujat began teaching himself at the Centre d'études religieuses, supported by Cardinal Verdier. He begins to write a treatise on theology and spirituality, The Supernatural Life, which appeared in 1938 with a preface by Archbishop Beaussart and Father Garrigou-Lagrange. In 1933 he founded the Monthly Magazine which was published until 1939. In addition to its own articles and those of Yvonne Estienne, there were many prestigious authors who wrote for the magazine, such as Father Garrigou-Lagrange, Mgt Ghika, Father Lallement, Jacques Maritain, Henri Gheon, Charles Du Bos, Stanislas Broth, Robert of Harcourt, Gustave Thibon, Henriette Charasson, Olivier Lacombe, Merleau-Ponty, and Jacques Madaule. Daujat published several books on philosophy and theology. In 1970 The Christian Social Order. And In 1974 Y a-t-il une Verite? was published.

After the war, his teaching affected thousands of students. He wrote for several magazines like The New Man or The Catholic France. He published over thirty books, some of which were translated into several languages. In December 1946, he defended a thesis on the history of science on the theory of electric and magnetic phenomena before a jury that included Gaston Bachelard and Louis de Broglie. He published two books on the philosophy of science: Modern Physics and Traditional Philosophy.

Because of a Communist threat he received after publishing a booklet showing the perversion of communism, which sold hundreds of thousands of copies, Daujat was asked to speak at numerous conferences on this subject. He published his last book in 1996.

== Works ==
=== Theology ===
- The Faith Applied
- The Theology of Grace
- Prayer
- La Face Interne de L'histoire
- Y a-t-il une Verite?
