= Henri Ghéon =

French playwright, novelist, poet and critic

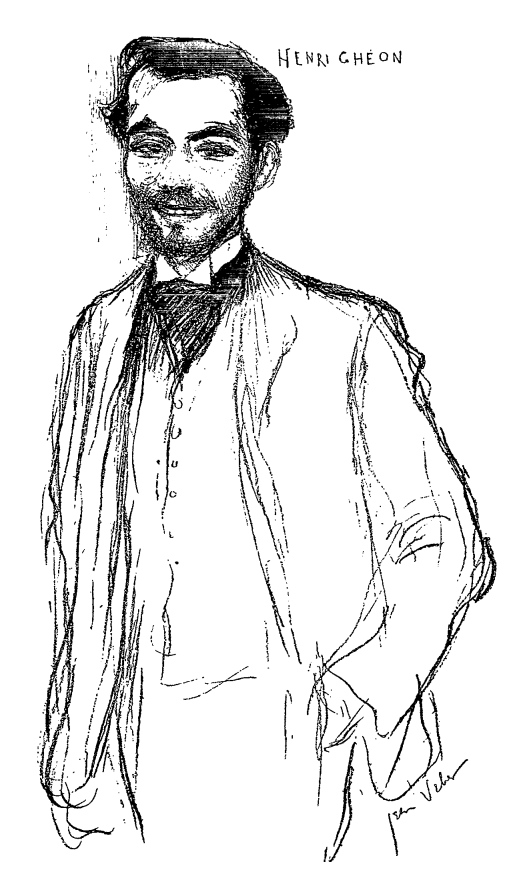
Henri Ghéon by Jean Veber

Henri Ghéon (15 March 1875 – 13 June 1944), born Henri Vangeon in Bray-sur-Seine, Seine-et-Marne, was a French playwright, novelist, poet and critic.

== Biography ==
Brought up by a devout Roman Catholic mother, he lost his faith in his early teens, while still at the Lycée in Sens. Among the factors that brought this about, one stood out in his own mind: at school religion was taught without life or understanding. Ghéon did not miss it. As F. J. Sheed says, "His was a happy atheism." He replaced Catholicism with a semi-pagan cult of beauty in all its forms — nature, literature, music, painting.

He moved to Paris in 1893 to study medicine. Around the same time, he started to write poetry, along with his colleagues Francis Jammes and Stéphane Mallarmé. He also published avant garde criticism. In 1887 he met André Gide, who became his literary guide and friend for twenty years. Ghéon, writes Gide's biographer Alan Sheridan, "was Gide's closest friend and companion on innumerable homosexual exploits." Ghėon actually drafted a militant text in favour of homosexuality, La Vie secrète de Guillaume Arnoult, which was one of the inspirations for Gide's Corydon. In 1909 they were founding members of the Nouvelle Revue Française (NRF). Ghéon also painted, studied music and travelled widely.

It was the sceptic Gide who occasioned the first cracks in Ghéon's paganism when he invited him to visit Florence with him in 1912. There Ghéon discovered the religious art of Giotto and Fra Angelico and was overwhelmed to the point of shedding tears. "At St Mark's," he wrote, "with Christ dying on the cross and the Virgin waiting for the angel in a bare and silent corridor..., even our senses had a soul. Art had transported me before, but never so high."

He served as an army doctor in the First World War. During this period he regained his Catholic faith, as described in his work L'homme né de la guerre (The Man Born from the War). His conversion was bound up with a devoutly Catholic naval officer, Pierre Dominique Dupouey, whom he met only three times in the space of a few weeks, but who impressed him greatly. It was again Gide who was the occasion for this fateful encounter: when Ghéon left for the Belgian front, Gide urged him to try to find Dupouey, who had once been his disciple and with whom he still corresponded. On Holy Saturday, 1915, Dupouey was killed in action on the Yser. By Christmas, Ghéon had returned to the Catholic faith and rejected his former homosexual life as sinful.

He founded the "Compagnons de Notre Dame" (Companions of Our Lady), a sort of amateur theatre confraternity of young people, for which he wrote over 60 plays, usually on episodes from the Gospel or the lives of the saints. Ghéon's plays had clear similarities with the medieval mystery and miracle plays. The Companions of Our Lady performed with success in Paris and throughout France, as well as in Belgium, Holland and Switzerland, and Ghéon was awarded a prize for his work by the Académie française. He also wrote poems, saints' biographies, and novels, among them a three-part work, Les Jeux de l'enfer et du ciel (Games of Hell and Heaven), centred on the Curè d'Ars.

Ghéon died of cancer in a Paris clinic on 13 June 1944, a week after the Allied landing in Normandy and six days after the opening of his most recent play, Saint Gilles.

== Reputation ==
In 2008 the writer and philosopher Fabrice Hadjadj, reviewing Catherine Boschian-Campaner's biography of Ghéon in Le Figaro, wrote, "Henri Ghėon is not a minor writer and his work speaks for itself. If his novels recall Dickens, his theatre loses nothing in comparison with Anouilh and Giraudoux. It was he alone who, in the first half of the 20th century, revived the popular burlesque and verticality of the medieval mystery plays, thus anticipating Dario Fo."

His Miroir de Peine was set to music by Hendrik Andriessen.

André Caplet's oratorio-like Le Miroir de Jésus composed in September 1923 uses texts by Ghéon as meditations on the fifteen decades of the rosary. The chorus announces each section's title but the female soloist delivers most of the text. The music of the central movements that take Christ's passion as their subject are, according to one commentator, "remarkable for its restraint as for its dissonance".

== Works ==
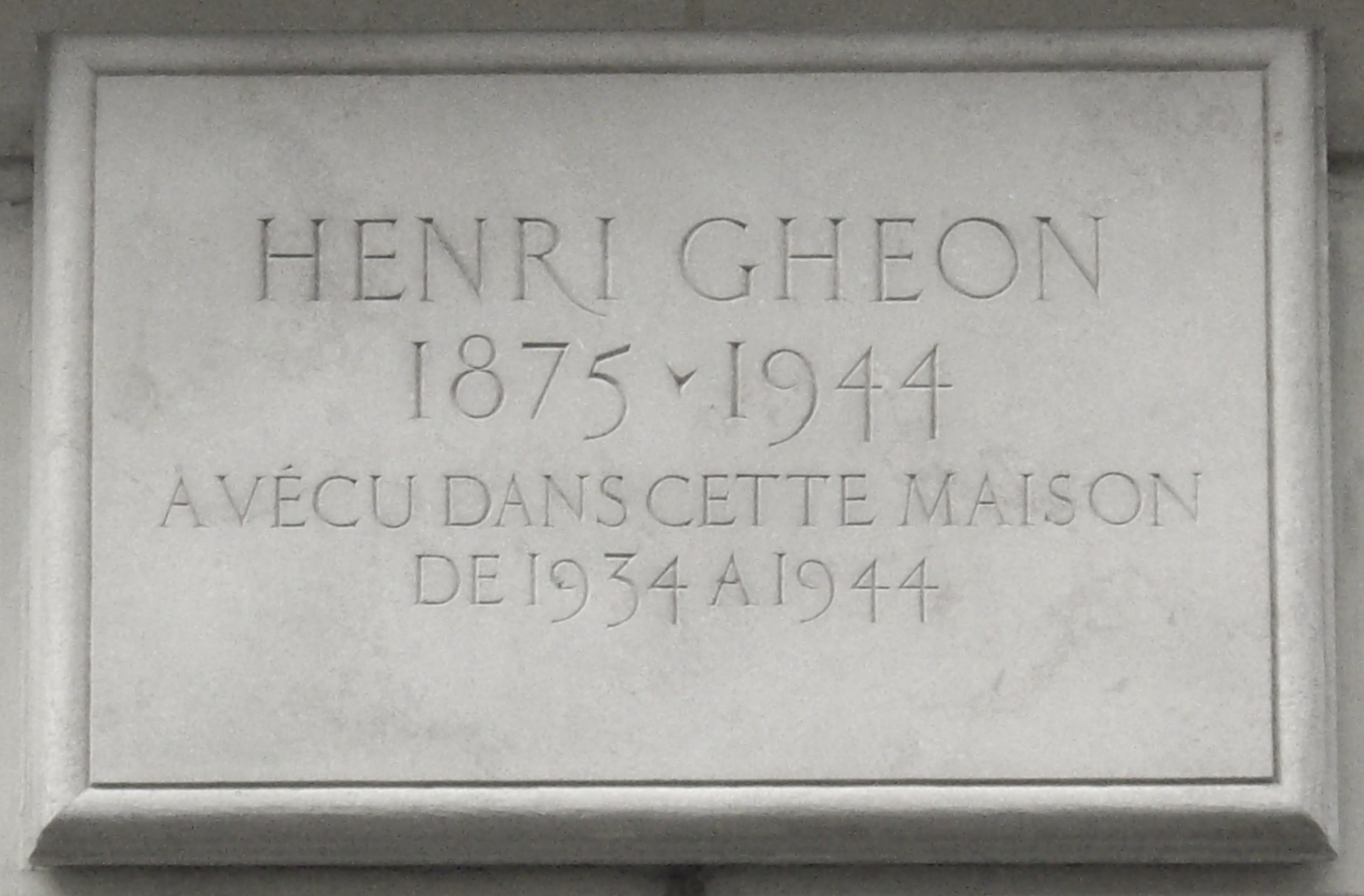
Memorial plaque on Henri Ghéonat's Paris home 68 rue Saint-Didier

- La Solitude de l'été. Les campagnes simples (1897)
- Le Pain. Tragédie populaire en 4 actes et 5 tableaux (1912)
- Foi en la France poèmes du temps de guerre per patriam ad dominum (1916)
- L'Homme né de la guerre (1919, rev. 1926)
- Le Pauvre sous l'escalier. Trois Épisodes d'après la vie de saint Alexis (1920, rev. 1925)
- Jeux et miracles pour le peuple fidèle (1922)
- Partis Pris. Réflexions sur l'art littéraire (1923)
- La Bergère au pays des loups (1923)
- Les Trois Miracles de Sainte Cécile (1923)
- La Merveilleuse Histoire du jeune Bernard de Menthon. En trois journées et un épilogue (1924)
- Le Triomphe de Saint Thomas d'Aquin (1924)
- Le Comédien et la grâce, pièce d'après la vie de Saint Genès (1925)
- La Parade du Pont du diable d'après la légende de Saint Kado (1926)
- La Vie Profonde de Saint François d'Assise (1926)
- Les Trois Sagesses du vieux Wang (1927)
- Demos esclave et roi (1927)
- La Fille du sultan et le bon jardinier. Conte en trois tableaux d'après une chanson flamande (1928)
- Les Jeux de l'enfer et du ciel (1929)
- La Vieille Dame des rues (roman), Fkammarion, (1930)
- Sainte Anne d'Auray (1931)
- Épiphanie ou le voyage des trois rois (1931)
- Promenades avec Mozart, l'homme, l'œuvre, le pays (1932)
- Le Saint Curé d'Ars (1933)
- Sainte Thérèse de Lisieux (1934)
- Le Noël sur la place ou les enfances de Jésus (1935)
- Noêl ! Noël ! (1935)
- Saint Jean Bosco (1935)
- Féerie le petit Poucet, impromptu en trois actes pour les enfants (1935)
- Les Détours imprévus (1937)
- La Quête héroïque du Graal. Action romanesque et féerique en cinq parties et dix tableaux (1938)
- Marie, Mère de Dieu (1939)
- Saint Vincent Ferrier (1940)
- Saint Martin (1941)
- Sainte Claire d'Assise (1944)
- Judith. Œdipe ou le crépuscule des dieux
- L'Art du théâtre
- Dramaturgie d'hier et de demain
- La Cathédrale Incendiée, music by Albert Alain
- Correspondance Henri Ghéon - André Gide, t. 1 1897–1903, t. II 1904–1944, Paris : Gallimard, NRF, 1976
- Correspondance Vielé-Griffin - Ghéon, édition critique edited by Catherine Boschian-Campaner, Paris : H. Champion, 2004 (ISBN 2-7453-0982-X)

== Bibliography ==
- Henri Brochet, Henri Ghéon, Les presses d'Ile-de-France, 1946
- Maurice Deléglise, Le théâtre d'Henri Ghéon : Contribution à l'étude du renouveau théâtral, Sion, 1947
- Geneviève Duhamelet, Henri Ghéon. L'homme né de la guerre. Foyer Notre-Dame (Coll. « Convertis du XXe siècle », 1), Bruxelles 1951.
- Jacques Maritain, Henri Ghéon, dans Œuvres complètes, volume III, p. 1314-1317, éditions universitaires Fribourg Suisse, éditions Saint Paul Paris, 1984
- Catherine Boschian-Campaner, Henri Ghéon, camarade de Gide : Biographie d'un homme de désirs, Presses de la Renaissance, 2008 ISBN 978-2750904067
