= Joseph Delteil =

French writer and poet (1894–1978)

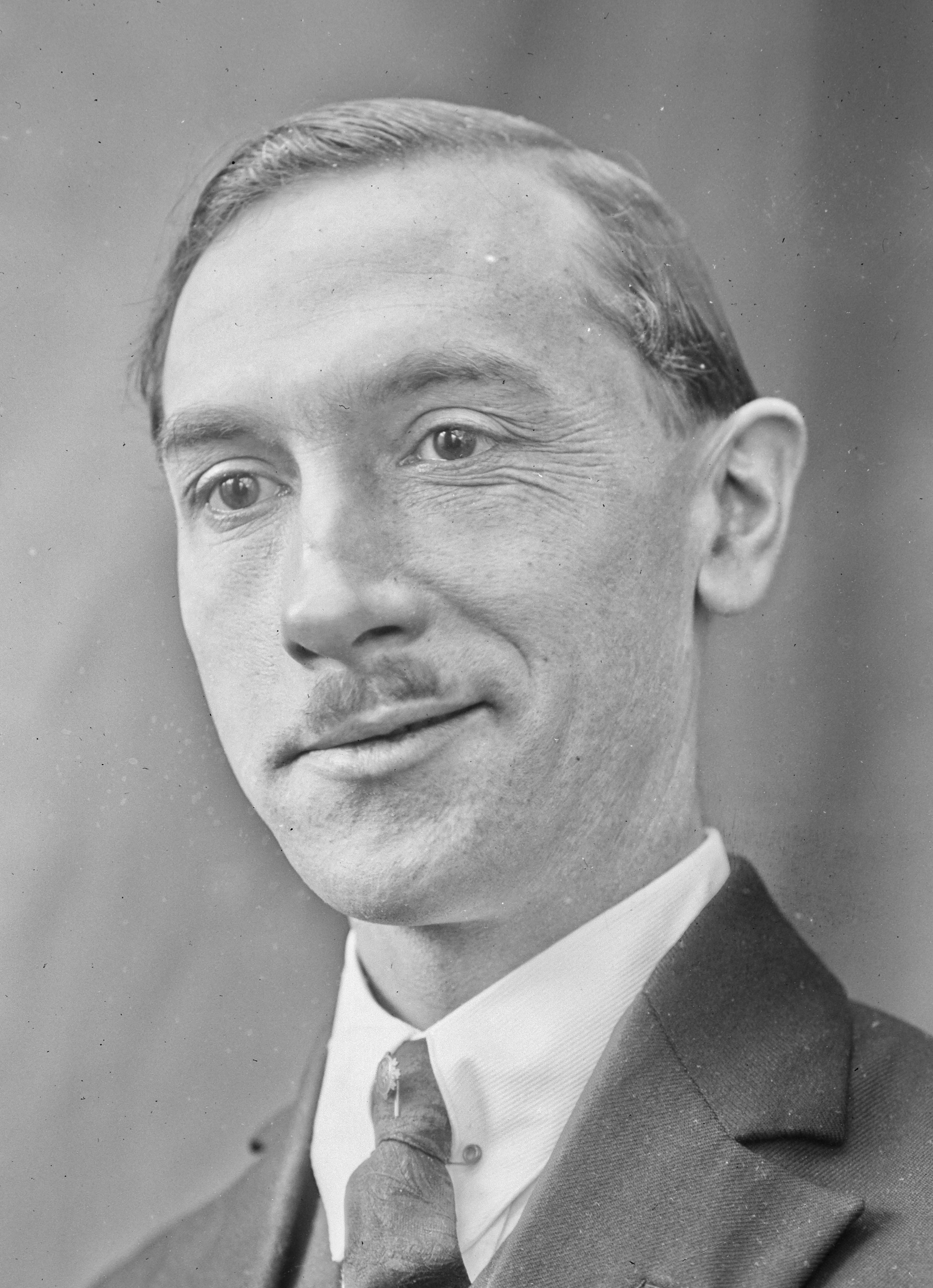
- Born: 20 April 1894; Villar-en-Val in Aude, France
- Died: 16 April 1978 (aged 83); Grabels in Hérault, France
- Occupations: Writer; Poet

Joseph Delteil (French pronunciation: [ʒozɛf dɛltɛj]; 20 April 1894 – 16 April 1978) was a 20th-century French writer and poet.

== Biography ==
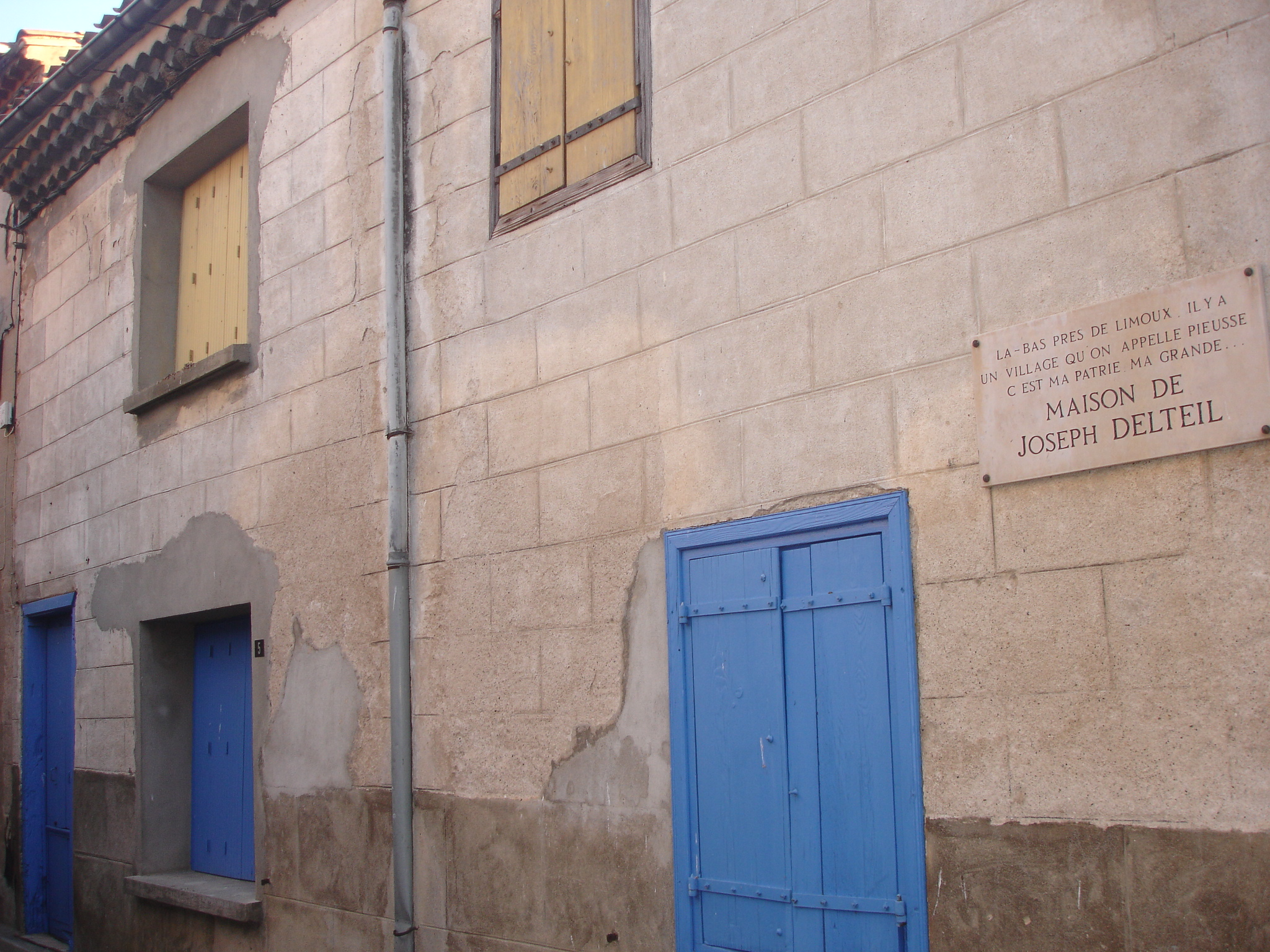
The inscription on the house of Joseph Delteil in Pieusse reads: LA - BAS PRES DE LIMOUX. IL Y A UN VILLAGE QU'ON APPELLE PIEUSSE C EST MA PATRIE MA GRANDE... MAISON DE JOSEPH DELTEIL

Joseph Delteil was born on the farm of La Pradeille, from a woodcutter-charcoal father and a "buissonnière" mother. Joseph Delteil spent the first four years of his childhood at the Borie (construction of dry stones) of Guillamau, 30 kilometres south of Carcassonne, in the Val de Dagne. Of this hovel, today there remain only stumps of walls, which one can always see while hiking on the "Path in poetry" at the entrance of which one reads "Here the time goes on foot" created by Magalie Arnaud, mayor of Villar-en-Val, and her friends to honour the memory of the poet.

In 1898, his father purchased a vineyard plot at Pieusse (30 kilometres further on the side of Limoux). This was, according to Delteil, his "native village", in the heart of the land of the Blanquette de Limoux, "where the landscape grows, from the forest to the sun, from Occitan to French ". He remained there until his Certificat d'études primaires (1907), then he joined the Saint-Louis school in Limoux. He was then a student at the Collège Saint-Stanislas (small seminary) in Carcassonne.

The publication in 1922 of his first novel Sur le fleuve Amour attracted the attention of Louis Aragon and Andre Breton for whom this work "compensated for so many devils to the body." Delteil collaborated with the magazine Literature and participated in the drafting of the pamphlet Un cadavre written in response to the national funeral of Anatole France (October 1924). Breton quotes him in his Surrealist Manifesto as one of those who have done "an act of absolute surrealism."

On 24 May 1924, at the "Soirée du Claridge" where the former Russian Page Corps was giving a charity ball, a fashion show with costumes by Sonia Delaunay illustrated a poem by Joseph Delteil La Mode qui vient. "The appearance of this group raised the applause of the social gathering".

The publication in 1925 of his Jeanne d'Arc, a work rewarded by the Prix Femina, aroused the rejection of the Surrealists and of Breton in particular, in spite of the scandal caused by the anti-conformist vision Of the Maid of Orleans. For Breton, this work was a "vast shit". Delteil participated in the first issue of La Révolution surréaliste, but after an interview in which he declared that he never dreamed, he received a letter of rupture from Breton.

In 1931, he fell seriously ill and left literature and Parisian life for the south of France. In 1937, he settled in the Tuilerie de Massane (in Grabels) near Montpellier where he led a peasant-writer life until his death, accompanied by his wife, Caroline Dudley, who was the creator of the Revue nègre.

In his Occitan retreat, he maintained strong friendships with writers (Henry Miller), poets (Frédéric Jacques Temple)), singers (Charles Trenet, Georges Brassens), painters (Pierre Soulages), and actors (Jean-Claude Drouot). By publishing La Deltheillerie in 1968, he regained some of the notoriety of 1920, supported by personalities like Jacques Chancel, Jean-Louis Bory, Michel Polac, and Jean-Marie Drot.

He is buried, along with his wife Caroline, in the Pieusse cemetery.

== Works ==
- 1919: Le Cœur grec
- 1921: Le Cygne androgyne
- 1922: Sur le Fleuve Amour
- 1923: Choléra
- 1924: Les Cinq sens
- 1925: Jeanne d'Arc, (novel), Prix Femina)
- 1925: Le Discours aux oiseaux par Saint François d'Assise
- 1925: Les Poilus
- 1926: Mes amours...(...spirituelles)
- 1926: Allo ! Paris
- 1926: Ode à Limoux
- 1927: Perpignan
- 1927: La Jonque de porcelaine
- 1928: La Fayette
- 1928: Le Mal de cœur
- 1928: De J.-J. Rousseau à Mistral
- 1929: Il était une fois Napoléon
- 1929: Les Chats de Paris
- 1930: La Belle Corisande
- 1930: La Belle Aude
- 1930: Don Juan
- 1931: La Nuit des bêtes
- 1931: Le Vert Galant
- 1944: A la Belle étoile
- 1947: Jésus II
- 1960: François d'Assise
- 1961: Œuvres complètes
- 1964: La Cuisine paléolithique - éditions Robert Morel, Grand Prix international de littérature gastronomique 1965
- 1968: La Deltheillerie
- 1976: Le sacré corps
- 1980: Correspondance privée Henry Miller-Joseph Delteil, Paris, Pierre Belfond, 1980 (foreword, translation and notes by Frédéric Jacques Temple)
- 1990: Musée de marine
- 1994: Les Prisonniers de l'infini
- 1995: Le Maître ironique
- 2005: L'Homme coupé en morceaux

== Studies devoted to Joseph Delteil ==
- André de Richaud, Vie de saint Delteil, Paris, La Nouvelle Société d'Édition, 1928.
- Maryse Choisy, Delteil tout nu, Paris, éd. Montaigne, 1930.
- Christian Chabanis, « Joseph Delteil au cœur du monde » in Le Figaro Littéraire, 30 December 1961.
- Claude Schmitt, « Joseph Delteil ou l'épithète introuvable » in revue L'Honneur, 1970.
- Collective under the direction of Claude Schmitt, Delteil est au ciel !, Alfred Eibel Éditeur, 1979.
- Robert Briatte, Joseph Delteil, coll. « Qui êtes-vous ? », Lyon, La Manufacture, 1988.
- Jean-Marie Drot, Joseph Delteil prophète de l'an 2000, Imago, 1990.
- Jean-Louis Malves, Delteil en habit de lumière, Éditions Loubatières, 1992
- Collectif s/d de Robert Briatte, Les Aventures du récit chez Joseph Delteil, Montpellier, Éd. de la Jonque/Presses du Languedoc, 1995
- Collective under the direction of Denitza Bantcheva, Joseph Delteil, coll. « Les Dossiers H », L'Âge d'homme, 1998.
- Denis Wetterwald, Joseph Delteil. Les escales d'un marin étrusque, Christian Pirot éditeur, 1999.
- Guy Darol, Joseph Delteil brille pour tout le monde, Samuel Tastet éditeur, 2006.
- Marie-Françoise Lemonnier-Delpy, Joseph Delteil : une œuvre épique au XXe, destinées du héros et révolution du récit, Éditions IDECO, 2006.
- « Les Riches heures de Joseph Delteil » Metz, imprimerie Jean Vodaine, 1977. Triple issue (23,24,25) of the journal Dire. Typographie au plomb par Arthur Praillet. Pur chiffon de Lana. 50 copies.
