= Charles Le Quintrec =

French poet (1926–2008)

Charles Le Quintrec (14 March 1926 – 14 November 2008) was a French and Breton poet and writer. He was born in Plescop, in Morbihan and died in Lorient in Brittany.

Le Quintrec was a literary critic for Ouest-France .

== Awards ==
- Chevalier des Arts et Lettres
- Officer of the Ordre national du Mérite
- Knight of the Legion of Honor
- Max Jacob Prize
- Apollinaire Prize
- Grand Prize for poetry of the Académie française
- Grand Prize of the Société des gens de lettres for his body of work,
- 1990 Prix Goncourt poetry
- 2007 Grand prix catholique de littérature

== Works ==
- Les Enfants de Kerfontaine, Albin Michel, 2007
- Demain dès l'aube: Journal IV 1994-2004, Albin Michel, 2006
- Terre océane, Albin Michel, 2006
- Le Pèlerin de Saint-Roch, Albin Michel, 2004 et Le Livre De Poche, 2006
- Un Breton à Paris, Albin Michel, 2002 et Libra Diffusio, 2004
- La Saison du bourreau, Albin Michel, 2001
- La Fête bretonne, Ouest-France, 2000
- L'Enfant de Brocéliande, Albin Michel, 2000
- Une Enfance bretonne, Albin Michel, 2000 et Le Livre De Poche, 2002
- Des Matins dans les ronces, Albin Michel, 2000
- Vents d'étoiles, Liv'Editions, 1998
- Danses et chants pour Elisane, Albin Michel, 1998
- L'Empire des fougères, Albin Michel, 1998 et Le Livre De Poche, 2000
- L'Espérance de la nuit: Journal, 1985-1993, Albin Michel, 1996
- La Traversée du lac, Albin Michel, 1995
- Littérature de Bretagne, Ouest-France, 1992
- Des Enfants de lumière, Albin Michel, 1992 et Liv'Editions, 1995
- La Querelle de Dieu, Albin Michel, 1992 et Le Livre De Poche, 2000
- Belle-Ile en mer, Ed. Maritimes et d'Outre Mer, 1991
- La Source et le Secret, Albin Michel, 1990
- Les Nuits du Parc-Lann, Albin Michel, 1990 et Le Livre De Poche, 2000
- Bretagne est univers, Ouest-France, 1988
- Les Lumières du soir: journal, 1980-1985, Albin Michel, 1987
- Chanticoq, Albin Michel, 1986 et Le Livre De Poche, 2000
- Les Ombres du jour, Albin Michel, 1985
- Lourdes. Champ Vallon. 1984. ISBN 978-2-903528-39-3.
- La Bretagne de Charles Le Quintrec, Christine Bonneton éditeur, 1984
- Le Règne et le royaume, Albin Michel, 1983
- Le Christ aux orties, Albin Michel, 1982
- The Stones of Carnac, Ouest-France, 1981
- Le Village allumé, Éditions Saint-Germain-des-Prés, 1981
- La Lumière et l'argile, 1981 et Albin Michel, 2000
- Anthologie de la poésie bretonne 1880-1980, Table ronde, 1980
- Les Grandes heures littéraires de Bretagne, Ouest-France, 1978
- Le Château d'amour, Albin Michel, 1977
- Jeunesse de Dieu, Albin Michel, 1974
- La Ville en loques, Albin Michel, 1972
- La Marche des arbres, Albin Michel, 1970 Grand prix international de poésie
- Un Buisson d'alléluias, 1969
- Les Grands habits, Subervie, 1968
- Stances du verbe Amour, Albin Michel, 1966
- Le Chemin noir, Albin Michel, 1968
- Le Mur d'en face, Le Cercle du Nouveau Livre, 1965
- Alain Bosquet, Seghers, 1964
- La Maison du Moustoir, Albin Michel, 1964
- Le Droit au témoignage, 1963
- La Lampe du corps, Albin Michel, 1962
- Le Dieu des chevaux, Albin Michel, 1962
- Les Chemins de Kergrist, Albin Michel, 1959 et 1996
- Les Noces de la terre, Grasset, 1957
- Les Temps obscurs, René Debresse Éditeur, 1953
