= Dorian Malovic =

French journalist

Dorian Malovic is a French journalist. He has been head of the "Asia" department of the daily La Croix in Paris since 1997 and French writer, specializing on China. He was a press correspondent in Hong Kong for various media. He has contributed to various books, programmes and conferences on the theme of Asia.

== Life ==
In the 1990s, “without speaking or reading chinese mandarin”, he became a China-focused correspondent for various media outlets. Then, in 1997, he became head of the “Asia” desk at the daily newspaper La Croix in Paris.

He's winner of the 2007 Grand prix catholique de littérature.

== Works ==
- Hong Kong, un destin chinois, Bayard Presse, 1997.
- Mgr Zen, un homme en colère, interviews with the Cardinal of Hong Kong Joseph Zen, Bayard, 2007.
- Évadés de Corée du Nord, témoignages with Juliette Morillot, Presses de la Cité, Éditions Belfond, Paris, 2004.
- Le Pape jaune : Mgr Jin Luxian, soldat de Dieu en Chine communiste, written with the advice of the sinologist Simon Leys, Éditions Perrin, 2006.
- Huo Datong, La Chine sur le divan with Dorian Malovic, Plon, 2008.
- China Love, Éditions Tallandier, 2016.
- La Corée du Nord en 100 questions with Juliette Morillot, Tallandier, 2016.

== Prizes ==
- Grand prix catholique de littérature, 2007, for Le Pape jaune
- Prix du meilleur livre géopolitique 2018.
