= Patrice de La Tour du Pin =

French writer and poet (1911-1975)

Count Patrice de La Tour du Pin (16 March 1911 – 28 October 1975) was a twentieth century French poet and hymnodist.

== Biography ==
Patrice de La Tour du Pin was born in Paris, the third child and second son of François de La Tour du Pin Chambly de La Charce (1878-1914), lieutenant in the 298th infantry regiment, and Brigitte O'Connor (1880-1948).

On his paternal side, he was descended from René de La Tour du Pin Gouvernet, and his family was one of the oldest and most powerful families of the Dauphiné, having for forefathers several dauphins of Viennois. His mother was descended from Arthur O'Connor and Condorcet.

Patrice was only three years old when his father was killed at the First Battle of the Marne, at the beginning of the First World War. Patrice, with his sister and older brother, was raised by his mother and grandmother; the family split its time between Paris and Le Bignon-Mirabeau in Gâtinais.

As a poet and a discreet Catholic mystic, he entered into dialogue with all the intellectual trends of the time, including atheist thought.

Il fait ses études à Sainte-Croix in Neuilly-sur-Seine, then at the lycée Janson-de-Sailly, and then at the École libre des sciences politiques.

He first drew the public eye through La Quête de joie ("The Quest for Joy") which he wrote in 1930 at 19 years old and published in 1933 at his own expense through Éditions de la Tortue, after Jules Supervielle had been unable to persuade the Nouvelle Revue française to accept the manuscript. This collection contains the celebrated poem "Enfants de septembre" ("Children of September"). Then appeared, in the Cahiers de Barbarie collection edited at Tunis by Armand Guibert, L'Enfer ("Hell," 1935) and Le Lucernaire ("Lucernarium," 1936). He then began to publish the poems that he would later gather in Une somme de poésie ("A Summa of Poetry"). Le Don de la Passion ("The Gift of the Passion") appeared in 1937 in Cahiers des poètes catholiques, Les Psaumes ("Psalms") in 1938 from Gallimard, La Vie recluse en poésie ("The eremitic life in poetry") in 1938 from Plon, and Les Anges ("The Angels") was published in 1939 in Tunis.

The Académie française awarded him the prix Maurice-Trubert in 1938.

Mobilized in World War II, he was taken prisoner during the Phoney War on 17 October 1939 and was held in Oflag IV-D, where he stayed for three years. Throughout his captivity, he continued to write the poems which would become the first part of the Somme; this internment would become the most artistically productive period of his life. He was liberated on 21 October 1943. On his return, he married his cousin Anne de Pierre de Bernis Calvière, member of the noble and influential Pierre de Bernis family, and continued work on the Somme de poésie.

After the war, he lived with his wife Anne and their four daughters at Bignon. He continued to work discreetly on the Somme, which would not be published in its full three-volume form until 1981-1983.

In 1963, he moved to Paris, where he published the Petit Théâtre crépusculaire, the beginning of the third volume of Une somme de poésie.

In 1970 he published Une lutte pour la vie ("A Fight For Life") for which he received the Grand prix catholique de littérature. In 1974 came Psaumes de tous mes temps, ninety psalms of his own composition.

He died in Paris on 28 October 1975 at the age of 64. His wife died in 2015 at 94 years old. He was interred in the O'Connor family section near their chapel in the cimetière du Bignon-Mirabeau.

== Translation work ==
La Tour du Pin played an important role in the translation of the Bible for the francophone Catholic liturgy, after the decision of Vatican II to convert the Mass to the vernacular. He was a member, alone with Joseph Gelineau, Pierre-Marie Gy, Aimon-Marie Roguet and Didier Rimaud, of a Litugical Commission for the Elaboration of New Compositions, created with this aim. From 1964 on, he took part in the editing of the Psalms in the framework of the Episcopal Liturgical Association for Francophone Countries. He also wrote many post-conciliar chants for the Liturgy of the Hours in French, set to music in many cases by Rimaud and Gelineau. His most notable chant without a doubt remains Amour qui planais sur les eaux (SECLI KP72-1, "Love that hovered over the waters"). His chants lend themselves best to a monastic environment, but it is not uncommon to hear them at Sunday Mass.

== Works ==
- "D'un aventurier". Poem in the literary review Mirages, Tunis. 1934.
- L'Enfer. Tunis, Cahiers de Barbarie, n° 7, 1ère série, 1935, 80p. Reprint with lithographs by Elie Grekoff, Paris, Éditions de Cluny, 1949
- Le Lucernaire. Tunis, Cahiers de Barbarie, n° 13, 2ème série, 1936, 82 pp.
- Les Anges. Tunis, éd. Monomotapa, 1939.
- Psaumes, Paris, Éditions Gallimard, 1938, ISBN 2070237605
- La Quête de joie, Gallimard, 1939 ISBN 2070237613 - Prix Mallarmé (which the author declined)
- Une somme de poésie, Gallimard, 1946, ISBN 2070237621.
- La Contemplation errante, Gallimard, 1948, ISBN 207023763X
- Le Second Jeu (Une somme de poésie, II), Gallimard, 1959, ISBN 2070237656
- Petit théâtre crépusculaire (Une somme de poésie, III), Gallimard, 1963, ISBN 2070237664
- Petite somme de poésie, Gallimard, 1967, ISBN 2070301583
- Une lutte pour la vie, Gallimard, 1970, ISBN 2070271498, Grand prix catholique de littérature 1971
- Psaumes de tous mes temps, Gallimard, 1974, ISBN 2070288072
- Une somme de poésie, Gallimard, 1981:
  - Tome I : Le Jeu de l'homme en lui-même, ISBN 2070250385
  - Tome II : Le Jeu de l'homme devant les autres, 1982, ISBN 2070223205
  - Tome III : Le Jeu de l'homme devant Dieu, 1983, ISBN 2070259773

== Studies ==
- Armand Guibert, Jean Amrouche, Anne Denis-Dagieu et Camille Bégué : Patrice de La Tour du Pin. Tunis, éd. de la revue Mirages, 1934, 136 pp.
- Daniel-Rops, L'oeuvre grandissante de Patrice de La Tour du Pin, (suivi du poème Les Anges de P. de la Tour du Pin), Paris, Desclée De Brouwer / Bruxelles, Éditions Universelles, 1942.
- Anne Biéville-Noyant, Patrice de La Tour du Pin, Paris, éd. de la Nouvelle Revue, 1948.
- Eva Kushner, Patrice de La Tour du Pin, Paris, éd. Seghers, coll. "Poètes d'aujourd'hui" (n°79), 1961.
- Colloque Patrice de La Tour du Pin, tenu à la Sorbonne le 21 et 22 novembre 1981, sous la direction d'Yves-Alain Favre, éd. A.-G. Nizet, 1983, 189 p., ISBN 978-2707810342.
- Patrice de La Tour du Pin : La Quête de joie au cœur d'Une somme de poésie, actes du colloque au Collège de France, 25-26 septembre 2003, réunis par Isabelle Renaud-Chamska, éd. Droz, Genève, 2005.
- Approches de l’incommunicable, par Albert Béguin, Esprit No. 128, 1946 (p. 881-888).
- Jacques Gauthier (1987). Patrice de La Tour du Pin, quêteur du Dieu de joie. Mediaspaul. p. 188. ISBN 978-2712202927..
- La Théopoésie de Patrice de La Tour du Pin, par Jacques Gauthier, éd. Bellarmin, Montréal / éd. du Cerf, Paris, 1989.
- Marie-Josette Le Han (2006). Paradigme biblique et expérience poétique : L'exemple de Patrice de La Tour du Pin. Presses Universitaires de Franche-Comté. ISBN 978-2848671413..
- L’Univers singulier de Patrice de La Tour du Pin, par Daniel Leuwers, La Nouvelle Revue Française, 355, juillet-août 1982 (p. 159-163).
- Luca Pietromarchi (2002). Les Anges sauvages : La quête de joie de Patrice de La Tour du Pin. Honore Champion. p. 304. ISBN 978-2745305527..
- Maurice Champagne. Éloge de La Quête de Joie suivi de Petite somme de Poésie. p. 251. ISBN 978-2070301584.
