= Franz Weyergans =

Désiré Marcel Weyergans, called Franz Weyergans (27 April 1912 – 8 February 1974) was a Belgian writer and translator of French language.

== Life ==
Born in Ougrée, he is the father of writer François Weyergans.

He was awarded the Grand prix catholique de littérature in 1958 for Les Gens heureux and the prix Victor-Rossel in 1969 for L’Opération.

== Works ==
- Raisons de vivre, Paris/Brussels, Éditions les Écrits, 1945, 176 p. BnF 31642391t
- Lettres à un jeune vivant, Paris, Éditions Pascal, 1946, 69 p. OCLC 800514079
- La Route et la Maison, Tournai, Belgium, Casterman, 1953, 175 p. BnF 316423925
- Pinocchio, after Carlo Collodi, ill. by Simone Baudoin, Tournai, Belgium, Éditions Casterman, 1954, 32 p. BnF 316423898
- Prairies, Paris, Éditions Pascal, 1954, 356 p. BnF 31642390g
- 36 ballons, ill. by Simone Baudoin, Paris, Casterman, coll. "Farandole", 1954, 19 p. BnF 31642394v
- Trois petits Noirs débrouillards, ill. by Simone Baudoin, Paris, Éditions Casterman, coll. "Farandole", 1954, 19 p. BnF 316423956
- L'Ours aimable, ill. by Robert Marsia, Paris, Casterman, coll. "Farandole", 1956, 19 p. BnF 31642387k
- Choix de poèmes contemporains à l'usage des classes de seconde, Paris, Éditions Universitaires, 1957, 188 p. BnF 31642384j
- Les Gens heureux, essay, Paris, Éditions Universitaires, 1957, 176 p. BnF 31642385w

- Grand prix catholique de littérature 1958

- Théâtre et roman contemporains, choix de textes à l'usage des classes de première, Paris, Éditions Universitaires, 1957, 272 p. BnF 31642393h
- Le Père Pire et l’Europe du cœur, Paris, Éditions Universitaires, 1958, 216 p. BnF 31642388x
- Le Bonheur à Venise, Paris, Éditions du Seuil, 1959, 190 p. BnF 316423836
- Mystiques parmi nous, Paris, Fayard, 1959, 127 p. BnF 316423867
- L’Amour fidèle, Paris, Éditions Universitaires, 1960, 215 p. BnF 332224709
- La Bibliothèque idéale des jeunes, Paris, Éditions Universitaires, 1960, 336 p. BnF 332224720
- Apprendre à lire, Paris, Éditions Universitaires, 1961, 202 p. BnF 33222471n
- Saint François d'Assise…, Tours, France, Alfred Mame et Fils, coll. "Votre nom, votre saint", 1962, 108 p. BnF 33222477q
- Enfants de ma patience, Paris, Éditions Universitaires, 1964, 167 p. OCLC 299930393
- Vie du docteur Tom Dooley…, ill. by Robert Marsia, Paris, Éditions Casterman, 1967, 174 p. BnF 332224782
- Mon amour dans l'île, Paris, Éditions Universitaires, 1968, 183 p. BnF 33222474p
- L’Opération, Paris, Éditions Julliard, 1968, 319 p. BnF 33222476c

- Prix Victor-Rossel 1969

- On dira cet hiver, Paris, Éditions Julliard, 1970, 255 p. BnF 35423877p
- Béguinages de Belgique, with Anne Zenoni, phot. by Michel Fischer, Brussels, Belgium, Éditions Paul Legrain, 1972, 190 p. BnF 34560777j
- La Grand-Place de Bruxelles, phot. by Michel Fischer, Brussels, Belgium, Éditions Paul Legrain, 1974, 182 p. BnF 345607766
