= Miklós Bátori =

Hungarian Roman Catholic writer (1919/20–1992)

Miklós Bátori, pen name of Miklós Bajomi (1919 or 1920 – 25 February 1992) was a Roman Catholic writer of Hungarian origin.

== Life ==
Born in Bátaszék (Hungary), in 1944 he published his first novel, Ingovány (literally: "Mudflat") in Budapest, still under the name Miklós Bajomi. He was taken prisoner of war in France in 1945, and enrolled at the Sorbonne after his release. He returned to Hungary in January 1947 for family reasons and then went on to study at a university in Budapest. He then taught in the provinces (from 1951 to 1956) in a technical high school in Győr where he was also director of the boarding school.

He fled Hungary after the crushing of the Hungarian Revolution of 1956 and moved to Paris. He was a member of the editorial board of the Hungarian literary and cultural magazine in Paris Ahogy Lehet and also wrote in other Hungarian emigration newspapers.

In 1960, he published in Hungarian Kálvária in Cologne (Calvary Road) after the address of his high school (in French Un étrange paradis), which describes the time when, as a teacher at Győr, he fled with a group of Catholics persecuted by the communist power and in 1961, A halál a szőlőskertben (literally: "Death in the vineyard"), which evokes the effort of Christians to recover, under a hostile regime, the purity of the early Church. This last book, translated and published in French in 1965 under the title Le Vignoble des saints, was awarded the Grand prix catholique de littérature.

In 1963, Les Briques is a novel from the last days of the Hungarian revolution.

In 1967, Les Va-nu-pieds de Dieu features the evangelist Mark who tells what he has seen throughout his life.

His following works were written directly in French.

Bátori died in Paris.

== Work ==
- Un étrange paradis, Plon, 1961 (translated from Hungarian) Kálvária, Cologne 1960)
- Les Briques, Éditions Robert Laffont, 1963 (translated from the Hungarian manuscript)
- Le Vignoble des saints, Robert Laffont, 1965 (translated from Hungarian A halál a szőlőskertben, Cologne 1961, Grand prix catholique de littérature.
- Les Va-nu-pieds de Dieu, Robert Laffont, 1967 (translated from the Hungarian manuscript ISBN 978-2221014745 (crowned by the Académie française)
- Le lièvre a pleuré, Robert Laffont, 1969, ISBN 2221014731
- La vie est un océan, Robert Laffont, 1973
- Bakfitty, Fayard, 1977
- Notre ami, Lazare (chronique), Éditions du Cerf, 1983)
