= Bátaszék =

- Town
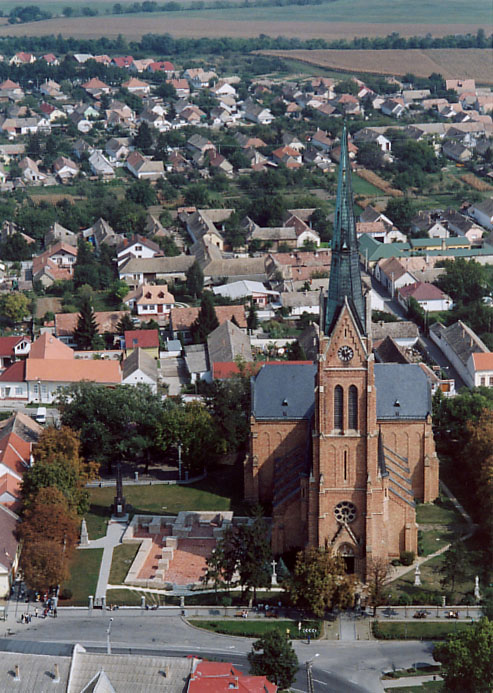

- Flag Coat of arms

- Location of Tolna county in Hungary

- Location of Bátaszék
- Coordinates: 46.19248°N 18.72258°E
- Country: Hungary
- County: Tolna

Area
  - Total: 63.54 km^{2} (24.53 sq mi)

Population (2015)
  - Total: 6,217
  - Density: 97.84/km^{2} (253.4/sq mi)
- Time zone: UTC+1 (CET)
  - Summer (DST): UTC+2 (CEST)
- Postal code: 7140
- Area code: 74

Bátaszék (German: Badeseck, Serbian: Батосек, romanized: Batosek) is a town in Tolna County, Hungary. The majority residents are Hungarians, with a significant minority of Germans.

"The oldest tree of Bátaszék" won the title of European Tree of the Year 2016.

The Roman Catholic writer Miklós Bátori was born in Bátaszék.

== History ==
The area around Bátaszék has long been the site of human habitation. In the Iron Age, the area was inhabited by Celts, who were eventually subdued by the Romans, and incorporated into the Roman province of Pannonia. To defend against attacks from barbarians, the Romans constructed fortifications called Pannonian Limes, which formed a continuously manned defensive line stretching from Óbuda to Osijek. The nearest Roman fortifications to Bátaszék were at Várdomb to the north, and Dunaszekcső to the south. Following the collapse of the Roman Empire, Bátaszék experienced waves of migration from various ethnic groups, including Sarmatians, Huns, Avars, Franks, Slavs, and eventually Magyars.

Following the Hungarian Conquest of the Carpathian Basin, Géza II of Hungary invited Cistercian monks to found a monastery in Bátaszék, and the surrounding 10 settlements constructed a joint church building adjoined to the monastery.

The town's brief flourishing under the Cistercians was quickly snuffed out by the First Mongol invasion of Hungary, and in March 1242 the Mongols set fire to the town, razing the church and monastery. The destruction was so total, the Cistercians were unable to rebuild the resettlement for over 100 years. Finally, funding from local landholders allowed for significant reconstruction, but the town never returned to its former glory, and the monastery could never be reconstructed. Eventually, Benedictines moved into the town, and built an abbey. In 1478, Matthias Corvinus united the abbey with the abbey of Báta, giving the town its current name of "Bátaszék".

The town's gradual redevelopment was eventually crushed by the invading Turks. Due to its resistance to Turkish conquest, Ottoman Grand Vizier Pargalı Ibrahim Pasha had the town razed to the ground in 1529. Following the Turkish occupation of Buda in 1541, Ottoman forces heavily fortified Bátaszék, constructing a hillfort. The local church was converted into a mosque in honour of Suleiman the Magnificent, and a minaret was added to its south-east corner.

After the Ottomans were defeated in Hungary, the region lay mostly uninhabited for a long period. In starting in 1718, Germans were encouraged to settle the region, and were offered three years tax-exemption as incentive to move in. These newly arrived Germans were industrious tinsmiths, wheelwrights, weavers, and cobblers, who developed the rural area into a bustling market economy.

During the Hungarian Revolution of 1848, almost 600 men (both Hungarian and German) volunteered as revolutionary soldiers. In 1849, when Transdanubia came under control of Habsburg imperial forces, a garrison was stationed in Bátaszék. In the mid-1860s, a fire wiped out the majority of the town, but reconstruction occurred rapidly. Between 1871 and 1873, the first railway ran through the town, eventually expanding to connect the town with Szekszárd, Pécs, and Baja.

In 1918, Bátaszék fell under the control of the Kingdom of Yugoslavia, and despite the fact that the Treaty of Trianon dictated that Bátaszék remain a part of Hungary, Yugoslav forces refused to leave the village for 33 months. During this time the town was under the control of the Serbian–Hungarian Baranya–Baja Republic, a short-lived Yugoslav puppet-state.

During Second World War, Bátaszék was captured on 28 November 1944 by Red Army troops of the 3rd Ukrainian Front in the course of the Budapest Offensive. Shortly after, the mass deportation of German-Hungarians began, and over 4000 German townsfolk were forced from their homes, and replaced with Hungarians from Transylvania and Slovakia.

== Sport ==
- Bátaszéki SE, association football club

== Demographics ==
As of the 2011 census, the town was 81.9% Hungarian, 7% German, 2% Gypsy, and 0.2% Romanian. The town was 48.3% Roman Catholic, and 7.3% Reformed.

== Twin towns — sister cities ==
Bátaszék is twinned with:

- Besigheim, Germany
- Ditrău, Romania
- Tekovské Lužany, Slovakia

== Gallery ==
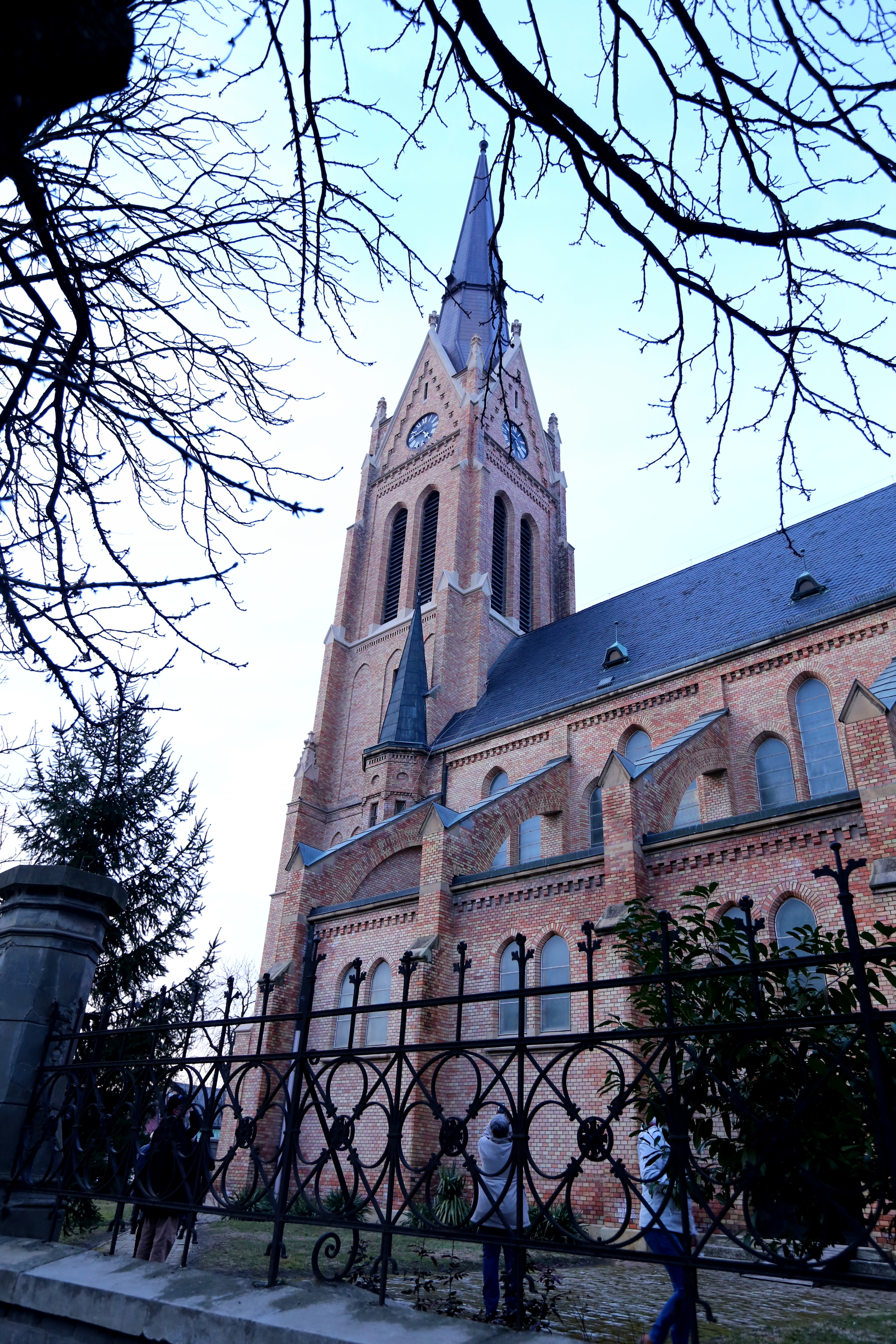
Roman Catholic Church in Bátaszék

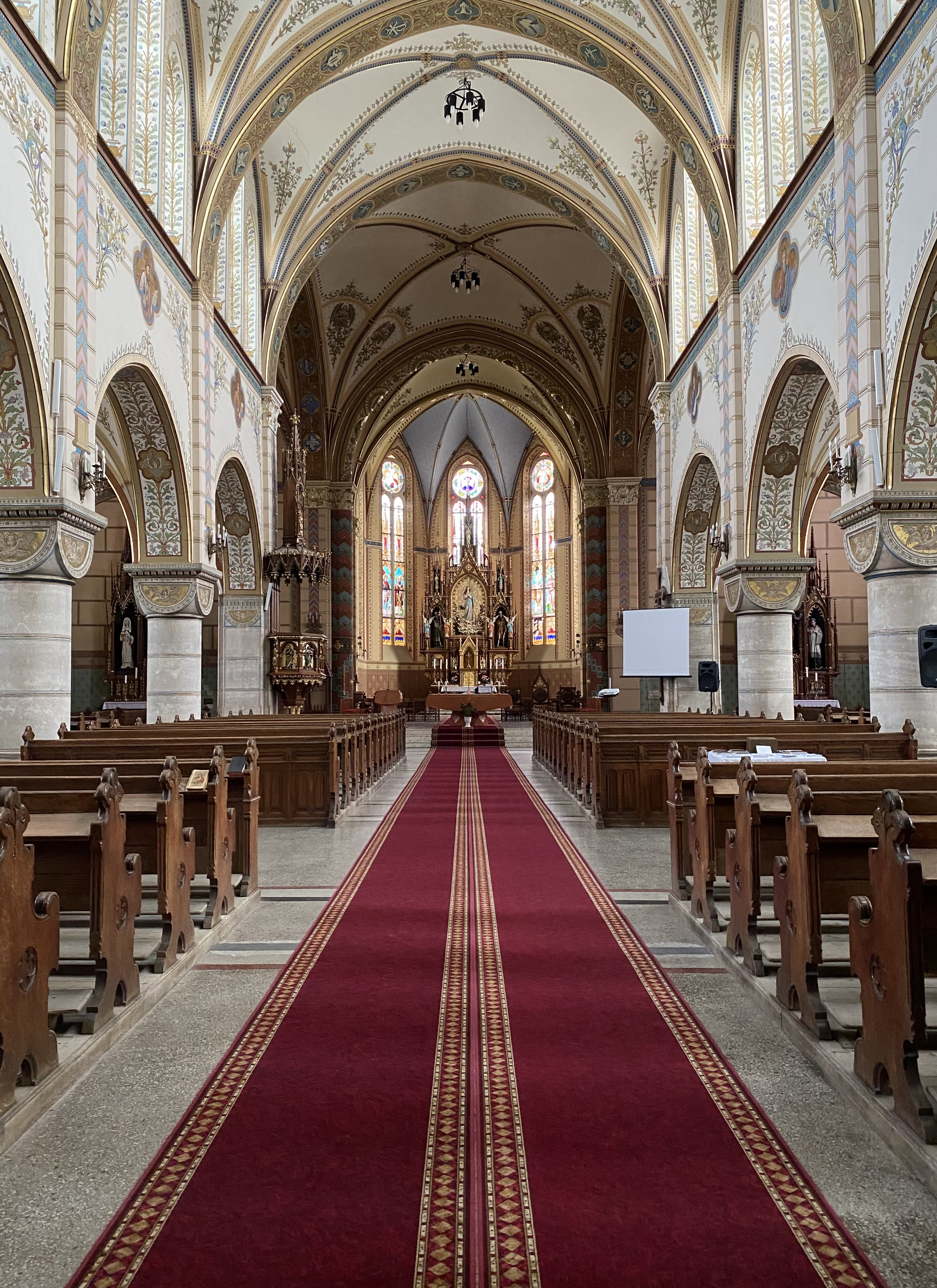
Interior of the Nagyboldogasszony Catholic Church

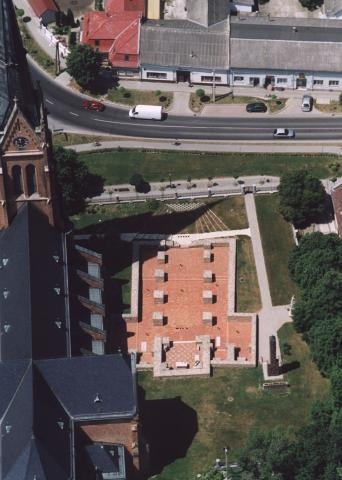
View at the site of the Cikádor Abbey

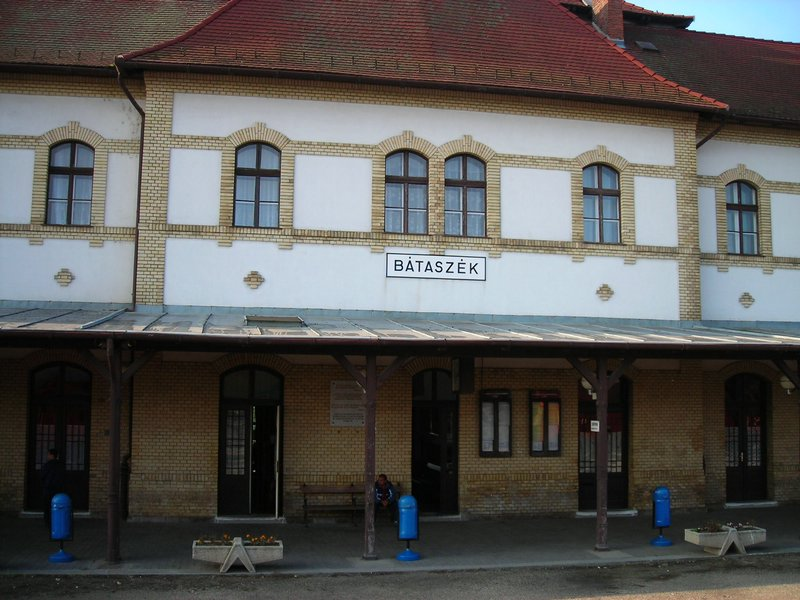
Bátaszék railway station

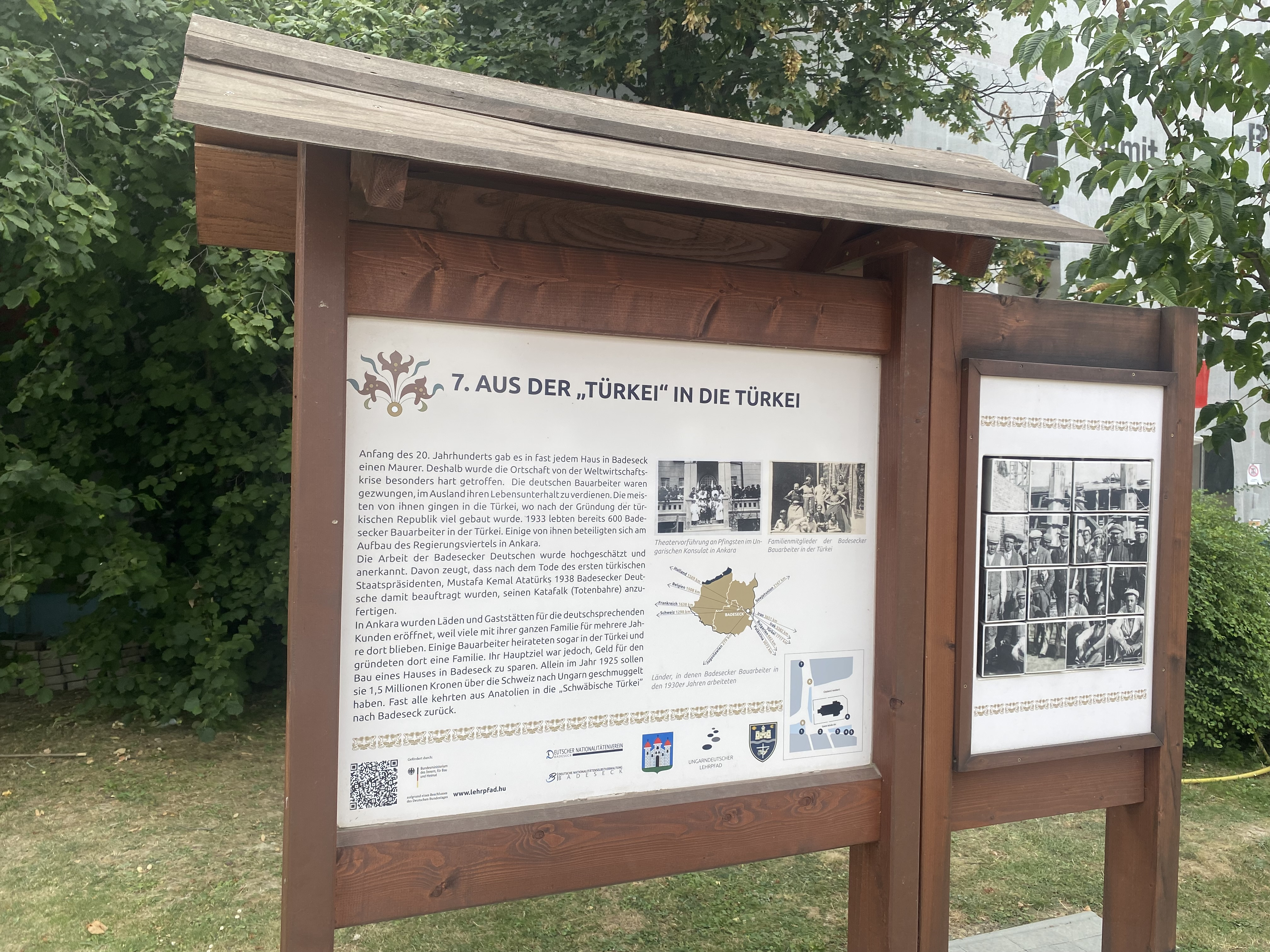
Information signs in German, reflective of the town's German roots and minority.

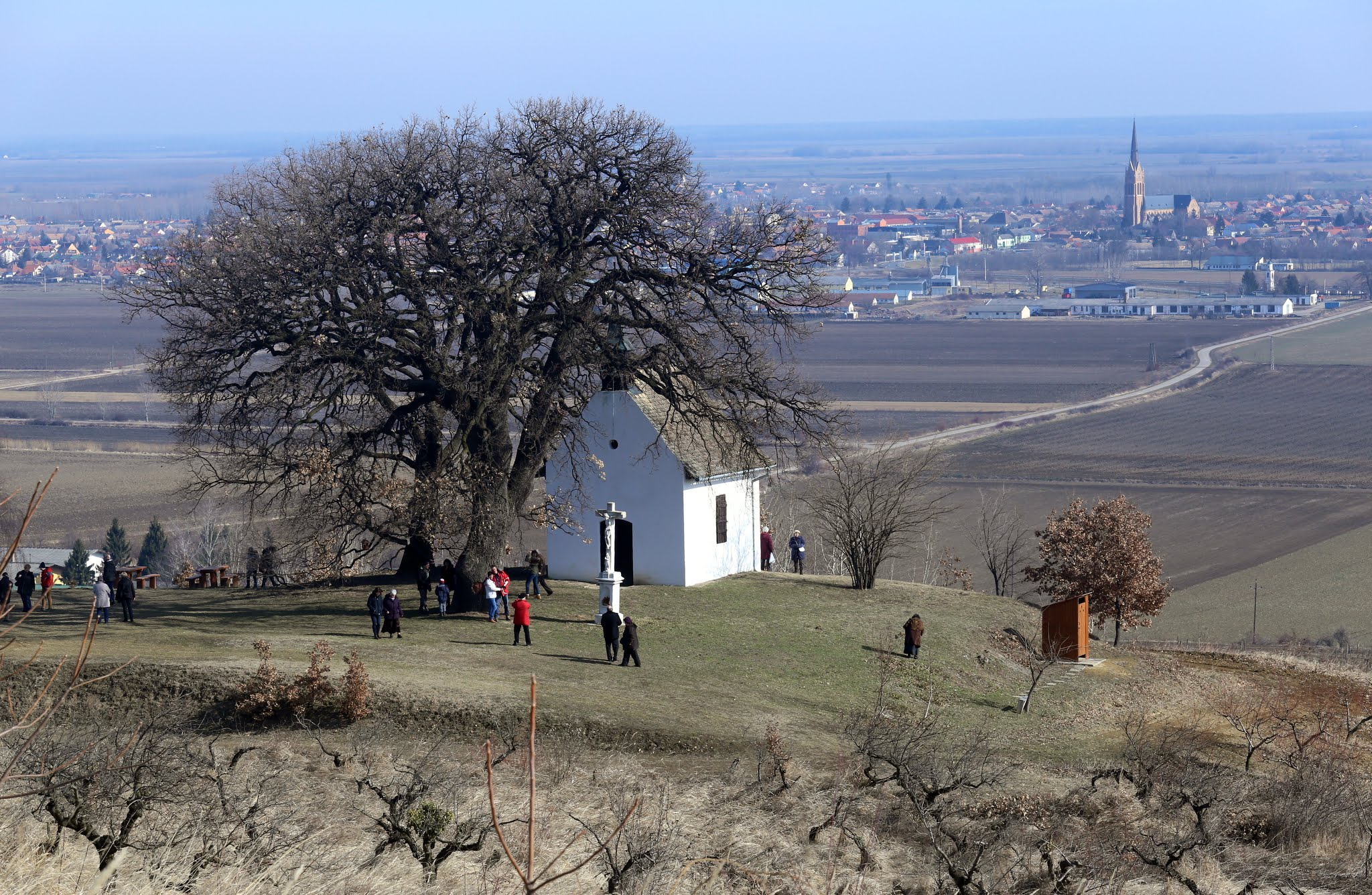
"The oldest tree of Bátaszék", European Tree of the Year 2016.
