= Denis Moreau =

French philosopher

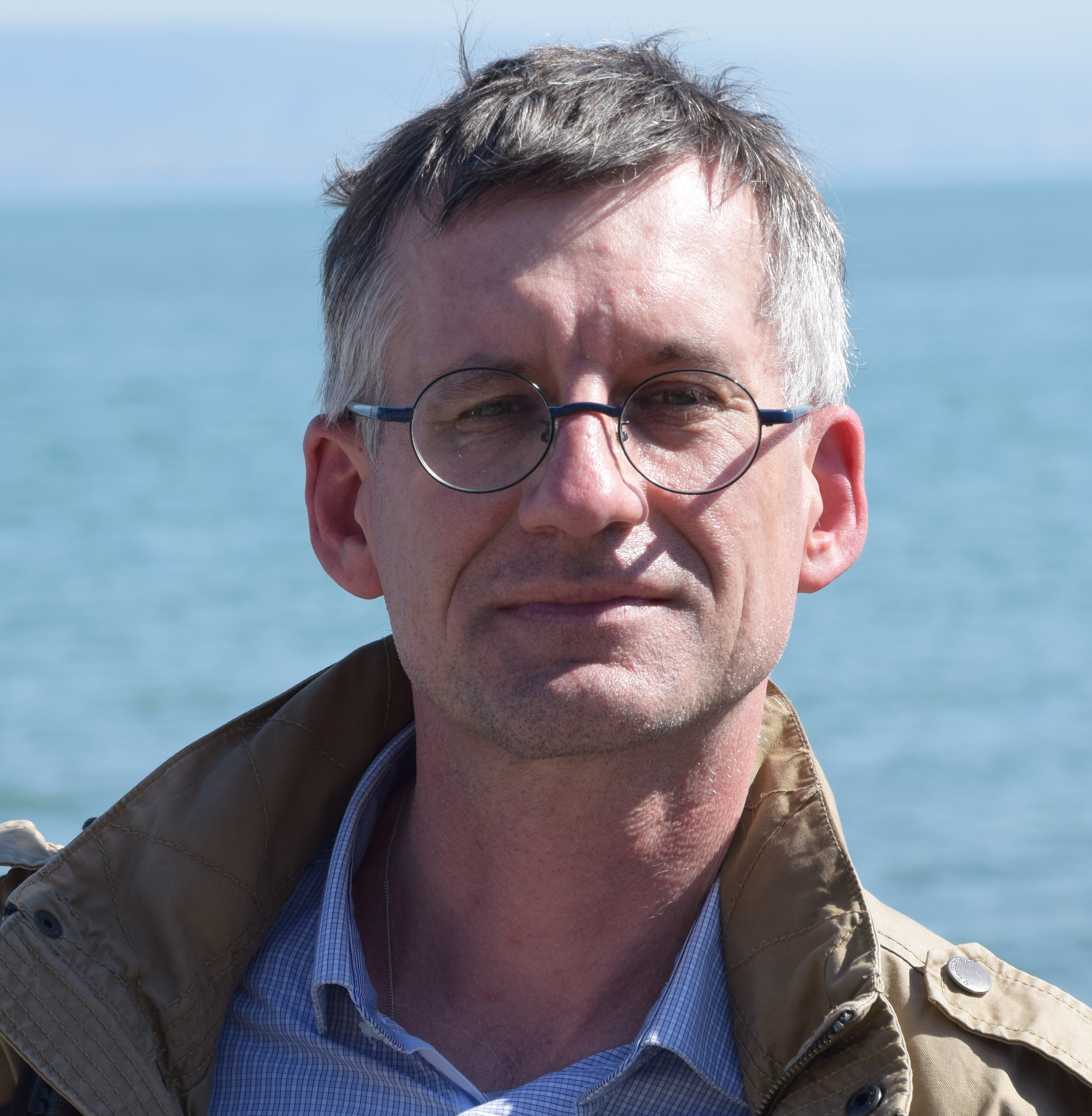
Denis Moreau

Denis Moreau (born 8 April 1967) is a French philosopher.

== Life ==
=== Studies ===
Born in Bordeaux, Moreau is a former student of the École normale supérieure de Paris (L1987) and member of the Institut universitaire de France. He taught at the Paris 12 Val de Marne University, then at the University of Nantes where he is currently professor of history of modern philosophy and philosophy of religion.

=== Career ===
His work focuses on two main fields: on the one hand, the history of 17th century philosophy, in particular Descartes and cartesianism, and on the other hand, the philosophy of religion, in particular christianity. He intends to follow the tradition of "Christian rationalism", specifying that he considers it necessary to count among the great representatives of this current thinkers such as Augustine of Hippo, Thomas Aquinas, Descartes, Malebranche, Spinoza, and Pope Benedict XVI. In his work on the philosophy of religion, he does not claim to propose a new understanding of Christianity, but tries to re-explain, with tools accessible to contemporary readers, central notions of Christianity that have become difficult to understand. He has devoted books to the theme of salvation (Les Voies du salut, Mort où est ta victoire?) another one to marriage (Pour la vie? Court Traité du mariage et des séparations)

A Rock'n roll fan, he tried, especially in a novel, Dans l’ombre d’Adam to bring together biblical texts and some currents of heavy metal music. He has defended, on several occasions, from his Catholic point of view, the French metal music festival "Hellfest"

He contributes to the journal La Vie. He directs the series "textes cartésiens en langue française" at editions Vrin and co-directs the series "Philosophica" at the Presses Universitaires de Rennes.

== Work ==
=== Books ===
- Deux cartésiens. La Polémique entre Antoine Arnauld et Nicolas Malebranche, Paris, Vrin, 1999, 354 p.
- Je pense donc je suis, Nantes, Pleins Feux, series "variations", 2004, 46 p.
- Malebranche, Paris, Vrin, series "bibliothèque des philosophies", 2004, 220 p.
- (dir. with P. Taranto): Activité physique et exercices spirituels. Essais de philosophie du sport, Paris, Vrin, 2008, 246 p.
- Foi en dieu et raison. Théodicées. Deux essais de philosophie de la religion, Nantes, Cécile Defaut, 2009, 224 p.
- Les Voies du salut. Un essai philosophique, Paris, Bayard, 2010, 418 p.
- Dans le milieu d’une forêt. Essai sur Descartes et le sens de la vie, Paris, Bayard, 2012.
- Dans l’ombre d’Adam, Paris, L’Œuvre, 2013.
- (dir. with C. Michon): Dictionnaire des monothéismes, Paris, Éditions du Seuil, 2013, 702 p.
- Pour la vie? Court traité du mariage et des séparations (special mention of the Grand prix catholique de littérature 2015), Paris, Seuil, 2014; reprint Paris, Seuil, cseries "Points Sagesses", 2018
- La Philosophie de Descartes, Paris, Vrin, 2016, 204 p.
- Mort, où est ta victoire ? (Les Voies du salut, II), Paris, Bayard, 2017, 376 p.
- Comment peut-on être catholique?. Scien Hum (H.C) (in French). Le Seuil. 2018. ISBN 978-2021336610.
- Y a-t-il une philosophie chrétienne? Trois essais, Paris, Seuil, series "Points Sagesses", 2019, 208 p.

=== Editions and translations ===
- Editing, introduction and annotation of the Lettre-préface of the Principes de la philosophie de Descartes, with a choice of texts, Paris, Garnier-Flammarion, 1996
- Latin translation, introduction and annotation of Book IV of the Summa contra Gentiles by Thomas d'Aquin, Paris, Garnier-Flammarion, 1999, 2005-2
- Editing, introduction and annotation of the Discours de la méthode de Descartes, with a choice of texts and a file, Paris, Le Livre de Poche, 2000
- Editing and translation from Latin of Textes philosophiques d'Antoine Arnauld, Paris, PUF, series Epiméthée, 2001 (edition from unpublished manuscripts; foreword, introductions, notes; bibliographie arnaldienne)
- (in collaboration with E. Kremer) Introduction and selection of texts for the reprinting of part of the Works of Antoine Arnauld at Thoemmes Presses, Bristol, 6 volumes, 2003
- Translation from Latin of Part One and a selection of articles from the parts II, III and IV of the Principes de la philosophie de Descartes, Paris, Vrin, 2009.
- Editing, introduction and annotation of the Vraies et fausses idées by Antoine Arnauld, Paris, Vrin, 2011
- (with M. Michaud-Leroux) Introduction and publishing of the Entretiens sur la métaphysique et sur la religion by Nicolas Malebranche, Paris, Vrin, 2017
