= Christian Chabanis =

French writer, philosopher and journalist

- Born: 9 August 1936; Bourg-Saint-Andéol (Ardèche)
- Died: 25 April 1989 (aged 52); Paris
- Occupations: Writer; Philosopher; Journalist

Christian Chabanis (9 August 1936 – 25 April 1989) was a French writer, philosopher and journalist.

== Biography ==
A journalist, essayist and novelist, he was also the author of numerous books on fundamental reflections and surveys on the place of faith and the Catholic Church in the modern world and also on death and childhood. He was awarded the Grand prix catholique de littérature in 1985. He created the series "Verse et controverse" at éditions Beauchesne.

He rests in the cemetery of Théoule-sur-Mer.

== Bibliography ==
=== Works ===
- 1964: Jeanne de Flandreysy ou la passion de la gloire
- 1967: Les jeunes d'aujourd'hui : découverte de soi-enseignement, Jean Camp, Christian Chabanis, Éditions du Centurion
- 1967: Gustave Thibon témoin de la lumière, Éditions Beauchesne
- 1975: Entretiens, Gustave Thibon, éditions Fayard
- 1977: Bâtisseur de cathédrales, éditions S.O.S.
- 1979: Dieu existe ? Oui, interviews with Jacques Delors, Françoise Dolto, Robert Hossein, Joseph Fontanet, François Ceyrac, Stock
- 1981: Jean-Paul I, illustrated by Jacques Poirier, édition le Sarment
- 1982: Jean Salusse, édition de la Caisse nationale des monuments historiques et des sites
- 1982: La mort, un terme ou un commencement, interviews with Philippe Ariès, Emmanuel Lévinas, Emmanuel Le Roy Ladurie, Jérôme Lejeune, Francis Jeanson, Jean-Marie Lustiger, Luis Miguel Dominguín, Marcel Bigeard, Ariane Mnouchkine, Jean Dausset, etc., édition Fayard
- 1982: Dieu existe ? Non, interviews with Raymond Aron, Jacques Duclos, Roger Garaudy, Pierre Debray-Ritzen, Alfred Grosser, Daniel Guérin, Eugène Ionesco, François Jacob, Alfred Kastler, Claude Lévi-Strauss, Isabelle Meslin, Edgar Morin, Henri Petit, Jean Rostand and Jean Vilar, Stock
- 1984: Il était une fois l'enfant, Fayard
- 1985: À ceux qui ne croient plus en rien, ni en personne, Fayard
- 1987: Au nom du pauvre, éditions S.O.S
- 1991: Obsession de Dieu : les chemins de ma vie, Éditions Desclée de Brouwer

=== Forewords and articles ===
- « Joseph Delteil au cœur du monde », in France Catholique, Christian Chabanis, Le Figaro Littéraire, 30 December 1961.
- « Poésies françaises du félibre Marius André », foreword by Christian Chabanis, publisher Napoli, 1963
- « Montherlant encombré de Dieu ? », Christian Chabanis, Les Nouvelles littéraires, 23 January 1964
- « Malraux et la crise de notre temps », La France catholique, 13 November 1970
- « Jean Vilar et l'espérance blessée », La France Catholique, 11 June 1971
- « L'essai est-il un genre ? », Les Nouvelles littéraires 7 January 1973
- « Colette aujourd'hui », Les Nouvelles littéraires 29 January 1973
- « Barrault, le héraut de Zarathoustra », La France catholique, 7 February 1975
- « Le charme discret des gares provinciales », Caisse nationale des monuments historiques n°6, 1978
- « Comme l'or purifié par le feu », Edith Stein (1891–1942), Elisabeth Miribel, foreword by Christian Chabanis, Éditions Plon, Paris, February 1984
- « Révolution artistique et création artistique », Éditions de la Table ronde, n°. 251-2, December 1968
- « Les Juifs », dialogue between Jean Daniélou and André Chouraqui, dialogues directed by Jean-Marie Aubert and Christian Chabanis, series Verse et controverse, cahier 1, éditions Beauchesne, 1966
- « Chrétien de droite ou de gauche », dialogue between Jean de Fabrègues and Jacques Madaule, dialogues directed by Jean-Marie Aubert and Christian Chabanis, Collection Verse et controverse, Cahier 2, éditions Beauchesne, 1966
- « Les Jeunes d'aujourd'hui : Découverte de soi, enseignement, culture, création, mort, révolte », Christian Chabanis et Jean Camp, 1967
- « Le village accroché, reflets de Bigorre », nouvelles de DABADIE Maïté, foreword by Christian Chabanis, 1976
- « Du Cantal au Kiang Si - La mère de chez nous » de Gauthier Jacques-Prosper, foreword by Christian Chabanis, 1984
