= Fabrice Hadjadj =

French essayist and philosopher (born 1971)

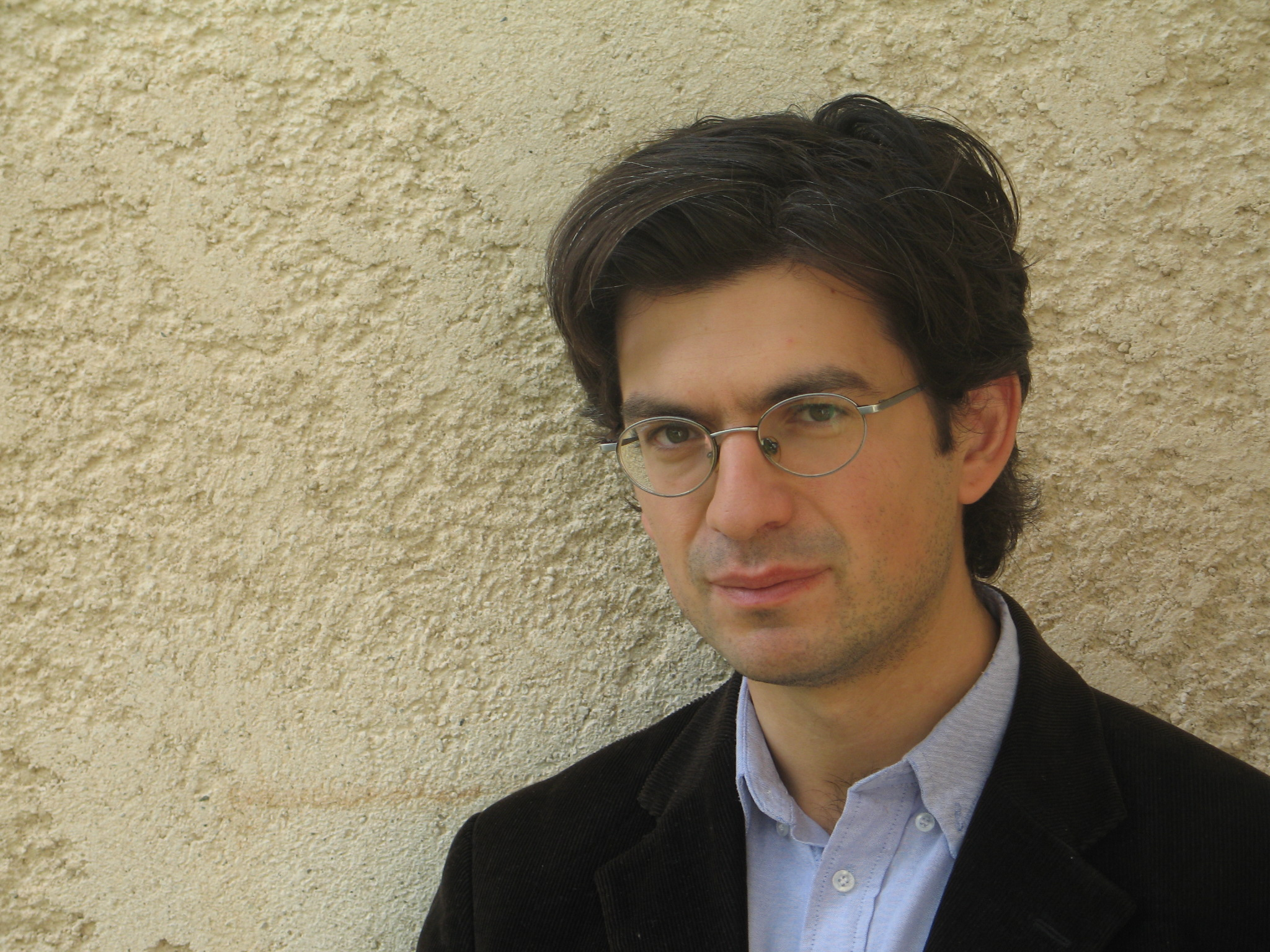
Fabrice Hadjadj

Fabrice Hadjadj (born 1971) is a French philosopher. Hadjadj was born in Nanterre to Jewish parents of Tunisian heritage. In his teens he was an atheist and anarchist, and he maintained a nihilistic attitude for most of his twenties until, in 1998, he converted to Catholicism.

His book Réussir sa mort: Anti-méthode pour vivre, won the Grand prix catholique de littérature in 2006. Currently Hadjadj teaches philosophy and literature in Toulon. He is married to the actress Siffreine Michel. They have ten children. In 2014, Hadjadj was nominated as member of the Pontifical Council for the Laity.

== Publications ==
- Traité de Bouddhisme zen à l'usage du bourgeois d'Occident (under the pseudonym Tetsuo-Marcel Kato), Éditions du PARC, 1998
- Et les violents s'en emparent, Éditions Les Provinciales, 1999
- A quoi sert de gagner le monde: Une vie de saint François Xavier, Éditions Les Provinciales, 2002; revised edition 2004 (Play)
- La terre chemin du ciel, Éditions du Cerf, 2002
- La salle capitulaire (with Gérard Breuil), Éditions Les Provinciales, 2003 (Monologues to accompany an exhibition by Breuil)
- Arcabas: Passion Résurrection, Éditions du Cerf, 2004 (Theatrical work to accompany a polyptych by Arcabas)
- Réussir sa mort: Anti-méthode pour vivre, Presses de la Renaissance, 2005 (Grand Prix catholique de littérature)
- Massacre des Innocents: Scènes de ménage et de tragédie, Éditions Les Provinciales, 2006 (Play)
- La profondeur des sexes: Pour une mystique de la chair, Éditions du Seuil, 2008
- L'agneu mystique: Le retable des frères Van Eyck, Éditions de l'Oeuvre, 2008
- Pasiphaé: ou comment l'on devient la mère du Minotaure, Éditions Desclée de Brouer, 2009 (Play)
- La foi des dėmons: ou l'athéisme dépassé, Éditions Salvator, 2009
- Le jugement dernier: Le retable de Beaune, Éditions de l'Oeuvre, 2010
- Le Paradis à la porte: Essai sur une joie qui dérange, Éditions du Seuil, 2011
- Job: ou la torture des amis, Éditions Salvator, 2011
- Comment parler de Dieu aujourd'hui: Anti-manuel d'évangélisation, Éditions Salvator, 2012
- Résurrection, Mode d'emploi, Magnificat, 2015 (French edition)
- The Resurrection: Experience Life in the Risen Christ, Magnificat, 2015 (English edition)
- Dernières nouvelles de l'homme (et de la femme aussi), Éditions Tallandier, 2017, ISBN 9791021029835
