= Jean Sévillia =

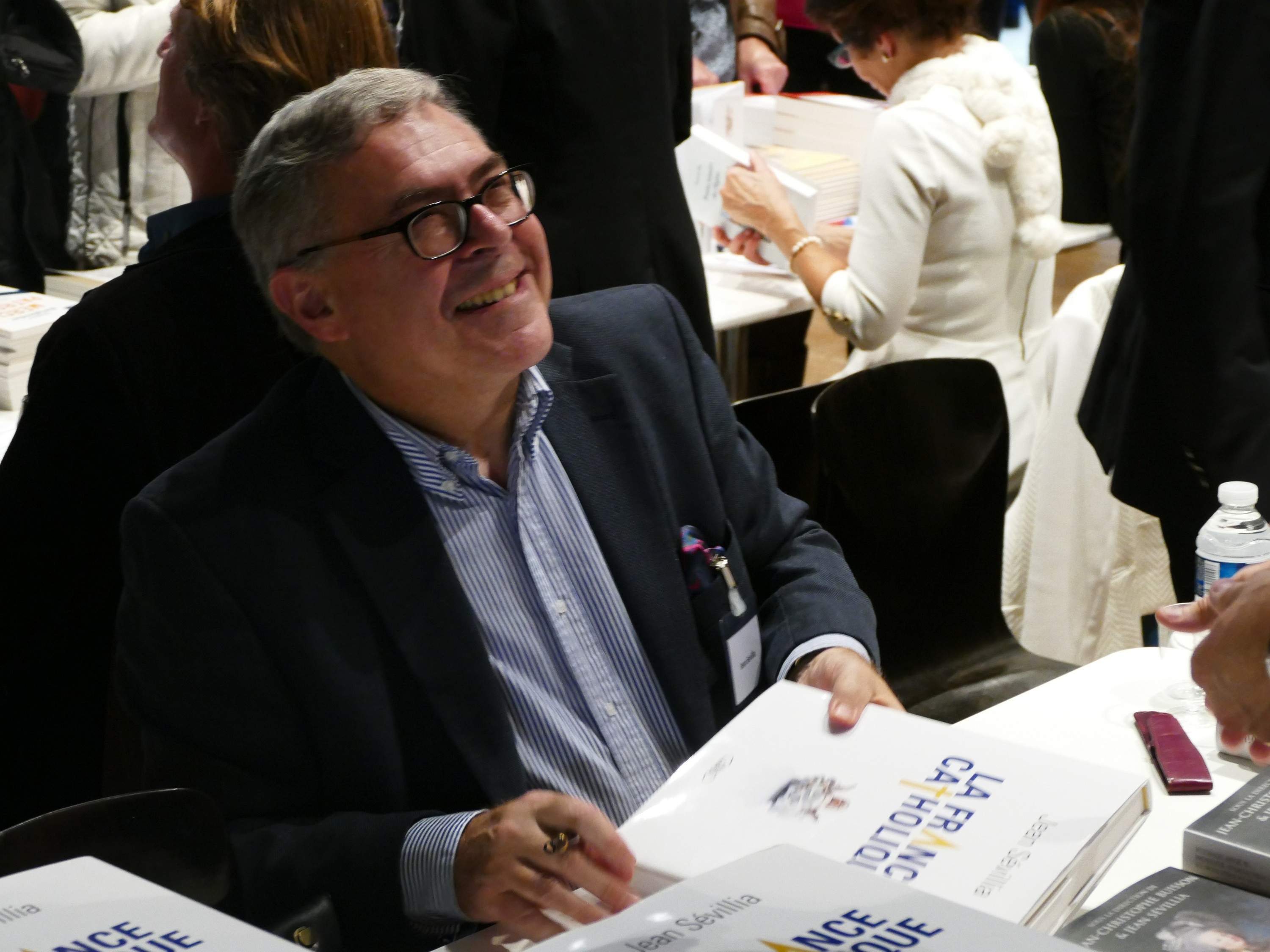
- Jean Sévillia in 2015
- Born: September 14, 1952; Paris, France
- Occupation(s): Journalist, essayist

Jean Sévillia (born in Paris on September 14, 1952) is a conservative French journalist and essayist. He is known for writings in Le Figaro Magazine. His defense of the Roman Catholic Church's role in history has made him popular from traditionalist and conservative organisations in France. He is critical of what he perceives to be left wing bias in the media that often influence popular beliefs on history.
