= Renée Massip =

French writer and journalist

Renée Massip (31 March 1907 - 21 March 2002) was a French writer and journalist. She was the winner of the 1963 Prix Interallié and member of the jury of the Prix Femina.

== Early life and education ==
Massip (née Renée Castaing) was born in south-western France, in the Pyrénées-Atlantiques department. Her parents were school principals. Her home town was Arette. She attended the École Normale in Pau, studying history and literature.

== Career ==
Massip married the French journalist Roger Massip, and from 1931 to 1937, followed her husband who was then a French newspaper correspondent in Romania and Poland. In 1939, she became a journalist, and joined the desk of Havas, a French news and advertising agency. She lived in Lyon during World War II.

Massip worked for the French newspapers France-Soir and the literary section of Le Figaro. She was a permanent member of the French literary prize Prix Femina committee from 1972 to 1996.

Massip has written a dozen books, including Douce Lumiere, La Regente, and La Vie Absente. In 1963 she published La Bête quaternaire, for which she received the Prix Interallié, and Le Rire de Sara for which she won the Grand Prize of the Catholic Novel in 1966.

== Books ==
- 1945: L'Odyssée comporte un retour
- 1954: La Régente
- 1956: La Petite Anglaise
- 1958: Les Déesses
- 1963 La Bête quaternaire - prix Interallié
- 1961: 'La Main paternelle
- 1966: Le Rire de Sara - Grand prix catholique de littérature 1967
- 1967: L'Aventure du lièvre blanc
- 1969: Les Torts réciproques
- 1970: L'Entente du couple
- 1971: À la santé de Dieu
- 1973: La Vie absente
- 1974: La Femme et l'Amitié
- 1976: Qu'avez-vous fait de lui
- 1977: Le Chat de Briarres
- 1979: Belle à jamais.
- 1981: Les Passants du siècle
