= Gustave Thibon =

French philosopher (1903–2001)

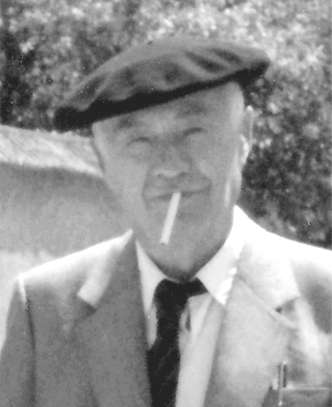
- Thibon in 1982
- Born: 2 September 1903; Saint-Marcel d'Ardèche, France
- Died: 19 January 2001 (aged 97); Saint-Marcel d'Ardèche, France

Philosophical work
- Era: Modern philosophy: 20th-century philosophy
- Region: Western philosophy: French philosophy
- School: Christian philosophy
- Language: French, Provençal, Latin

Signature
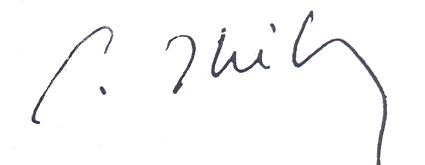

Gustave Thibon (French: [tibɔ̃]; 2 September 1903 – 19 January 2001) was a French philosopher. He was nominated for the Nobel Prize in Literature five times by Édouard Delebecque, in 1963, 1964, 1965, 1966 and 1968.

== Biography ==
Although essentially self-taught (he left school at the age of thirteen), Thibon was an avid reader – especially of poetry, in French, Provençal and Latin. He was very impressed by the First World War, which led him to hate patriotism and democracy. The young Gustave Thibon travelled extensively, at first to London and Italy, and later to North Africa, where he served in the military, before returning to his native village at the age of 23. Under the influence of writers such as Léon Bloy and Jacques Maritain, he converted to Catholicism. At the invitation of the latter, he started his literary career in the pages of the Revue Thomiste.

During World War II Thibon hosted the philosopher Simone Weil at his farm. When Weil left France for the United States she left Thibon her notebooks, which he published in edited form as La Pesanteur et la Grâce (Gravity and Grace) in 1947. During the war, Thibon was supportive of Philippe Pétain and Charles Maurras, though he was never a formal member of Action Française.

== Works ==
- 1933 – À Propos de Trois Récents Ouvrages de Maritain.
- 1934 – La Science du Caractère.
- 1940 – Poèmes.
- 1941 – Destin de l'Homme.
- 1942 – L'Échelle de Jacob.
- 1942 – Diagnostics. Essai de Physiologie Sociale.
- 1943 – Retour au Réel.
- 1945 – Le Pain de Chaque Jour.
- 1946 – Offrande du Soir.
- 1947 – "Une Métaphysique de la Communion: l'Existentialisme de Gabriel Marcel."
- 1947 – Ce que Dieu a Uni.
- 1948 – Chateaubriand.
- 1948 – Nietzsche ou le Déclin de l'Esprit.
- 1949 – Paysages du Vivarais.
- 1953 – La Crise Moderne de l'Amour.
- 1959 – Vous Serez Comme des Dieux.
- 1974 – L'Ignorance Étoilée.
- 1975 – Notre Regard qui Manque à la Lumière.
- 1975 – Entretiens avec Christian Chabanis.
- 1976 – L'Équilibre et l'Harmonie.
- 1985 – Le Voile et le Masque.
- 1988 – Entretiens avec G. Thibon.
- 1993 – Au Soir de ma Vie.
- 1995 – L'Illusion Féconde.
- 2006 – Aux Ailes de la Lettre.
- 2011 – Parodies et Mirages ou la Décadence d'un Monde Chrétien: Notes Inédites (1935–1978).
- 2012 – Les Hommes de l’éternel, conférences au grand public (1940-1985).
- 2022 – Au secours des évidences : billets.
- 2023 – Propos d'avant-hier pour après-demain.
