= Philippe Sellier =

French literary critic and scholar (1931–2024)

- Born: Philippe Pierre Jules Sellier; 8 November 1931; France
- Died: 3 April 2024 (aged 92); France
- Occupation: Literary critic
- Known for: Professor at Paris-Sorbonne University

Philippe Sellier (8 November 1931 – 3 April 2024) was a French literary critic and scholar. He was a specialist in the great writers who revolved around Port-Royal-des-Champs: Pascal, Racine, Antoine Arnauld, Louis-Isaac Lemaistre de Sacy, La Rochefoucauld, Mme de Sévigné, Mme de Lafayette. Sellier was born on 8 November 1931, and died on 3 April 2024, at the age of 92.

== Main works ==
- Port-Royal et la littérature, Paris, Champion publishing house, 2 vol. (1999 and 2000).
- Essais sur l’imaginaire classique, Paris, Champion, 2003.
- Pascal : colorations oratoriennes, in Pascal auteur spirituel, Paris, Champion, 2006.
- Corresponsibility of Dissidents, excentriques et marginaux de l’âge classique. Autour de Cyrano de Bergerac, Mélanges M. Alcover, Paris, Champion, 2006.
- Pascal et la liturgie, Paris, PUF, 1966.
- Pascal et saint Augustin, Paris, Éditions Albin Michel, 1995.
- L'évasion, Paris, Bordas, 1971.
- Le mythe du héros ou le désir d'être Dieu, Paris, Bordas, 1970.
- Édition du Port-Royal by Sainte-Beuve, Paris, Éditions Robert Laffont, “Bouquins”, 2 vol., 2004.
- Édition de Pascal, Paris, Mercure de France, 1976
- Édition de Pascal, Provinciales, Pensées et opuscules divers, in collaboration with G. Ferreyrolles, Paris, La Pochothèque, 2004.
- Corresponsibility of Poétique de la pensée. Mélanges J. Dagen, Paris, Champion, 2007.
- La Bible expliquée à ceux qui ne l'ont pas encore lue, Paris, Éditions du Seuil, 2007.
- Pascal, textes choisis, Paris, Seuil, 2009, Collection "Bibliothèque".
- La Bible. Aux sources de la culture occidentale, Paris, Seuil, Point/Sagesse, 2013.

== Prize ==
- Prix Pierre-Georges-Castex 2007.
