= NRC's Best Dutch novels =

Survey conducted by a Dutch newspaper

NRC's Best Dutch novels is a list of the most popular Dutch-language novels as of 2007.

This list is based on an internet survey on books, carried out by the Dutch newspaper NRC Handelsblad in the beginning of 2007. The Dutch public originally voted for their best-loved books from a "long-list". The long-list also contained Flemish authors like Louis Paul Boon, Hugo Claus and Willem Elsschot. From this, a "short-list" of ten books was drawn up for further voting. In March 2007 the final voting as shown below was presented on the Dutch national television.

The list comprises nine novels. The works by Nescio are three novellas which have been published together. The list no longer contains Flemish (Belgian) authors.

== The 10 books ==
1. Harry Mulisch, The Discovery of Heaven; (1992)
2. Kader Abdolah, The House of the Mosque; (2005)
3. Multatuli, Max Havelaar; (1860)
4. J. Bernlef, Out of mind; (1984)
5. Willem Frederik Hermans, The Darkroom of Damocles; (1958)
6. Willem Frederik Hermans, Beyond Sleep; (1966)
7. J. J. Voskuil, Het Bureau; (series; 1996 - 2000)
8. Nescio, The Mooch, Young Bucks, Dichtertje; (three novellas; 1911-1918)
9. Gerard Reve, De avonden (The evenings); (1947)
10. Thomas Rosenboom, Publieke werken; (1999)

== See also ==
- Dutch literary canon
