= Beyond Sleep =

1966 novel by Willem Frederik Hermans

- First edition
- Author: Willem Frederik Hermans
- Original title: Nooit meer slapen
- Translator: Ina Rilke
- Language: Dutch
- Set in: Norway, c. 1961
- Publisher: De Bezige Bij
- Publication date: 1966
- Publication place: Netherlands
- English publication date: 2006
- Pages: 249
- OCLC: 891839183
- Dewey Decimal: 839.31364
- LC Class: PT5844 .H526

Beyond Sleep (Dutch: Nooit meer slapen, "Nevermore to Sleep") is a novel by the Dutch writer Willem Frederik Hermans, published in February 1966. The protagonist, Dutch geologist Alfred Issendorf, has a geology dissertation in preparation, and embarks on an expedition to Finnmark, northern Norway, to verify his dissertation director's theory that craters in the local landscape were formed by meteor impacts rather than by Ice Age glaciers. Initially he is accompanied by a group of three Norwegian students of geology, but soon after he is isolated from his companions wandering on his own in a land where the sun never sets.

Beyond Sleep is one of the canonical novels of the Dutch postwar period, and a prime example of what is perhaps the most distinctive characteristic of the author's work, the intense cohesion between theme and narrative strategy.

== Plot ==
Alfred Issendorf, a geology student from Amsterdam, has received a grant to do field work in Finnmark, Norway, attempting to verify his professor's theory that meteors have impacted the area, leaving telltale craters. His professor, Sibbelee, has written the Norwegian professor Nummedal (his own former dissertation director) to ask for aerial photographs of the area, but when Issendorf meets Nummedal in Oslo the latter knows nothing of any photographs (and scoffs at the meteor theory); if they exist, he says, they may be at the Geological Survey in Trondheim, with a Professor Hvalbiff. In Trondheim, however, no Hvalbiff is present, and the unfinished office buildings are in disarray—quickly it turns out that no aerial photographs are here, and later Issendorf discovers that Hvalbiff ("whale meat") was probably a derogatory name for the director, Oftedahl.

Without photographs, and now sleep-deprived because of his anxieties and the lack of darkness at night, Issendorf travels on to Tromsø, and thence to Alta, in Finnmark. There, he meets up with Arne, an old geology acquaintance who is also there for fieldwork, and then with two more students, Qvigstad and Mikkelsen. With two tents, tinned meat, and boxes of knekkebrød, the four set out for the interior, a rather bleak, uninhabited, and mosquito-infested area. One of their camps is under the mountain Vuorje, at a lake where they fish for trout. Issendorf, who does not get along with Qvigstad and Mikkelsen, sleeps poorly and spends much of his time in gloomy thoughts, feeling unable to measure up to his father and even to Arne, and wondering whether ancient resentment between Sibbelee, Oftedahl, and Nummedal is to blame for making his mission impossible.

Issendorf's efforts at locating meteor impact craters are eminently unsuccessful. One morning he finds Qvigstad and Mikkelsen gone, and he continues to another location with Arne. After crossing a deep ravine, he differs with Arne on what direction to take and charges on without waiting for him, but soon discovers he had misread his beautiful new compass, which he promptly loses. By orienting himself toward Vuorje he is able to backtrack to the ravine, a journey of several days; as it turns out, Arne had set up camp there to wait for him, but then fallen to his death.

== Characters ==
- Alfred Issendorf, Dutch Ph.D. candidate in geology.
- Arne Jordahl, Norwegian geologist, Alfred's guide.
- Qvigstadt, Norwegian geologist, joins the two before he leaves together with Mikkelsen.
- Mikkelsen, Norwegian geologist, in possession of aerial photographs, principal companion of Qvigstadt.

Minor characters.

- Ørnulf Nummedal, Norwegian professor of geology at Oslo, very old and almost blind, unable to help Alfred access aerial photographs.
- Oftedahl, Norwegian professor of geology at Trondheim, unable or unwilling to hand aerial photographs to Alfred.

== Themes ==
According to Hermans scholar Frans A. Janssen, the novel can be read at three levels: as the report of a geological expedition, as a psychological story of a young man with the urge to supersede his father's achievement, and as a philosophical story in which the search for meteorites must be interpreted as a "holy grail quest", one that leads the protagonist to the insight that no understanding of the fundamental mystery of life is possible. With regard to the last level, Janssen speaks of an "inverted Bildungsroman".

Hermans scholar G.F.H. Raat relates the narrative technique to the theory of the three stages in the history of mankind, described some thirty pages into the book. In the first stage, man does not know his mirror image. At this point, he is fully subjective and has no self-image. Inaugurating the second stage is Narcissus's discovery of the mirror image. Now there exists an I registering a self, and these are symmetrical. The third stage begins with the invention of photography, and this hands out the final blow of the truth, for a picture is an objective fixation of the image the outside world holds of a person. The image that man loves (his self-image or ideal image) and the circulating photographs of him (the different images of him that the outside world develops) are at odds with each other. The problematic nature of this third stage is a theme in many of the author's novels and stories, and essentially it is the problem of Osewoudt of the war novel The Darkroom of Damocles (1958), driven to despair by the discrepancies between his own view of himself and the images that others have of him. Unable to find acceptance for his view of himself, he loses his identity as well as his life.

Similarly, Alfred fights for his identity as he attempts to become symmetrical to his ideal self-image and to find confirmation for this image from others. The implication is that he finds himself in the third stage, yet his view of himself is far from complete, which becomes evident when he looks in the little mirror in his compass. The image that is supposed to lead him on his way is incomplete, because the mirror is so small that even when held at arm's length it cannot project his full face. Only after his separation from Arne does he become symmetrical to his mirror image, as borne out by his own description of his baffled face in the mirror when he discovers he must have read the compass wrong. At this point, with his mouth open in shock, his face is perfectly in tune with how he feels. Here, says Raat, I and self are one. Apparently he has entered the second stage, because not long before this episode he discovered that his camera, which symbolizes the third stage, was no longer working.

This regression goes even further when Alfred's compass, and the mirror in it, disappears in a crack in a rock of stone. Alfred now enters the subjectivity characteristic of the first stage, also indicated by his use of his native language for the first time in weeks. Appropriately, he has to live in primitive circumstances until he reaches inhabited territory again. Surviving like the first prehistoric people, he ponders and worries less than before and finds himself in harmony with nature for the first time.

Eventually, as the circular structure of the novel suggests, Alfred will make it back to his point of departure. The discovery of Arne's dead body brings Alfred to a state of confusion in which he climbs and descends the very mountain ridge that caused Arne's fatal fall. Earlier in the novel, Alfred was looking up to Arne's easy, self-confident way of handling such obstacles in the terrain. Now Alfred is his equal. An ominous side to this identification is that Alfred will offer to Professor Nummedal to finish Arne's project, and by doing so he puts himself again in the position of a dependent.

== Style ==
The writing style, with short phrases and paragraphs full of catchy oneliners, gives the impression of someone jotting down notes. The only correction to the inherently unreliable first-person point of view and prejudiced, limited perception of Alfred Issendorf lies in Arne's diary. In the difficult circumstances of the expedition, the narrator's focus is continuously on himself. During his quest for what he is and can be, he inspects himself almost without interruption. As the narrator recognizes, his geological research in fact comes down to soul-searching. According to scholar G.F.H Raat, this habit of incessant self-observing resembles looking in the mirror, and this fundamental disposition of Alfred finds its equivalent in the use of first-person present-tense narration. To narrate the events simultaneously with their unfolding, with a narrator focused on his own position, is remarkably analogous to the situation of someone who watches his own mirror image.

== Background ==
Two geographical expeditions, in 1960 to Sweden and in 1961 to Norway, undertaken by the author serve as the basis for the book. The 1960 visit entailed attending a geographical congress on glacial morphology. Hermans started writing the book in 1962, during a period where he wrote exclusively first-person narratives, mostly in the present tense. This narrative technique intrigued him throughout the decade: his only other work of fiction from this decade is the 1967 short story-collection A Miracle Child or a Total Loss (Een wonderkind of een total loss), which consists of four first-person narratives, three of them in the present tense.

== Publication history ==
The first edition was published in February 1966 by publisher De Bezige Bij in 19,400 paperback copies and 490 hardbound copies. Revisions were introduced as soon as the second printing, issued in the same year. From the sixth printing (1969) on, the cover illustration was a photograph by the author himself of a big rock in an otherwise empty landscape, with a backpacker far in the background. Major revisions were introduced in the eleventh printing (1973), and the fifteenth printing (1979) introduced more than 250 revisions, in addition to another new cover photograph, again by the author, this time of a stream of water with stones and little rocks in it. Hereafter no more revisions were introduced. During the author's life the number of printings totalled twenty-five.

== Reception ==
Some of the first reviewers criticized the construction of the novel, taking the death of Arne as its climax and considering the subsequent pages superfluous. Within a few years the book was widely accepted as a masterpiece. In 1967 the Jan Campert Foundation (Jan Campertstichting) awarded the author the Vijverberg Prize of 2,500 guilders for Beyond Sleep. In characteristic sarcastic fashion, Hermans wrote a letter requesting the jury "to be so good to donate this small sum to Food for India", adding: "I will write a novel about [the jury] entitled Good Night, Sleep Tight." The Swedish translation of 1977 led literary critic Rolf Yrlid to wonder out loud when the Nobel Prize for Literature would go to the Netherlands. The German translation of 1982 led critic Joseph Quack to praise the abundance of "sparkling observations" and "a compelling story".

The novel is a staple for generations of Dutch high school students, and is praised for its prose style as well, the opening sentence ("The porter is disabled.") hailed as one of the best opening sentences in Dutch literature. In a 2002 poll, members of the Society for Dutch Literature ranked Beyond Sleep ninth in the Dutch canon of literary works (Hermans's The Darkroom of Damocles ranked fifth), and third in the canon since 1900 (with Darkroom ranking second, after Gerard Reve's De Avonden).

Reviewing the English translation Michel Faber wrote in The Guardian: "In the original Dutch, Hermans's prose is bracingly lucid and straightforward, justifying his reputation as a champion of unadorned style. Ina Rilke's translation is fluent and finds clever solutions to tough challenges (such as preserving the comic effect of conversations in which English is the foreign language), but overall the tone is more formal, more prim than it should be. ... Beyond Sleep is an engaging yarn once it hits its stride, intermittently thought-provoking, frequently funny, well worth investigating."

== Film version ==
In September 2013 NRC Handelsblad reported that the movie rights for an international, English-language production to be directed by Boudewijn Koole (Kauwboy) had been sold. On January 27, 2016, the English language film version, under the title Beyond Sleep, premiered at the Rotterdam Film Festival. The film was directed by Boudewijn Koole, with Reinout Scholten van Aschat in the lead. It received mixed reviews.

== Sources ==
=== Textual Studies ===
- Janssen, Frans A. en Sonja van Stek (in Dutch). (2005). Bibliographical Description of all Editions of Beyond Sleep. Frans A. Janssen en Sonja van Stek, Het bibliografische universum van Willem Frederik Hermans [The Bibliographical Universe of Willem Frederik Hermans]. Tweede, herziene en uitgebreide versie in samenwerking met Peter Kegel, Willem Frederik Hermans Instituut, 2005, 122–134.
- Editors of the Huygens ING (in Dutch), Textual History, Adopted Readings and Emendations in Beyond Sleep (1966)

=== Criticism ===
- Boef, August Hans den (in Dutch). (1984). [Book detailing the Plot Summary, Structure, Style, Themes, Reception, Publication History.] Over Nooit meer slapen van Willem Frederik Hermans. Amsterdam: De Arbeiderspers.
- Haasse, Hella S. (in Dutch). (2000). 'Lethal Ice and Heavenly Stones.' In: Hella S. Haasse, Lezen achter de letters, Querido, Amsterdam, 2000, 153–182.
- Janssen, Frans A (in Dutch). (1985). "Hermans, Willem Frederik." G.J. van Bork and P.J. Verkruijsse, The Dutch and Flemish Authors from Medieval Times to the Present, Including the Frisian Authors. Weesp: De Haan.
- Raat, G.F.H. (in Dutch). (1989). "Alfred and His Mirror Image. Narrative Voice in Beyond Sleep.". In: Wilbert Smulders (red.), Verboden toegang. Essays over het werk van Willem Frederik Hermans gevolgd door een vraaggesprek met de schrijver. De Bezige Bij, Amsterdam 1989, p. 204-228. Retrieved 1 September 2014.
- Valk, Arno van der (in Dutch). (2002). [Reconstruction of Hermans's travels to Spain, Sweden, Norway, South-Africa, and more.] Hermans: Het grootste gelijk buiten Nederland. Soesterberg: UItgeverij Aspekt.
