= Maand van het Spannende Boek =

The Maand van het Spannende Boek (June) is a Dutch theme month to promote literary genres of "exciting books" (detectives, thrillers) and is organized by the Collectieve Propaganda van het Nederlandse Boek.

== Background ==
This promotion began with a name in 1989. In May 1989 the foundation CPNG garnered extra publicity for the genre of "the exciting book". This was done by promoting a book published by Tomas Ross, "Mode voor Moskou" ("Fashion for Moscow") that sold at a reduced price (4.95 gulden). The last chapter was left omitted, and there was a competition attached: "Who is the murderer?". The prize was a "Detective-weekend for two" in England valued at f 2499. The disclosure of the perpetrator and the announcement of the winner found a place in the NOS Television program TV 3 on May 23, 1989. The last chapter could then be collected by presenting a voucher to the booksellers. The Gouden Strop was also awarded in the same program.

The action was a success, in the succeeding year there was a 'promotion-period' set between May 21 and June 1990. This time there was a prize in the same manner as Boekenweek and Kinderboekenweek. It was the booklet "and a Press Conference to lock...", a simple stapled edition of 32 pages. There was also a competition attached: "Who wrote this bloodcurdling football thriller?". This time the prize consisted of two tickets to the finale of the 1990 FIFA World Cup in Rome on July 8. Participants could choose from David Endt (Press officer of Ajax, writer of (among other works) "The Shadow of San Siro"), Arie Haan (ex-footballer, trainer), Youp van 't Hek (comedian, NRC Handelsblad sports columnist), Kees Jansma (head of NOS Studio Sport, Voetball International columnist), Theo Jockes (writer of (among others) "Murder in the Ridderzaal" and the novel "The Departure") and Jan Mulder (ex-footballer, sport columnist in de Volkskrant). The disclose of the name of the author and the announcement of the winner found a place on the Prime Time Show of RTL Véronique on June 28.

In 1991 a fixed month (June) and name ("Maand van het Spannende Boek") were chosen. This event also selected a promotion-edition book for a reduced amount (f 5.-). "Broeinest" by Frederick Forsyth was adapted for special by the CPNB Foundation and completed a deal in July 1991 for the new book "De Verrader", also translated as "The Deceiver". A booklet was supplied with discount coupons of f 5.- per piece for 19 other 'exciting books'. The idea of including a "competition" was abandoned.

In 1992, 1993 en 1994 the 'Maand' was designed in the same manner: a booklet for a reduced price (5 gulden) and a booklet with discount coupons of f 5,- per piece in to be used with 20 other 'exciting books'.

A definitive prize was chosen in 1995, with a minimum purchase of f 29.50 Dutch-language books. The first prize was "In de val" by Dean Koontz. An attempt was then made in 1998 to also involve children in the promotion (The booklet "Het uur van de haan" by Thea Dubelaar, sold for one gulden) but this attempt was not repeated.

In 2004 the minimum sales price was increased (to 13.45 euro - this was approximately the same as the old minimum of f 29.50 - 12.50 euros). In that year the public library was also involved, with a (for library members) a free prize: "Plaatsen van misdaad. Fragmenten uit dertien topthrillers" ("Places of Crime: Excerpts from the top thirteen thrillers"). Prizes continued to be awarded in 2005 and 2006: "In eigen kring. Fragmenten uit tien topthrillers" ("In their own circle. Excerpts from the top ten thrillers") (2005) and "Goed fout. Fragmenten uit misdaadverhalen van bekroonde auteurs" ("Good Error. Excerpts from the crime stories by award-winning authors"). The prize was revived in 2011 with "Stille getuigen: sporen van misdaad in 25 verhalen van de beste thrillerauteurs van dit moment" ("Silent Witnesses: traces of crime in 25 stories from the best thriller writers of the moment").

Beginning in 2007 a special evening named 'Evening of the Exciting Book: The Power of Plots was arranged. The first evening was on June 20, 2007. In the following years the evening was shifted to the beginning of the month: June 3, 2008, June 2, 2009, June 1, 2010.

== Prize books ==
In the Maand van het Spannende Boek, just as during the Boekenweek, a prize book is given away when a certain amount was spent. These books were:

- 2014: Incendio, Tess Gerritsen
- 2013: Nooit alleen, Loes den Hollander
- 2012: De ooggetuige, Simone van der Vlugt
- 2011: Versluiering, Rita Monaldi and Francesco Sorti
- 2010: Onmacht, Charles den Tex
- 2009: Erken mij, Esther Verhoef
- 2008: Onbegrepen, Karin Slaughter
- 2007: Afgunst, Saskia Noort
- 2006: Schuld & Boete, Ian Rankin
- 2005: Als broer en zus, René Appel
- 2004: Het graf, Henning Mankell
- 2003: De klokkenluider, Tomas Ross
- 2002: Verlies, Nicci French
- 2001: Dovemansoren, Rinus Ferdinandusse
- 2000: Nachtwerk, David Baldacci
- 1999: De tondeldoos, Minette Walters
- 1998: Gedumpt, James Ellroy
- 1997: Rookgordijn, Phillip Margolin
- 1996: Betrapt, Elizabeth George
- 1995: In de val, Dean Koontz
- 1994: Autopsie, Robin Cook
- 1993: Goudkoorts op de renbaan, Dick Francis
- 1992: Dolan's Cadillac, Stephen King
- 1991: Broeinest, Frederick Forsyth
- 1990: En een persconferentie tot slot..., Kees Jansma
- 1989: Mode voor Moskou, Tomas Ross'

== Maand van het christelijke spannende boek ==
For years in the month of June there was also special attention giving to "Exciting Books" in Christian bookstores. Thrillers, fantasty books and thriller novels are given extra limelight. The Christian bookstores have their own (Christian) action book that is given as a gift in June from one of the specially chosen "top titles".
