= Rudy Kousbroek =

Dutch poet, translator, and writer

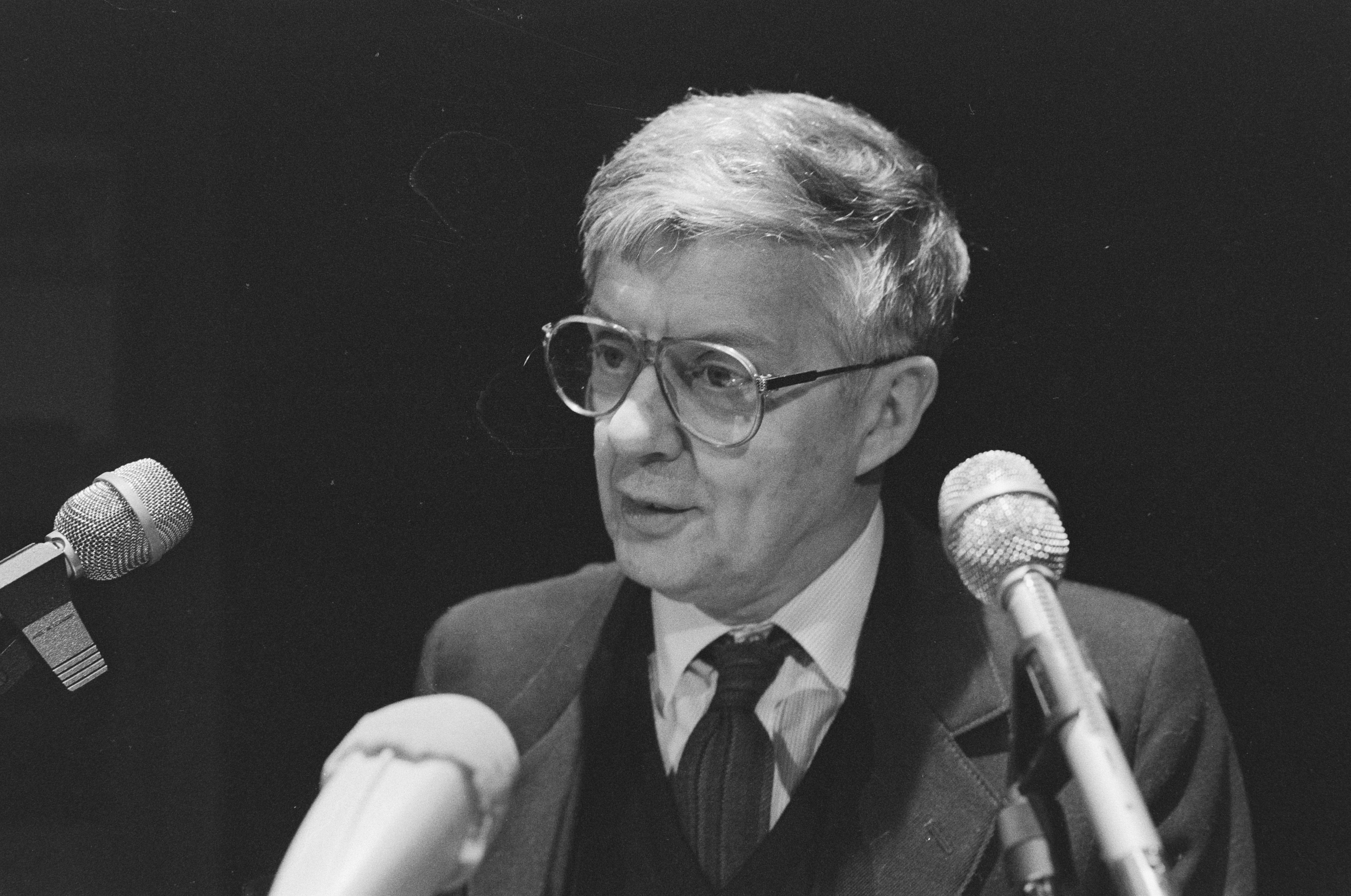
- Born: Herman Rudolf Kousbroek; 1 November 1929; Pematang Siantar, Sumatra, Dutch East Indies
- Died: 4 April 2010 (aged 80); Leiden, Netherlands
- Occupations: Poet, translator, writer, essayist

Herman Rudolf "Rudy" Kousbroek (1 November 1929 – 4 April 2010) was a Dutch poet, translator, writer and first of all essayist. He was a prominent figure in Dutch cultural life between 1950 and 2010 and one of the most outspoken atheists in the Netherlands. In 1975 he was awarded the P.C. Hooft Prize for his essays.

His principal work is the book Het Oostindisch kampsyndroom (The East Indian Camp Syndrome), a compilation of critical essays that are in one way or the other related to the Dutch East Indies and clearly show his admiration for Dutch Indo-Eurasian authors like E. du Perron, Tjalie Robinson, Beb Vuyk as well as Indonesian intellectual Sutan Sjahrir.

== Life ==
Rudy Kousbroek was born in Pematang Siantar, on the isle of Sumatra, in the Dutch East Indies. The first sixteen years of his life he lived there. During the Japanese occupation he and his family were imprisoned in a Japanese concentration camp. After World War II his family repatriated to the Netherlands.

He studied mathematics and physics in Amsterdam and Japanese in Paris. He never finished his studies, but he had thoroughly absorbed the culture of both the sciences and the humanities, what C. P. Snow has called The Two Cultures. Scientific thinking and empiricism remained the core of his world view.

He lived in France for many years but returned to the Netherlands in the early 1970s. He became for some time the moving spirit of the Cultural Supplement of NRC Handelsblad. His range of interests was very broad: he wrote poetry for children, analysed with subtlety human emotions, such as: longing, nostalgia, sexuality, love for cars, love for animals. Indonesian and Indo Eurasian culture and literature as well as the aftermath of colonialism remained a lifelong interest. He has written quite a lot about the visual arts and photography. He advocated a more prominent role of the natural sciences in intellectual discourse and education.

In the 1950s Kousbroek became friends with Willem Frederik Hermans, a Dutch writer who is considered one of the best Dutch writers of the 20th century. They had many interests in common: the scientific worldview, cars, typewriters, Ludwig Wittgenstein, Karl Popper, surrealism, atheism, literature. The friendship ended in the 1970s with a quarrel about the reliability of Friedrich Weinreb's memoirs. The correspondence between Hermans, Kousbroek and Ethel Portnoy, who was Kousbroek's wife at the time, has been published under the title Machines en emoties (2009) (Machines and emotions).

Another renowned Dutch writer, Gerard Reve, has also been on friendly terms with Kousbroek. But there remained a gap between the rationalist Kousbroek and the Roman Catholic convert Reve. The latter mocked Kousbroek and his rationalism in his novel Het boek van violet en dood (1996) (The book of violet and death).

Kousbroek had been married to Ethel Portnoy. He later married the Irish writer Sarah Hart. He had three children, two with Ethel Portnoy and one with Sarah Hart. His daughter, Hepzibah Kousbroek (1954–2009) became a writer. His son Gabriël Kousbroek became a professional illustrator. Rudy Kousbroek died aged 80 in Leiden.

He sometimes used the pen names Leopold de Buch or Fred Coyett.

== Work ==
Kousbroek started his literary career with two books of poetry: Tien variaties op het bestiale (1951) (Ten variations on things bestial) and De begrafenis van een keerkring (1953) (The burial of a tropic). He soon decided that writing essays was his real métier.

With Remco Campert, a school friend, he founded the magazine Braak in May 1950. The magazine lasted only for two years, but was important for the development of the 'Vijftigers' (Dutch poets of the fifties). In 1972 he was the first to deliver the annual Huizinga Lecture and its subject was Ethology and the Philosophy of Culture. In 1975 he won the P.C. Hooft Award, one of the most prestigious literary awards in the Netherlands. In 1994 he received an honorary degree in philosophy from the University of Groningen in the Netherlands.

Kousbroek's love for animals has inspired several of his books, from De aaibaarheidsfactor (1969) (Kousbroek coined the term, something like: 'caressability factor') to Medereizigers; over de liefde tussen mensen en dieren (2009) (Travel companions. On the love between humans and animals).

Kousbroek has translated Exercices de style by Raymond Queneau (Stijloefeningen, 1978) and wrote an introduction to the Dutch translation of Ombres chinoises by Simon Leys (Chinese schimmen, 1976; in English: Chinese shadows), a book that encouraged intellectuals in the Western world to revise their image of Mao Zedong and the Cultural Revolution.

Kousbroek's magnum opus is Het Oostindisch kampsyndroom (The East Indian Camp Syndrome). The book is primarily a polemic with the spokesmen of the (r)emigrated people from the Dutch East Indies after the end of the Dutch colonial period, most notably among them Jeroen Brouwers, who holds the view, mistakenly and implicitly racist according to Kousbroek, that the hardships of the Japanese concentration camps in the East Indies during World War II are of the same order of atrocity as the hardships of the German concentration camps in Europe. The book contains also reminiscences of Kousbroek's youth in the Dutch East Indies, essays on related literature, and reviews.

== Publications ==
- 1951 – Tien variaties op het bestiale (poetry)
- 1953 – De begrafenis van een keerkring (poetry)
- 1968 – Revolutie in een industriestaat (alias: Leopold de Buch)
- 1969 – de aaibaarheidsfactor
- 1969 – Anathema's 1
- 1970 – Het avondrood der magiërs
- 1970 – Anathema's 2
- 1970 – Het gemaskerde woord. Anathema's 1, 2 en 3
- 1971 – Een kuil om snikkend in te vallen
- 1971 – Anathema's 3
- 1973 – Ethologie en cultuurfilosofie
- 1978 – Een passage naar Indië
- 1978 – Stijloefeningen (translation of Exercices de style by Raymond Queneau)
- 1978 – De Aaibaarheidsfactor, gevolgd door Die Wacht am IJskast (extended re-issue of 1969)
- 1979 – Anathema's 4, De waanzin aan de macht
- 1981 – Vincent en het geheim van zijn vaders lichaam (alias: Fred Coyett)
- 1983 – Wat en Hoe in het Kats
- 1984 – De logologische ruimte
- 1984 – Anathema's 5. Het meer der herinnering
- 1985 – Het rijk van Jabeer. Getransformeerde sprookjes
- 1987 – Lief Java
- 1987 – Nederland: een bewoond gordijn
- 1988 – Een zuivere schim in een vervuilde schepping
- 1988 – Dagelijkse wonderen
- 1988 – Anathema's 7, De onmogelijke liefde
- 1989 – Morgen spelen wij verder
- 1989 – De archeologie van de auto
- 1990 – Einsteins poppenhuis, Essays over filosofie 1
- 1990 – Het Paleis in de verbeelding
- 1990 – Lieve kinderen hoor mijn lied
- 1992 – Anathema's 6, Het Oostindisch kampsyndroom
- 1993 – Anathema's 8, De vrolijke wanhoop
- 1993 – Varkensliedjes
- 1995 – Terug naar Negri Pan Erkoms
- 1997 – Hoger honing
- 1998 – Verloren goeling
- 2000 – In de tijdmachine door Japan
- 2003 – Opgespoorde wonderen: fotosynthese
- 2003 – Die Winterreise (audio-book)
- 2003 – Dierentalen en andere gedichten (poetry)
- 2005 – Verborgen verwantschappen: fotosynthese
- 2005 – Het Oostindisch kampsyndroom (extended re-issue)
- 2006 – De archeologie van de auto (extended re-issue)
- 2007 – Het raadsel der herkenning: fotosynthese 3
- 2009 – Medereizigers; over de liefde tussen mensen en dieren
- 2009 – Machines en emoties correspondence Willem Frederik Hermans, Rudy Kousbroek and Ethel Portnoy between 1955 and 1978
- 2010 – Anathema's 9, Restjes

== Sources ==
- File Rudy Kousbroek (DBNL)
- Obituary Rudy Kousbroek in NRC-Handelsblad, 4 April 2010
