= Nico Jesse =

Dutch physician and photographer (1911–1976)

Nico Adriaan Jesse
- Born: 22 August 1911; Rotterdam, Netherlands
- Died: 21 January 1976 (aged 64); Bergen (Limburg), Netherlands
- Education: University of Utrecht
- Occupations: Photographer & medical doctor
- Years active: as a photographer: 1930-1971
- Spouse(s): Ro Dommering (m. 1937) Margreet de Vries (m.1942); Christine (Ute) Vallance (nee Fischinger) (m. 1961)
- Children: 5

Nico Jesse (22 August 1911 – 21 January 1976) was a Dutch humanist photographer and photojournalist, later, he became a commercial and advertising photographer. Originally a physician, he combined his work as a doctor with his passion for photography until, in 1955, he gave up his medical practice to devote himself exclusively to photography, producing imagery for several companies’ annual reports and business documents. He also made a large number of books about cities and countries in Europe and mounted exhibitions of the images, the most famous being Women of Paris (1954), and contributed to a mass observation project of Nazi-occupied Utrecht. In 1962 Nico Jesse took up his original profession again and at his death in 1976, left a large photographic oeuvre, in which people and their everyday activities are the focus.

== Biography ==
Nico Adriaan Jesse was born on 22 August 1911 in Rotterdam, the son of well-to-do grocer Adrianus Arnoldus Jesse and Maria Geertruida Adeletta Jesse-Rothmeijer. In 1918 the family moved to Velp where Nico Jesse attended the Christian Lyceum in Arnhem, where he was encouraged in his growing interest in photography.

== Commencement of careers in medicine and photography ==
From 1930 to 1931 Jesse studied medicine, moving to the Oudegracht 44 in Utrecht where as a member of the Utrecht Student Corps he made twelve surreal toned photo collages for their Almanac illustrating themes from student life for each month.

Otto Tussenbroek critiqued Jesse's photographs in the 1935 Elsevier's Geïllustreerd Maandschrift (Monthly Illustrated Review) and his work is included in Modern Photography: The Studio Annual of Camera Art 1935-1936 in which he writes: "I have taken photographs for about seven years now without help or teaching from anyone. My opinion is that long theoretical essays on 'Art Photography' are no good for the man who wants to make art photographs. A photograph is good or not good, and an art photograph is not to be made by means of brainwork.".

Jesse received his medical internship in 1937 and the same year married his high school sweetheart Ro Dommering and they take up residence in open-plan flexible housing built by Gerrit Rietveld on Erasmuslaan 3 in Utrecht. Meanwhile, he was accepted for participation in the 1937 exhibition of photography at the Stedelijk Museum in Amsterdam. The following year Jesse continued in a co-assistant position at the University Hospital in Utrecht, passing his semi-final medical examination. He lived with his wife Ro for three months in the Montparnasse district of Paris, and on return worked as general practitioner.

Gerrit Rietveld opened the first solo exhibition by Nico Jesse at art dealer Wagenaar's at Nieuwe Gracht 25 Utrecht. In 1941, Rietveld wrote in the journal Kleinbeeld-foto in response to this exhibition, that the essence of a photograph "(is) the characteristic of movement, devoid of anything that does not directly participate in this movement or to which the movement does not give a certain character.".

On his return to the University Hospital in Utrecht, he met nurse Margreet de Vries whom he married in December 1942 after separating from Ro.

== Professional photographer ==
During the Nazi occupation of the Netherlands Jesse was commissioned by Utrecht municipality archivist JWC van Campen to carry out a visual documentation of life in that city. He made 400 black and white photos and 136 colour slides which, with the more than 1,000 colour slides by Alphons Hunstinx (Dutch Institute for War Documentation), is the largest collection of colour images in which the daily life of a Dutch city is documented during the occupation. The destruction of Rotterdam in May 1940, and the strategic importance of Utrecht as a railway junction and industrial zone provided the impetus, and Jesse carried out the photography in the winter and summer of 1942, incidentally capturing the imposed anti-Semitism.

His eldest daughter Wendela is born in May 1943, followed by Maggie (1945) and Rutger (1946) and the young family takes up residence in Ameide in South Holland, where he takes a practice. In 1947 the doctor's house is rebuilt by Rietveld, after which the births of Anita (1949) and Colette (1951) follow. During this period Jesse is assisted in his photographic work by Jan Versnel (1924-2007). His first book Utrecht As It Is is published in 1950. Books on other countries follow, including Spain (1955), the French Riviera (1956), London (1959), Rome (1960), Berlin (1960) and Paris again (1962) and his archive contains several dummies for proposals on a wide variety of topics, including flamenco dancers, the liberation of Ameide in 1945 and sculpture in the Netherlands. In 1953, he was commissioned by the Society for the Exploitation of Limburg Coal Mines to produce photos and design for a book on Oranje Nassau Mines and he was rarely short of commissions through the remaining 1950s and the 60s. His Women of Paris (1954) was so successful that it was published by the same publishing house, Bruna, in a paperback edition. Both Women of Paris and Orange Nassau Mines were nominated best designed books of the year 1954 by the commission for the collective promotion of Dutch Book (CPNB).

Given the success of Women of Paris and due to his increasing work as a photographer for the Paviljoen voor de Volksgezond (Pavilion of Public Health) at the 1955 Nationale Energie Manifestatie E ’55 (Exposition) in Rotterdam, Jesse abandoned his general practice to concentrate on photography. The family settled on the estate Over Holland in Loenen aan de Vecht, equidistant from and between Amsterdam and Utrecht. Edward Steichen invites Nico Jesse, along with fellow Netherlandaise photographers Emmy Andriesse, Eva Besnyö, Ed van der Elsken, Henk Jonker, Cas Oorthuys and Hans Schreiner, to participate in the 1955 exhibition The Family of Man at the Museum of Modern Art in New York. Jesse then joins the Dutch Photographers Patrons Association (NFPV) and in 1956 publishes Visiting the French Riviera and Footsteps of Rembrandt with Bruna. Another book is commissioned by textile factory N.J. Menko N.V. and exhibited in the town hall of Enschede. Jesse mounts a second solo exhibition at Art Trading Wagenaar in Utrecht which is again opened by Gerrit Rietveld. He is joined by novelist and artist Willem Frederik Hermans (1921-1995) for several months in 1957 as his voluntary assistant. At the time, Hermans was writing his De donkere kamer van Damocles (The Darkroom of Damocles) which features a mysteriously blank photograph.

The following year he meets German journalist Christine (Ute) Vallance (born Fischinger) (1922-2004) and she acts as his guide on a trip to Berlin, where he photographs for publisher Van Loghum Slaterus. Though the book does not appear in the Netherlands, it is titled Menschen in Berlin and in 1960 released by Sigbert Mohn Verlag in Germany. He does not return to Over Holland, though Margreet remains there, but after a short stay in the Netherlands, Ute Fischinger and Jesse go to Paris and live in a caravan on the Quai Henri-IV. In the following year they collaborate on the book Paris and are married in May 1961 in Ticino, Switzerland. Thereafter, until 1971, Jesse works in the service of the meat processor Homburg, photographing for annual reports, trade displays and advertising, combining this with his freelance commercial photography, resigning after a disagreement on an advertising campaign. In financial straits, he sells his photography equipment and stores his archive in an empty factory in Cuijk and takes up medically related work in Oss and then in insurance for GAK in Venlo.

He died unexpectedly on 21 January 1976, of cardiac arrest.

== Recognition ==
Jesse's widow Ute Jesse-Fischinger left his work in 1990 to the Dutch Photo Archive (now the Dutch Fotomuseum) in Rotterdam. Amongst his papers was discovered the introduction to an unspecified Jesse exhibition written by Paul Citroen in which he describes the photographer's work as taking the camera "by the short hairs" to show it life. With no formal training, wrote Citroen, Jesse could afford to ignore academic rules and the result is blurred photographs, which though technically inexact, are full of life; "technically minded professionals are from the perspective of art, quite irritating, and apt to make nasty comments about Jesse's pictures. But they cannot deny his boldness of approach and that he is able to capture life at its most interesting and exciting."

== Posthumous exhibitions ==
=== Solo exhibitions ===
- 2003 Nico Jesse. Nederlands Fotomuseum, 6 Sep – 16 Nov 2003

=== Group exhibitions ===
- 2012 Dutch Photographers in Paris l'Atelier Néerlandais, Gare du Nord, France, 24 May – 29 Jul 2012
- 2012 Dutch photographers in Paris 1900-1968. Fotomuseum Den Haag 15 Oct 2011 – 15 Jan 2012
- 2005 Dexia FotoFestival Naarden: Made in Holland. Stedelijk Museum Schiedam, 14 May – 12 Jun 2005
- 2005 Paris was great!: Dutch photographers in Paris 1945-1965. Nederlands Fotomuseum, 4 Sep 2004 – 9 Jan 2005
- 2003 Zwarte Rook: Fotografie en steenkool in de twintigste eeuw. Nederlands Fotomuseum, 10 Nov 2002 – 12 Jan 2003

== Selected publications ==
- 1950 Zó is Utrecht. Amsterdam, Lankamp & Brinkman, 1950
- 1952 Hella S. Haasse / Nico Jesse [Foto's] / A.I.J.M. Schellart. Het versterkte huis : kastelen in Nederland. Amsterdam : Bezige Bij, 1952
- 1953 Oranje Nassau Mijnen. Heerlen, N.V. Maatschappij tot exploitatie van Limburgsche Steenkolenmijnen, 1953.
- 1954 Maurois, Andre and Jesse, Nico (Photographs) Vrouwen van Parijs Utrecht, A.W. Bruna & Zoon, 1954. First edition
- 1955 SPANJE - land en volk.Utrecht, A. W. Bruna & Zoon, 1955
- 1956 N.V. COQ - 1956. Utrecht
- 1956 Mensen van Menko: foto’s Nico Jesse, text Martie Verdenius. Enschede, N.J. Menko N.V., 1956. Published on the occasion of the centenary of N.J. Menko N.V. 1856–1956.
- 1956 Goldstein, Ella; Meijer, E.R.; Jesse, Nico. Voetsporen van Rembrandt : een beeldbiografie. Publisher Utrecht : A. W. Bruna & Zoons, 1956
- 1957 N.V. Vaalser Textiel Fabriek 1932 - 1957 VTF 25. Vaals, 1957
- 1959 Walther von Hollander (tekst), Unser Publikum, Gütersloh (Praesentverlag) 1959 (latere uitgave onder de titel: Der Mensch neben dir - ein Spiegel unserer Industriegesellschaft, Gütersloh (C. Bertelsmann Verlag) 1960).
- 1960 Porgy and Bess in foto's van Nico Jesse. Utrecht, Bruna, [1960]
- 1960 Mensen in Rome. Arnhem, Van Lochum Slaterus. 1960
- 1961 Visages de Paris] / Photos : Nico Jesse; Texte : Ute Vallance...; Préface de Jean Cocteau; [Traduit de l'allemand par Max Roth.]. Paris, Bruxelles : Éditions Sequoia, 1961
- 1962 Jaarverslag 1961 N.V. Levensverzekeringsmaatschappij 'Utrecht', Utrecht 1962.
- 1962 Voorzichtig. Jaarverslag 1961 Stichting Valkenheide Maasbergen, Maasbergen 1962.
- 1964 Jan Roelfs, Wij op de hei (uitgave ter gelegenheid van 50 jaar Valkenheide), Maasbergen (Stichting Valkenheide Maasbergen) 1964.
- 1965 Jaarverslag 1964 Homburg N.V. Vleeswarenfabriek Homburg N.V. Cuyk, Cuyk 1965.
- 1966 Parijs. Amsterdam, Elsevier, 1966.
- 1995 Het Werkmanmonument door Armando Groningen : Centrum Beeldende Kunst, 1995
- 2003 Haarlem, Focus Publishing, 2003. ISBN 9072216954

== Archive ==
1440 of Nico Jesse's captioned photographs may be found online at the Nederlands Fotomuseum (Dutch and English language)

== Bibliography ==
- Fotografie in Nederland 1940–1975, 1978 (Biografieën) (NFM)
- Fotografie in Nederland 1920–1940, 1979, Biografie p. 151 (NFM)
- Eskildsen, U. (ed.): "Subjektive Fotografie". Images of the 50s (tent.cat. San Francisco, 1984) (NFM)
- Leijerzapf, Ingeborg Th.: Het beslissende beeld (1991) (NFM)
- Nieuwsbrief Nederlands Fotoarchief 1992, II/2, Aug. Inlegvel (NFM)
- Bool, F. & Hekking, V.: De illegale camera (1995) (NFM)
- Bibliography NCC: 8 febr. 1996 (NFM)
- Thijsen, M.: Het bedrijfsfotoboek 1945-1965 (2002) (NFM)
- Leijerzapf, I. / Doris Wintgens Hötte: Foto's van vijftig (2003) (NFM)
- Documentatie fotocollectie Universiteitsbibliotheek Leiden
