= Diamanten Kogel =

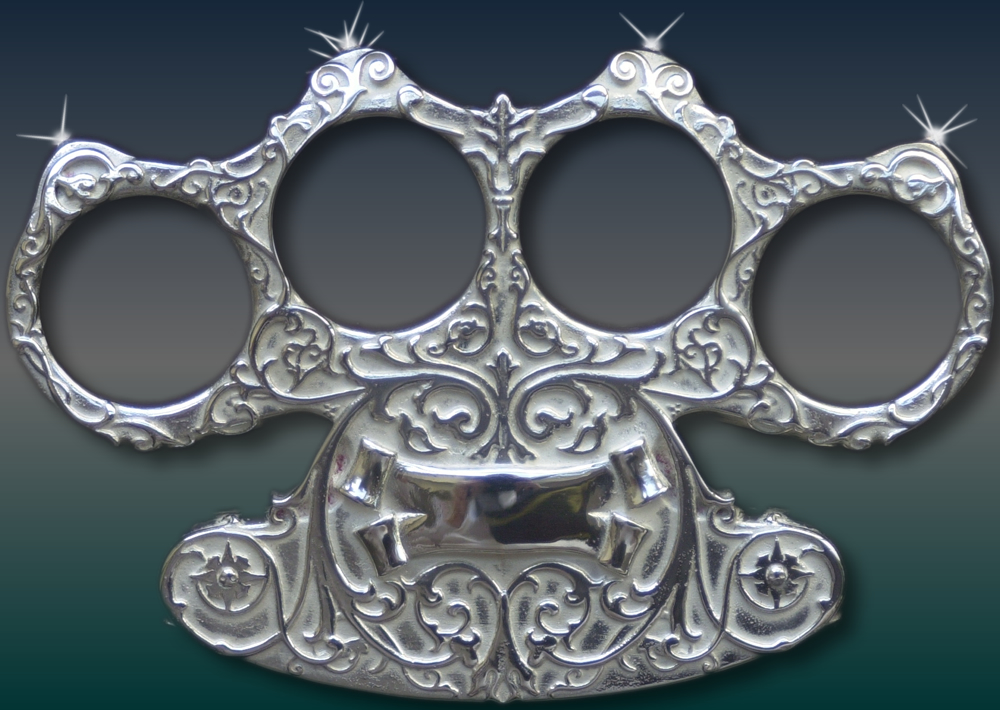
The Diamanten Kogel award

The Diamanten Kogel (i.e. Diamond Bullet) is an annual award for the best original Dutch crime novel. It is awarded by the Genootschap van Vlaamse Misdaadauteurs in Belgium. The Gouden Strop is its counterpart in the Netherlands.

The award consists of a silver knuckle-duster with four diamonds, designed by Wim Delvoye.

== Winners ==
- 2013: 2017 Rudy Soetewey
- 2012: Blauw Goud Almar Otten
- 2011: Roomservice Elvin Post
- 2010: Wrede schoonheid Mieke de Loof
- 2009: Stiletto Libretto Bavo Dhooge
- 2008: Pentito Simon de Waal
- 2007: Starr Patrick Conrad
- 2006: Het diepe water Felix Thijssen
- 2005: Onder druk Esther Verhoef
- 2004: Medeschuldig Bob Mendes
- 2003: Dossier K. Jef Geeraerts
- 2002: De Emerson locomotief Benny Baudewyns

== See also ==
- Dutch literature
