= CPNB =

CPNB may refer to:

- Continuous peripheral nerve block
- Collectieve Propaganda van het Nederlandse Boek, Dutch organisation promoting reading
