= Collectieve Propaganda van het Nederlandse Boek =

Dutch organization promoting Dutch literature

The Collectieve Propaganda van het Nederlandse Boek (CPNB, "Collective Promotion for the Dutch Book") is a Dutch organization that includes representatives of bookstores and publishers, whose goal is to promote Dutch literature.

== History and activities ==
The organization has been active since 1930. One of its main activities is organizing the annual Boekenweek (since 1932), a week-long, nationwide promotional event of Dutch books for adults and children. During Boekenweek the buying public is presented with the Boekenweekgeschenk ("Book Week Gift"), a free book given to purchasers of another Dutch-language book (above a certain value), or to those who become a member of a library. For the Boekenweekgeschenk, a Dutch author is commissioned by the CPNB; the sole exception to date was the 2001 selection, Woede ("Anger") by Salman Rushdie. There is a parallel Kinderboekenweekgeschenk ("Children's Book Week Gift") for children's literature, which takes place during the Kinderboekenweek held in October. The 2012 Boekenweekgeschenk was written by Tom Lanoye.

Recently added promotions include Maand van het Spannende Boek, a month-long event for crime novels, which opens with an awards ceremony called De Gouden Strop ("The Golden Noose"), which names the best Dutch crime novel of the year. Since 2006, the CPNB holds an annual Nederland leest ("The Netherlands Read") campaign in November, during which the work of a single Dutch author is highlighted and promoted. The 2012 campaign celebrates W.F. Hermans; a newly printed version of his 1958 classic, The Darkroom of Damocles, is given to all members of public libraries.

The organization also awards the Boekensleutel literary award.

== Controversy ==
Selections for the Boekenweekgeschenk were frequently criticized for being mediocre or even downright bad. While earlier selections were sometimes highly original (such as Hella Haasse's experimental novel Oeroeg in 1948), the organization is still accused of playing it safe, choosing established authors that appeal to broad sections of the population without possibly insulting anyone. In 1980, to counter criticism that previous offerings had been very weak, the CPNB managed to contract Gerard Reve, a controversial author and one of the "big four" Dutch writers (besides Willem Frederik Hermans, Harry Mulisch, and Jan Wolkers), to write the Boekenweekgeschenk for 1981, and negotiated with Reve that his work, The Fourth Man, would not discuss homosexual relations between men. Wim Hazeu, Reve's publisher, was also anxious to have him write the Boekenweekgeschenk, disappointed as he was with the "throwaway" selections from years past. Initially Reve was reluctant, but Hazeu talked him into it. As for Reve's promise to not touch on homosexual love at all, Hazeu afterward said, "You can't ask a cow to lay eggs." Reve's fee was set at 50,000 guilders.

Lieve Gerard

Zijn weemoed spreekt een eigen taal.
Het is de bron van zijn verhaal.
Hij is een clown die huilt en lacht.
Ik heb zijn stem zo vaak gehoord.
Zijn grootste wapen is het woord.
Een man die weinig meer verwacht,
maar hoop en liefde drijven 'm voort.

— Zangeres zonder Naam

After Reve sent him the first forty pages, CPNB director Dick Ouwehand told Hazeu that there were controversial passages which needed to be cut (though it is one of only a few novels by Reve to have a mainly heterosexual theme). Moreover, the book lacked suspense, he said, and the final version would be too long. In the end the book was refused by the CPNB; committee members liked the book but thought it unsuitable as a gift book for the general population. In turn, they contracted Henri Knap, a columnist from Amsterdam. Knap's De Ronde van '43 was panned by critics; Vrij Nederland called the book "old-fashioned, sleep-inducing, and absolutely unrealistic." The controversy was played out in the national media, with the Zangeres zonder Naam, a popular singer whose oeuvre Reve had publicly championed, singing a song, Lieve Gerard ("Dear Gerard"), on a TROS television show, De Boekenweek show. Reve had no complaints afterward and did receive his fee. Knap apparently never got over the negative reviews for Knap (the book was later described as an "all-time low" in the history of the Boekenweekgeschenk), while Reve's The Fourth Man was received positively and sold moderately well. In 1988, Reve wrote Elco Brinkman, then Minister of Health, Welfare and Sport, about the events (in a typically lengthy Revian complaint), and accompanied the letter with a copy of the book, so he could read it in the car on the way to and back from public engagements.
