= Like Two Drops of Water =

1963 Dutch film

- Directed by: Fons Rademakers
- Written by: Fons Rademakers
- Based on: The Darkroom of Damocles by Willem Frederik Hermans
- Produced by: Alfred Heineken; Fons Rademakers
- Starring: Lex Schoorel
- Cinematography: Raoul Coutard
- Edited by: Olga Servaas
- Release date: 21 February 1963
- Running time: 119 minutes
- Country: Netherlands
- Language: Dutch

Like Two Drops of Water (Dutch: Als twee druppels water) is a 1963 Dutch drama film directed by Fons Rademakers. It is an adaptation of the 1958 novel The Darkroom of Damocles by Willem Frederik Hermans. It was entered into the 1963 Cannes Film Festival and was selected as the Dutch entry for the Best Foreign Language Film at the 36th Academy Awards, but was not accepted as a nominee.

== Cast ==
- Lex Schoorel as Ducker / Dorbeck
- Nan Los as Marianne
- Van Doude as Inspector Wierdeman
- Guus Verstraete as Ebernuss
- Ko Arnoldi as Doctor
- Andrea Domburg as Marianne (voice)
- Jos Gevers as Uncle Frans
- Mia Goossen as Ria Ducker
- Elise Hoomans as Ducker's mother
- Sacco van der Made as German officer
- Hans Polman as Turlings
- Piet Römer
- Jules Royaards as Hubach
- Frans van der Lingen as Eckener
- Ina van der Molen as Elly
- John Van Eyssen
- Luc van Gent as Second inspector
- Marianne van Waveren as Fake Jugendstorm leader
- Ineke Verwayen as Jugendstorm leader
- Siem Vroom as Priest

== See also ==
- List of submissions to the 36th Academy Awards for Best Foreign Language Film
- List of Dutch submissions for the Academy Award for Best Foreign Language Film
