= Renate Rubinstein =

Dutch journalist and writer

Renate Ida Rubinstein
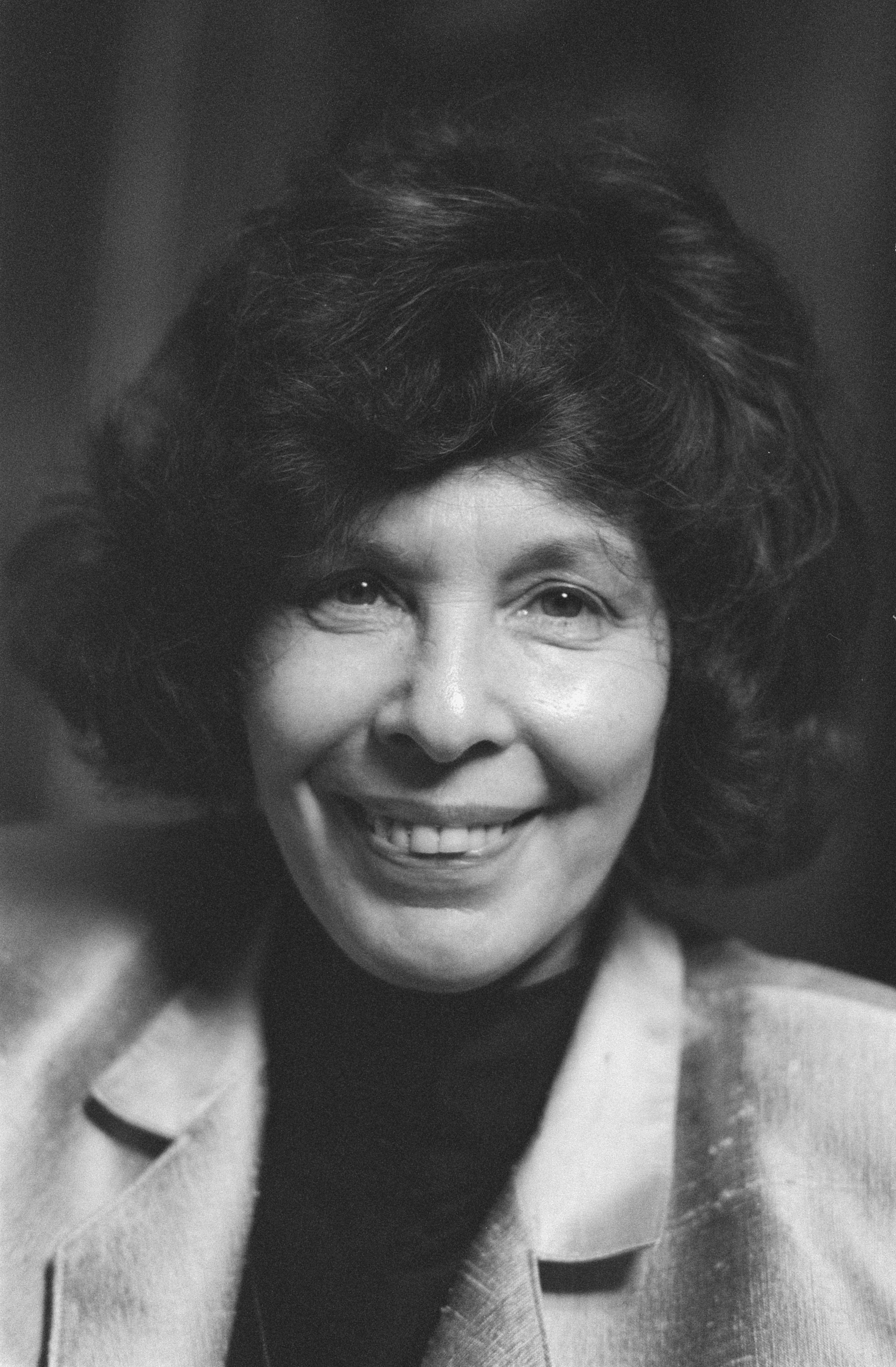
- Born: 16 November 1929; Berlin, Germany
- Died: 23 November 1990 (aged 61); Amsterdam, Netherlands
- Occupations: Writer, journalist, columnist
- Notable work: Jood in Arabië, Goi in Israël; Niets te verliezen en toch bang; Nee heb je
- Awards: Homage of the Lucas-Ooms Fund (1970); Multatuli Prize (1979); J. Greshof Prize (1987); Hélène de Montigny Prize (1988)

Renate Ida Rubinstein (16 November 1929 – 23 November 1990) was a German-Dutch writer, journalist and columnist.

== Biography ==
Rubinstein was born on 16 November 1929 in Berlin, Germany, to a Jewish father and non-Jewish mother. Following the rise of Nazi Germany, the Rubinstein family decided to leave the country, and fled to Amsterdam, from there on to London, Switzerland and eventually back to Amsterdam again.

Following the Battle of the Netherlands, when Nazi Germany invaded and conquered the Netherlands in 1940, Rubinstein's father was arrested. He was murdered in the Auschwitz concentration camp near the end of World War II. This event was a determining factor in Rubinstein's life and work - she is said to have spent the rest of her life searching for a father figure, and her bond with German-British sociologist Norbert Elias has been explained by some as proof for this.

During her teen years Rubinstein was a pupil at the Vossius Gymnasium in Amsterdam, but was sent away. For a time she worked three days a week at the publishing company G.A. van Oorschot, and lived together with jurist Willem Frederik van Leeuwen. Next she worked at a kibbutz in Israel for three years, and studied at the Hebrew University in Jerusalem for an additional two years. Because of that experience she was accepted as a student in Political and Social Science Studies at the University of Amsterdam in 1955. During her study - which she broke off after two years - Rubinstein started her career as a writer, first writing for the Nieuw Israëlitische Weekblad (New Israelite Weekly) and Propria Cures. Later on she wrote for Vrij Nederland (Free Netherlands, weekly magazine), Het Parool (national newspaper), the national daily NRC Handelsblad, the monthly magazine Avenue, Hollands Weekblad (Holland Weekly), Hollands Maandblad (Holland Monthly) and the literary magazine Tirade. In 1966 she was forced to pay a fine for her involvement in protests against the German Claus von Amsberg, who was about to marry princess Beatrix of the Netherlands, although she publicly changed her mind about him for the better later. She was even asked to write a book about the crown prince Willem-Alexander when he turned 18. In 1968 Rubinstein played an important role in an attempt to rehabilitate the Jewish collaborator posturing as a resistance fighter, Friedrich Weinreb.

Her weekly columns in Vrij Nederland, which started to appear in 1962 under the pseudonym Tamar, were very popular and often provoked furious debates with other columnists, like Hugo Brandt Corstius and W.F. Hermans. The latter objected fiercely in an essay about Collaboratie en verzet (Collaboration and resistance) to the - according to Hermans - unreasonable and unfounded attack on a Jewish woman Bep Turksma in the "autobiography" of Friedrich Weinreb, which had been edited by Rubinstein and her ex-husband Aad Nuis. Though her heart was on the left in the political sense, she often ruffled feathers in left-wing circles with her misgivings about feminism, totalitarian socialism as it had developed in Eastern Europe and Maoist China, and nuclear pacifism. In 1982 Renate Rubinstein delivered the Huizinga Lecture in Leiden, the Netherlands, under the title: Links en rechts in de politiek en in het leven (Left and right in politics and life).

Rubinstein was diagnosed with multiple sclerosis in 1977. This brought about great changes in her life, which she outlined in her book Nee heb je (translated into English under the title Take It and Leave It: Aspects of Being Ill) (1985). Rubinstein died on 23 November 1990 in Amsterdam at the age of 61. She was buried at the Amsterdam Zorgvlied cemetery.

Shortly after her death, her book Mijn beter ik (My better self) was published in which she revealed that she had had a secret affair with Simon Carmiggelt for several years. Before that she had been married to Aad Nuis, and later Jaap van Heerden.

Rubinstein's younger sister, Gerda Rubinstein, is a sculptor.

== Prizes ==
- 1970 - Homage of the Lucas-Ooms Fund in Haarlem for her book Jood in Arabië, Goi in Israël (Jew in Arabia, Goi in Israel)
- 1979 - Multatuli Prize given by the city of Amsterdam for her work Niets te verliezen en toch bang (Nothing to lose and yet afraid)
- 1987 - J. Greshof Prize given by the Jan Campert Foundation for Nee heb je (Take It and Leave It: Aspects of Being Ill )
- 1988 - Hélène de Montigny Prize

== Selected works ==
Translated in English

- Renate Rubinstein: Take It and Leave It. Aspects of Being Ill. Transl. of: Nee heb je. Notities over ziek zijn, by Karin Fierke and Aad Janssen. London, Marion Boyers, 1989. ISBN 0-7145-2883-8
