= Hannemieke Stamperius =

Dutch feminist writer and critic (1943–2022)

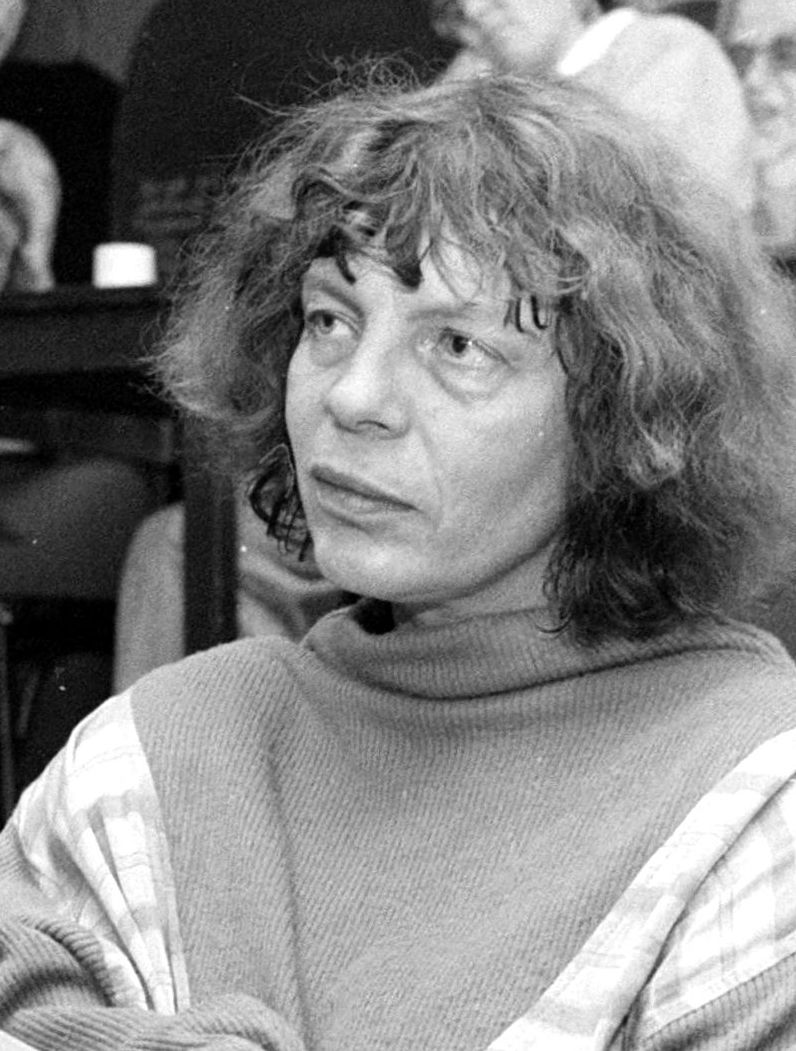
Stamperius in 1990

Johanna Maria Jelles (Hannemieke) Stamperius (12 September 1943 in Tiel – 22 November 2022 in Amsterdam) was a Dutch feminist writer and critic. She published literary criticism and feminist scholarship under her own name, and literary work under the pseudonyms Hannes Meinkema. She used the pseudonym Justa Abbing to write four other novels, mostly thrillers.

Her third novel En dan is er koffie (1976), is considered an important early Dutch feminist novel; she was praised for her descriptions of the everyday life of women, and is considered the godmother of Dutch feminist literature.

== Biography and career ==
Stamperius used a masculine first name, Hannes, to publish her early fiction, given the position of women in the literary marketplace of the 1970s. Her first novel published under that name was De maaneter (1974). Her different pseudonyms reflected different phases of her life. She published one book (in 1974, on the Belgian writer Louis Paul Boon) as Annemieke Postma-Nelemans, "Postma" being the name of her stepfather, and "Nelemans" the name of the man she was briefly married to. She got literary and commercial recognition with her third novel, En dan is er koffie ("And then, there's coffee") in 1976, as second-wave feminism took hold of the Netherlands; the "fiercely realistic" book became the first Dutch feminist bestseller, placing in the top ten of Dutch books for months and being reprinted ten times in a few years. In 1978, she and Ethel Portnoy founded a literary journal for writing by women, Chrysallis.

As with many many women writers, the personal life often steers the writing, and Stamperius's work reflects that. In 1987, she became one of the first single mothers of an adopted child in the Netherlands, when she adopted her daughter from Brazil. Her 1992 novel Moeders kindje ("Mother's child") tells that story, and after the adoption motherhood appeared frequently in her work, including "poopy diapers and other frustrations".

Between 1997 and 2004, Stamperius published four books as Justa Abbing. The first two were thrillers, whose main character is the feminist writer Justa van Randwijck, who publishes under the pseudonym Justa Abbing. In Schoonheid, schoonheid ("Beauty, beauty", 1997) Abbing deals with a disabled writer, and in Leraar leerling ("Teacher student", 1998), Abbing is a substitute teacher at a secondary school who is confronted with a murder.

Stamperius, in the last years of her life, suffered from a bone disease which caused her crippling pains. While she continued to write, including on religious philosophy, her work was no longer published. She died on 22 November 2022.

== Honors and legacy ==
Stamperius received an annual stipend from the Stichting Fonds voor de Letteren, a Dutch non-profit organization that supports writers. partially on the recommendation of Renate Dorrestein, who referred to Stamperius, who was her mentor for her first novels, as her "literary stepmother".

In 1989 Stamperius received the Annie Romeinprijs, an award given to writers who contribute to the development and emancipation of women, for her entire oeuvre.

Stamperius is praised for her activism as an anthologist of women's writing, having anthologized the work of Dutch- and English-language women writers. She was responsible for reissues of books by Betje Wolff and Aagje Deken, Geertruida Bosboom-Toussaint, and Vita Sackville West (for whom her daughter is named).

== Bibliography ==
=== As Annemieke Postma-Nelemans ===
- Het perspectief in 'Menuet' (1974, criticism, H.D. Tjeenk Willink, on Louis Paul Boon's Menuet, ISBN 9001185797)

=== As Hannemieke Stamperius ===
- Zie je wel: verhalen over vrouwen door vrouwen (1980, short stories from English-language women writers, ISBN 906019666X)
- Vrouwen en literatuur: een inleiding (1980, essay, ISBN 9789062878796)
- 24 manieren om in tranen uit te breken: Nederlandse verhalen door vrouwen over vrouwen (1981, ISBN 9060197569)
- Kind met zes tenen (1986, collection of stories by Dutch women writers, ISBN 9025466737)
- In haar uppie (1987, short stories by contemporary English-language women writers, ISBN 9025467148)
- Het verbeelde beest (1988, essay, ISBN 902546727X)
- Onder twee ogen (1988, anthology of diary selections by English-language women writers, ISBN 9025467369)
- Weet je nog, die baby ben jij (1989, children's book, illustrated by Magda van Tilburg, ISBN 9000027012)
- Op eigen hand (1989, anthology of diary selections mostly by Dutch and Flemish authors, ISBN 9025466982)
- Een om mee te praten (1990, zeventien verschillende schrijfsters geven in een kort verhaal hun visie op de ideale man, ISBN 9025468152)
- Een schrale troost (1991, stories by contemporary Dutch women writers, ISBN 9025469124)
- In haar dromen (1992, stories by contemporary English-language women writers on happiness, ISBN 9025403727)
- Moeders kindje (1992, autobiography, ISBN 902540121X)
- Moeder en kind (1993, stories by contemporary foreign women writers on the relationship between mother and child, ISBN 9025400175)
- Moeders mooiste (1994, stories by contemporary Dutch women writers on the relationship between mother and child, ISBN 9025408516)
- Vrouwen van de wereld in 1000 bladzijden (1996, stories by contemporary women writers, ISBN 9025405207)
- Het meisje van Loch Ness (1996, young adults, ISBN 9024525926)
- Mijn moeder houdt niet van Brazilië (2001, young adults, ISBN 9024543517)
- God verzameld (2004, anthology of Dutch stories and poems about God, ISBN 9025422748)
- Kleine theologie voor leken en ongelovigen (2005, ISBN 9025955665)
- De Wadden: de mooiste verhalen over de zee en de eilanden (2007, ISBN 9789046700693)
- God en de Verlichting (2011, philosophy of religion, ISBN 9490708224)
- Judy wil een peer (2016, first volume in a series of children's books

=== As Hannes Meinkema ===
- De maaneter (1974, novel, Contact, ISBN 9025467741)
- Het wil nog maar niet zomeren (1975, short stories, Elsevier, ISBN 9025466265)
- En dan is er koffie (1976, novel, Contact, ISBN 902546761X)
- De groene weduwe en andere grijze verhalen (1978, short stories, Elsevier, ISBN 9025468454)
- Het binnenste ei (1978, novel, Manteau, ISBN 9010021955)
- Moedertocht (1978, short stories with photographs by Geert Hendrickx, Knippenberg (Bulkboek no. 79)
- Het persoonlijke is poëzie (1979, poetry, Elsevier, ISBN 9010027686)
- De naam van mijn moeder (1980, short stories, Contact, ISBN 9025468659)
- De driehoekige reis (1981, novel, Contact, ISBN 9025469175)
- Op eigen tenen (1982, short stories, Contact, ISBN 9025469035
- Te kwader min (1984, novel, Pandora, ISBN 9025455107)
- Eén keer over (1986, short stories, Contact, ISBN 902546839X)
- Het kind en de rekening ( 1987, short stories, Contact, ISBN 9025469787)
- Mooie horizon (1989, novel, Contact, ISBN 9025467083)
- Een geluid als van onweer (1993, short stories, Contact, ISBN 902540037X)
- De speeltuin van Teiresias (1994, novel, Pandora, ISBN 9025457134)
- Dora - een geschiedenis (1995, novel, Pandora]], ISBN 9025499147)
- Dier en engel (1996, novel, Contact, ISBN 905542398X)
- Salomo's dochter (2003, novel, Contact, ISBN 9025417663)
- De heiligwording van Berthe Ploos (2007, novel, Contact, ISBN 9789025426484)

=== As Justa Abbing ===
- Schoonheid, schoonheid (1997, ISBN 902542144X)
- Leraar leerling (1998, ISBN 9025424201)
- Kindje kindje (2000, ISBN 9025496571)
- Man en vader (2004, ISBN 9025425119)
