= Felix Thijssen =

Dutch author (1933–2022)

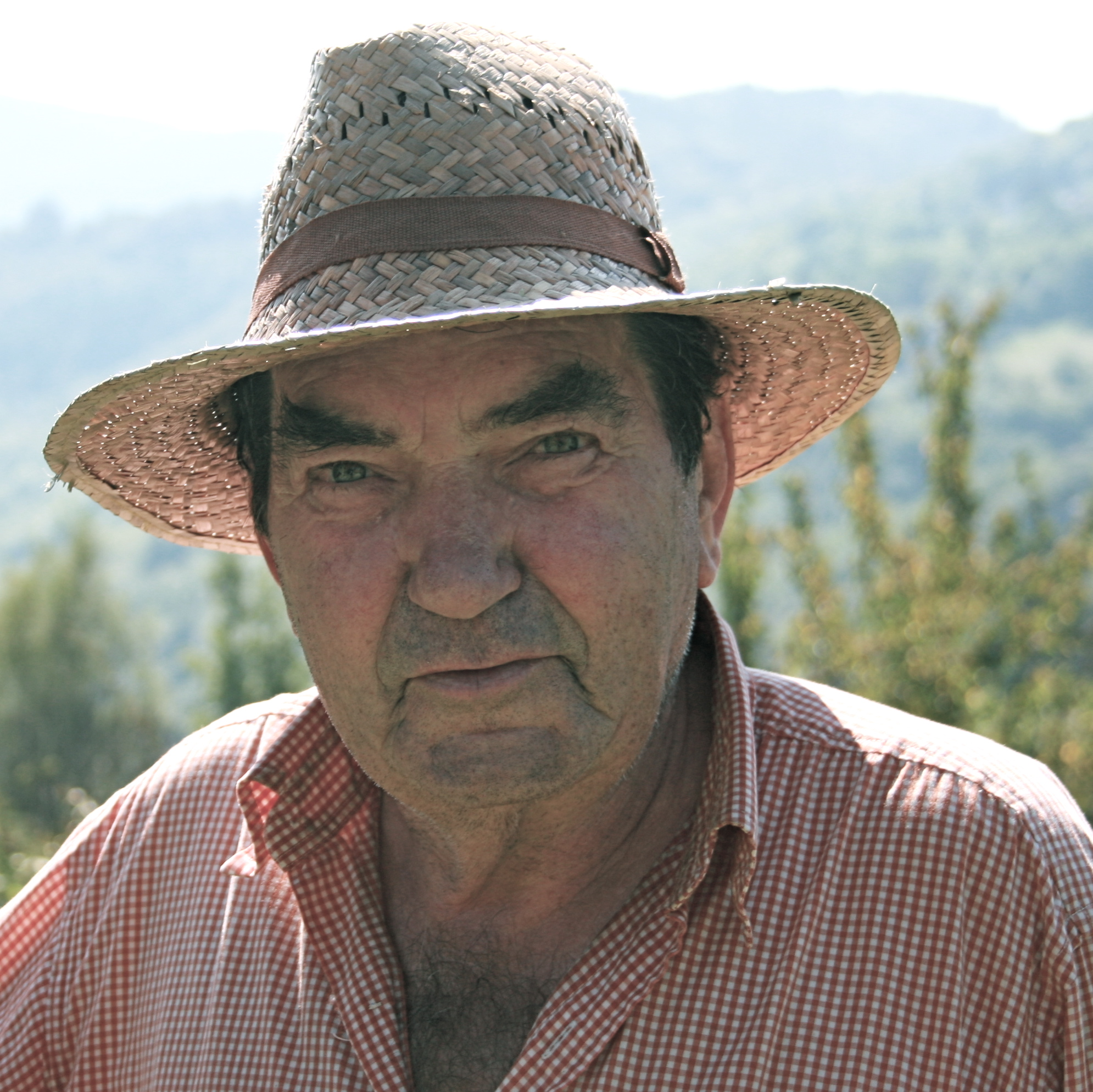
- Born: 24 November 1933; Rijswijk, Netherlands
- Died: 26 July 2022 (aged 88); Saint-Germain-de-Calberte, France
- Occupations: Novelist, screenwriter
- Writing career
- Genres: Crime, suspense, science-fiction

Felix Thijssen (24 November 1933 – 26 July 2022) was a Dutch author of crime novels, science fiction novels and books for children. In 1999 he won the "Gouden Strop", prize for the best Dutch crime novel, for "Cleopatra". In 2006 he won the "Diamanten Kogel", Belgian prize for the best crime novel, for "Het diepe water" (Deep water).

He lived in Saint-Germain-de-Calberte, France, where he died at the age of 88.
