= Boudewijn Koole =

Dutch film director

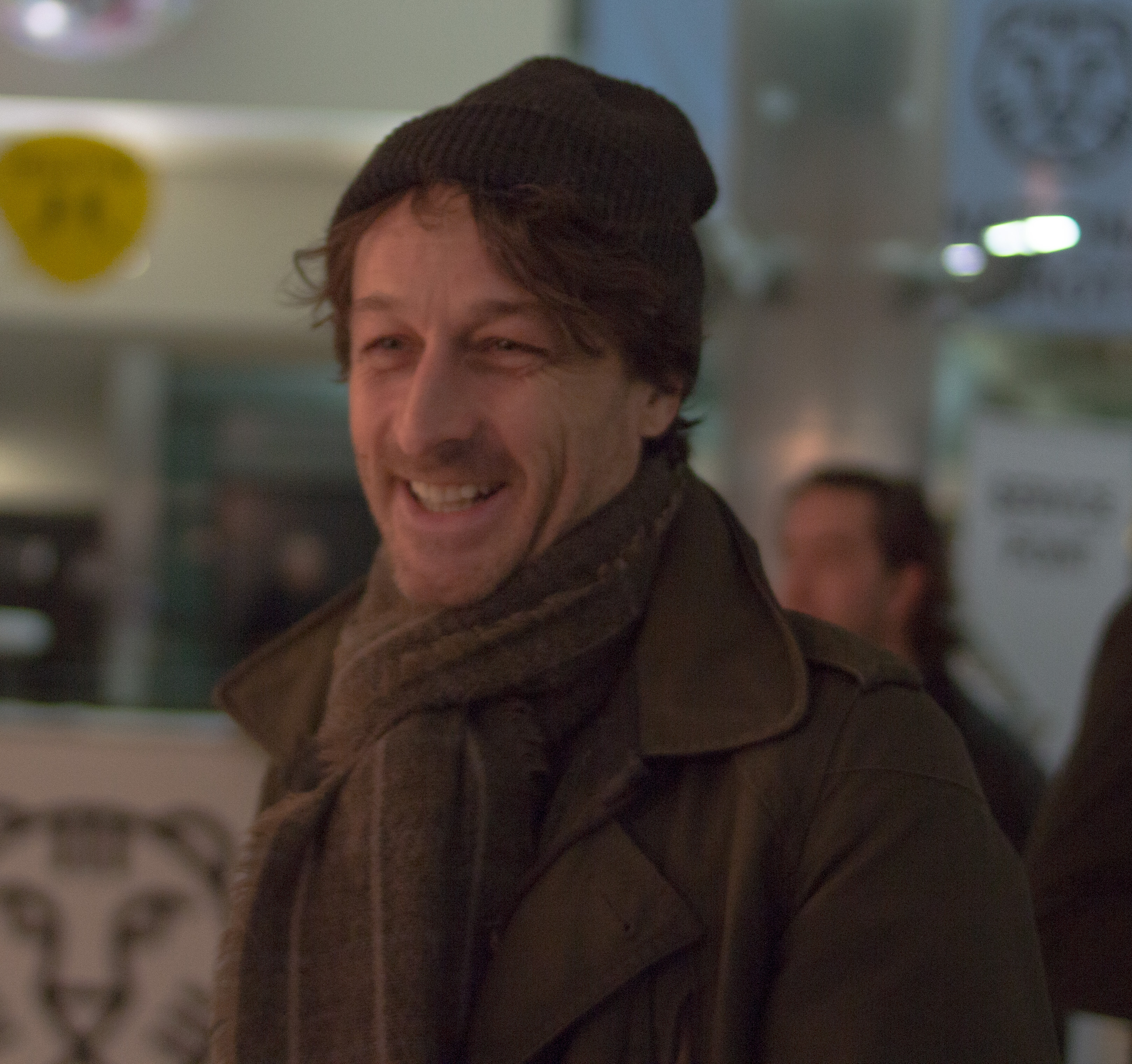
- Boudewijn Koole in 2017
- Born: 1965 (age 60–61)
- Occupation: Film director

Boudewijn Koole (born 1965) is a Dutch director and producer. He is mostly known for his drama film Kauwboy (2012).

Koole was born in Leiden in 1965 and spent his childhood in Nuenen, North Brabant. He studied at Delft University of Technology, where he earned a master’s degree in industrial design. As a self-taught filmmaker, he began his career making documentaries for the Dutch television program Villa Achterwerk, broadcast by the VPRO. Some of his most notable documentary works include Tommie (2000), In Belfast is a Wall (2001), Zooey (2004), and Gilliard (1996), which was nominated for an International Emmy Award.

After several years of producing and directing documentaries, Koole expanded his repertoire to include fiction films. In 2012, he made his fiction feature debut with Kauwboy, which was a national and international success, was selected as the Dutch entry for the Academy Awards, and won the Best First Feature Award at the Berlin International Film Festival. In 2016 he won the Dutch Award for Best Direction for Beyond Sleep (2016), and the following year his film Disappearance (2017) received the Cineuropa Award at the Les Arcs European Film Festival

The characters in his fiction films often explore existential and universal themes such as loss, fear, and death. In an interview with CineSud, Koole stated that he is particularly interested in the parent-child relationship and the interplay between what originates from the individual and what is shaped by the environment.

== Witfilm: Creative producer and Co-founder ==
Koole is a co-founder of Witfilm (2006), a production company dedicated to innovative, artistically driven films together with Iris Lammertsma. Witfilm focuses on creative, social, and youth documentaries, as well as arthouse films. Under Koole’s leadership as creative producer, Witfilm has produced and co-produced films that have been nominated for and won awards, including: - International Emmy Award (Arts Programming) for Dance or Die (2019)

- Best Doc at Prix Europa 2021 for Shadow Game (2021)

- Best Dutch Children's Film Award at CineKid for Liefjes (2024)

- Best Short Documentary at Dutch Academy awards for Mijn Vader, Nour en ik (2023)

- Best Documentary at IDFA for Dood in de Bijlmer (2020)

Besides his producing work Koole also coaches’ filmmakers, nationally and internationally, in writing and directing.

== Filmography (Selection) ==
=== Upcoming projects ===
Title	Type	Status	Director	Producer	Link
Tower Stories	Feature Film	Post-production	Peter Greenaway	Facing East Entertainment, Witfilm, Jumpy Cow Pictures, The Family.	https://www.imdb.com/title/tt7675204/
Meis	Feature Film	Development	Boudewijn Koole	Witfilm, Kärnfilm, Umedia.	https://www.imdb.com/title/tt40642675/?ref_=nm_flmg_job_1_accord_1_unrel_cdt_t_1

=== Feature Films ===
Year	Title	Function	Type	Awards/Notes
2024	Hokwerda’s Child	Writer, Director & Producer	Feature film, 124 min	Adaptation of the novel by Oek de Jong. Screenplay and direction. Witfilm.
2022	Modern Love Amsterdam	Writer & Director	TV series episode	Amazon Original series. Screenplay and direction. NL Film.
2017	Disappearance	Director	Feature film, 80 min	Cineuropa Prize (Les Arcs), Best Film (French jury).
2016	Beyond Sleep	Writer & Director	Feature film, 90 min	Dutch Academy Award for Best Direction, opening film IFF Rotterdam.
2012	Kauwboy	Writer & Director	Feature film, 80 min	First Feature Award (Berlinale), European Discovery Award, numerous international awards.

=== Documentaries ===
Year	Title	Type	Function	Awards/Notes
2019	Dance or Die	Documentary	Creative Producer	International Emmy Award (Arts Programming), Nomination Golden Rose Award
2002	Delusion	Documentary	Camera & Direction	On the necessity of imagination in schizophrenic patients.
2001	There is a Wall in Belfast	Documentary	Camera & Direction	Runner-up Golden Gate Festival San Francisco.
1996	Gilliard	Documentary	Direction	Runner up for the International Emmy Award.

== Awards and Nominations (Selection) ==
Jaar	Prijs	Festival	Film	Uitslag
2017	Audience Award	European Film Festival of Lecce	Disappearance	won
2017	Special Jury Award	European Film Festival of Lecce	Disappearance	won
2017	Award for special contribution for the northern cinema	Noordelijk Film Festival	Disappearance	won
2017	Cineuropa Award- best film by French Film Critics	Film Festival Les Arcs	Disappearance	won
2017	Screened	Film festival Toronto	Disappearance	selected
2016	Opening film	Rotterdam Film Festival	Beyond Sleep	selected
2016	Best Director	Dutch directors guild	Beyond Sleep	nominated
2016	Best Director	Dutch academy awards	Beyond Sleep	won
2013	Best short dance film- Audience Award	Cinedans	Off Ground	won
2013	Golden Calf	Dutch academy awards	Off Ground	nominated
2012	Award for best Youth Film	Berlinale	Kauwboy	won
2012	Best First Feature Award	Berlinale	Kauwboy	won
2012	Grand Prix of the Deutsches Kinderhilfswerk	Berlinale	Kauwboy	won
2012	European Discovery - Prix Fipresci	European Film Awards	Kauwboy	won
2012	Young audience award	European Film Awards	Kauwboy	won
2014	Golden Calf	Best Editing	Happily Ever After	won
2007	Golden Calf	Best television drama	Drawn Out Love	nominated
