= Ethel Portnoy =

Dutch writer

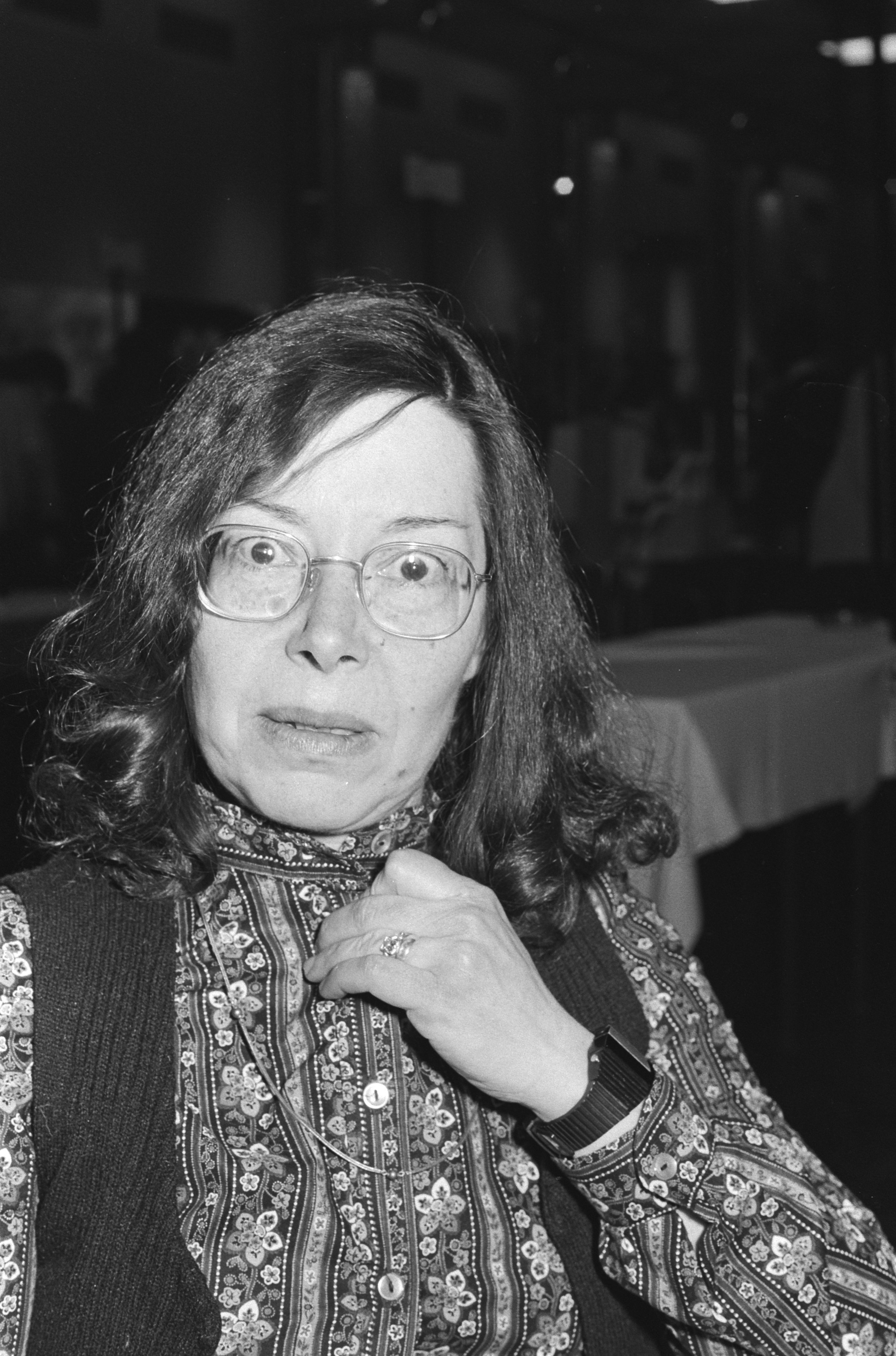
- Ethel Portnoy in 1979
- Born: Ethel Portnoy; 8 March 1927; Philadelphia, United States
- Died: 25 May 2004 (aged 77); The Hague, Netherlands
- Occupation: Author
- Writing career
- Genres: Essay, Short Story, Novel

Ethel Portnoy (March 8, 1927 – May 25, 2004) was a Dutch writer of prose, who wrote essays, columns, short stories, travel stories and several novels.

== Biography ==
Ethel Portnoy was born in Philadelphia but grew up in the Bronx in New York City as the daughter of Russian-Jewish immigrants. She took classes in English literature in New York City and learned French in the United States, then departed to Europe in 1950 with a Fulbright for the University of Lyon. She also studied cultural anthropology and archeology in Paris, with Claude Lévi-Strauss amongst others. She married Dutch author Rudy Kousbroek (1929–2010) in 1951. She raised two children and until 1962 she worked at the UNESCO. She worked for Dutch papers and was published in Randstad, in the weeklies Haagse Post and Vrij Nederland and also in the NRC Handelsblad. The family moved to The Hague in 1970. In 1978 Portnoy and Hannemieke Stamperius founded the feminist literary journal Chrysallis. Since 1979, she worked at the journal Maatstaf.

Portnoy debuted as a novelist in 1971 at the age of 44 with the book Steen en Been. She wrote in English, but considered herself a Dutch writer. Her books were translated by her (ex-)husband (they were divorced in the 1980s), their daughter Hepzibah Kousbroek (1954–2009) and by Tinke Davids.

== Works ==
Most of her books were published by Amsterdam publisher Meulenhoff.

- 1971 - Steen en been en andere verhalen. Meulenhoff.
- 1974 - De brandende bruid. Meulenhoff
- 1978 - Broodje Aap. De folklore van de post-industriële samenleving. De Harmonie, Amsterdam (urban legends)
- 1978 - Belle van Zuylen ontmoet Cagliostro: Een toneelstuk in twee bedrijven. Meulenhoff
- 1981 - Het ontwaken van de zee. Meulenhoff
- 1983 - Vliegende vellen: Schetsen en verhalen. Meulenhoff
- 1984 - Amourettes en andere verhalen. Knippenberg
- 1984 - Vluchten: Reisverhalen. Meulenhoff
- 1985 - Een hondeleven. Arbeiderspers, Amsterdam
- 1986 - De geklede mens. Cantecleer
- 1986 - De lifter en andere verhalen. Anthos
- 1987 - Dromomania. Stiefkinderen van de cultuur: Essays. Meulenhoff
- 1989 - Opstandige vrouwen. Meulenhoff
- 1990 - Rook over Rusland: Reisverhaal. Meulenhoff
- 1991 - De eerste zoen. Meulenhoff.
- 1992 - Europese kusten: Fotografische impressies. Martin Kers, photography. Inmerc
- 1992 - Gemengde gevoelens. Meulenhoff
- 1992 - Madonna's appel: Over vrouwen en de media. Meulenhoff
- 1992 - Broodje aap met: Een verdere bijdrage tot de folklore van de post-industriele samanleving. Harmonie.
- 1993 - Altijd zomer. Meulenhoff
- 1994 - Overal thuis: Reisverhalen. Meulenhoff
- 1996 - Bange mensen: Een Haagse vertelling. Meulenhoff
- 1998 - Genietingen: Essays.Meulenhoff
- 2000 - Zielespijs en wat verder ter tafel komt: Essays. Meulenhoff
- 2003 - Portret. Meulenhoff (memoirs)
- 2004 - Parijse feesten. Meulenhoff
- 2004 - Vijf onbekende zaken van Sherlock Holmes. De Harmonie

== Trivia ==
The Dutch language is using the term "Broodje Aap" ('monkey sandwich') to refer to urban legends as a result of Portnoy's book with the same title.

== Literature ==
- Doeschka Meijsing: Ethel Portnoy: Informatie. Meulenhoff, Amsterdam 1984
- Lydia Lippens: Ethel Portnoy: Een bibliografie. Lippens, 1986
