= The House of the Mosque =

Novel by Kader Abdolah

The House of the Mosque (Dutch: Het huis van de moskee) is a Dutch-language novel by Iranian writer Kader Abdolah, published in 2005. The English language translation of The House of the Mosque was published in January 2010.

== Plot ==
The book follows the life of an Iranian family from 1969 on through the regime of Shah Mohammad Reza Pahlavi, the Iranian revolution of 1979 and the installment of the Khomeini government, and ends after Khomeini's death. The story is a "semi-mythical narrative ... bearing a 'flying carpet' element of fantasy" that is countered by the horrifying events that the protagonists face as the revolution progresses.

Most of the plot takes place in a large (36-room) house attached to the Friday mosque in Senejan, three hours by train from Qom, a fictionalized version of Senjan, now a district of Arak, Iran. Kader Abdolah was born and grew up in a similar house in that city. In the presentation of real historical events, many names and locations are altered, so that the novel does not pretend to be an accurate description of the historical situation. The main character is Aqa Jaan ("Dear Master", a title often given to the male head of a household in Iran). Shahbal, the son of his blind cousin who is the muezzin of the mosque, personifies the author (Shahbal is called the "narrator" of the story in the cast of characters). Like Shahbal, Kader Abdolah was active in leftist underground political movements in the time of the Shah and of Khomeini, and fled Iran in 1985 to settle in the Netherlands. Unlike Shahbal, the author did not kill anyone, but instead avenged the murders of his brother and sister with his pen. For example, before fleeing Iran, Shahbal killed Khalkhal, a fictionalized version of Khomeini's "hanging judge" Sadeq Khalkhali, but the real Khakhali died of old age in 2003.

== Main themes ==
The House of the Mosque primarily explores the lifestyle of a traditional, extended Iranian family and how they coped with the changes brought by the Westernization of Iran until 1979, the revolution and the subsequent radicalization. Additionally, the book portrays struggles between the leaders of the bazaar and the religious rule of the imams—and between family members who are traditionalists and those who are caught up in revolutionary ideas and do not follow the old rules of the house.

== Main characters ==
- Aqa Jaan - head of the bazaar and head of the family, works in the carpet business
- Fakhri Sadat - wife of Aqa Jaan
- Jawad, Nasrin and Ensi - son and daughters of Aqa Jaan and Fakhri Sadat
- Alsaberi - the imam of the Senejan mosque; Aqa Jaan's cousin
- Zinat -wife of Alsaberi, who radicalizes and becomes head of the morality police after the revolution
- Ahmad - son of Alsaberi and Zinat, successor of his father as imam of the mosque
- Sadiq - Alsaberi and Zinat's eldest daughter
- Khalkhal - husband of Sadiq, also imam, a close ally of Ayatollah Khomeini, and the judge of Allah later in the book
- Lizard - Sadiq and Khalkhal's deformed son
- Aqa Shoja / Muezzin - the mosque's blind muezzin; potter by profession; Aqa Jaan and Alsaberi's cousin
- Shahbal - son of Muezzin; spiritual son of Aqa Jaan
- Golebeh and Golbanu - the "grandmothers" who run the house, where they have lived for over 40 years
- Nosrat - Aqa Jaan's younger brother who left the house for city life
- Kazem Khan - poet; uncle of Aqa Jaan

== Awards ==
- Grinzane Cavour Prize, 2009

== See also ==
- NRC's Best Dutch novels
