= Gouden Strop =

Dutch literary award

The Gouden Strop (i.e. 'Golden Noose') is the annual award for the best crime novel in the Dutch language. The prize has been awarded since 1986. The winner receives € 10,000 and a statuette. Its Belgian equivalent is the Diamanten Kogel (i.e. 'Diamond Bullet').

== List of winners ==
- 2025: De prijs, Marcel van de Ven & Willem Asman
- 2024: De duiker, Mathijs Deen
- 2023: Musserts Schaduw, John Kuipers
- 2022: Vogeleiland, Marion Pauw
- 2021 : Bloedsteen, Bernice Berkleef
- 2020 : Russisch voor beginners, Dominique Biebau
- 2019 : De witte kamer, Samantha Stroombergen
- 2018 : Enter, Willem Asman
- 2017 : Tot stof, Felix Weber
- 2016 : Lieve mama, Esther Verhoef
- 2015 : De mythe van Methusalem, Jo Claes
- 2014 : Versleuteld, Donald Nolet
- 2013: Nacht in Parijs, Michael Berg
- 2012: Een zomer zonder slaap, Bram Dehouck
- 2011: De handen van Kalman Teller, Gauke Andriesse
- 2010: De minzame moordenaar, Bram Dehouck
- 2009: Daglicht, Marion Pauw
- 2008 : Cel, Charles den Tex
- 2007 : De tiende vrouw, Roel Janssen
- 2006 : De macht van meneer Miller, Charles den Tex
- 2005 : Dood van een soldaat, Johanna Spaey
- 2004 : Groene vrijdag, Elvin Post
- 2003 : De zesde mei, Tomas Ross
- 2002 : Schijn van kans, Charles den Tex
- 2001 : Zinloos geweld, René Appel
- 2000 : Het Alibibureau, Peter de Zwaan
- 1999 : Cleopatra, Felix Thijssen
- 1998 : Fotofinish, Jac. Toes
- 1997 : De kracht van het vuur, Bob Mendes
- 1996 : Koerier voor Sarajevo, Tomas Ross
- 1995 : Vertraging, Tim Krabbé
- 1994 : Het woeden der gehele wereld, Maarten 't Hart
- 1993 : Vergelding, Bob Mendes
- 1992 : Playback, Chris Rippen
- 1991 : De derde persoon, René Appel
- 1990 : not awarded
- 1989 : De terugkeer van Sid Stefan, Gerben Hellinga
- 1988 : not awarded
- 1987 : Bèta, Tomas Ross
- 1986 : De zaak Alzheimer, Jef Geeraerts
