= Paranoia (Hermans book) =

- First edition
- Author: Willem Frederik Hermans
- Language: Dutch
- Publisher: G. A. van Oorschot
- Publication date: 1953
- Publication place: Netherlands
- Pages: 194

Paranoia is a 1953 short story collection by the Dutch writer Willem Frederik Hermans. The titular story was adapted into the 1967 film Paranoia, directed by Adriaan Ditvoorst, and into a play written and directed by Inge-Vera Lipsius, performed on location at The Merchant House, Amsterdam, in October 2022/23.

== Contents ==
- Preambule
- Manuscript in een kliniek gevonden
- Paranoia
- Het behouden huis
- Glas
- Lotti Fuehrscheim

== See also ==
- 1953 in literature
- Dutch literature
