= Charles den Tex =

Dutch writer (born 1952)

Den Tex coat of arms

Charles den Tex (born 21 April 1952) is a Dutch writer.

== Early life ==
Charles den Tex was born in Camberwell, Australia. His parents returned with him to the Netherlands when he was 6.

== Career ==
Den Tex studied Photography and Cinematography in London, then worked as an English teacher in Paris. He also worked as a copywriter in an advertising agency in Amsterdam. In 1980, he began working as communication consultant.

== Writing ==
Charles den Tex published his first crime novel, Dump, in 1995. As of 2011 he has written 10 crime novels, two short stories and a dictionary on the jargon of management and consultancy. Seven of his novels have been nominated to Gouden Strop Prize and has received the prize for three.

== Bibliography ==
- Dump (1995)
- Claim (1996, filmed in 2001 by Martin Lagestee, starring Billy Zane and Louise Lombard)
- Code 39 (1998)
- Deal (1999)
- Van Aai-instrument tot Zwaluwstaarten
- Schijn van kans (2002, winner of the Gouden Strop)
- Stegger (2003)
- Angstval (2004)
- De macht van meneer Miller (2005, winner of the Gouden Strop).
- Cel (2008, winnaar Gouden Strop).
- Verdwijning (2008, for people with reading difficultues).
- Spijt (2009)
- Wachtwoord (2010)
- Onmacht
- De Vriend (2012)
- De erfgenaam (2013)
- Ik ben koopman. Kroniek van de familie Fentener van Vlissingen (2013)
- Het vergeten verhaal van een onwankelbare liefde in oorlogstijd (met Anneloes Timmerije) (2014)
- Bot (2016)
- Verloren Vrouw (2019)

He translated plays (Onze jeugd in 2003, Tape in 2005, Democraten in 2005 en Succes in 2006) and wrote the play Volmaakt Geluk (2008), That's Showbizz, Baby! (2010) and Blind Vertrouwen (2011).
