= Kader Abdolah =

Iranian-Dutch writer, poet and columnist

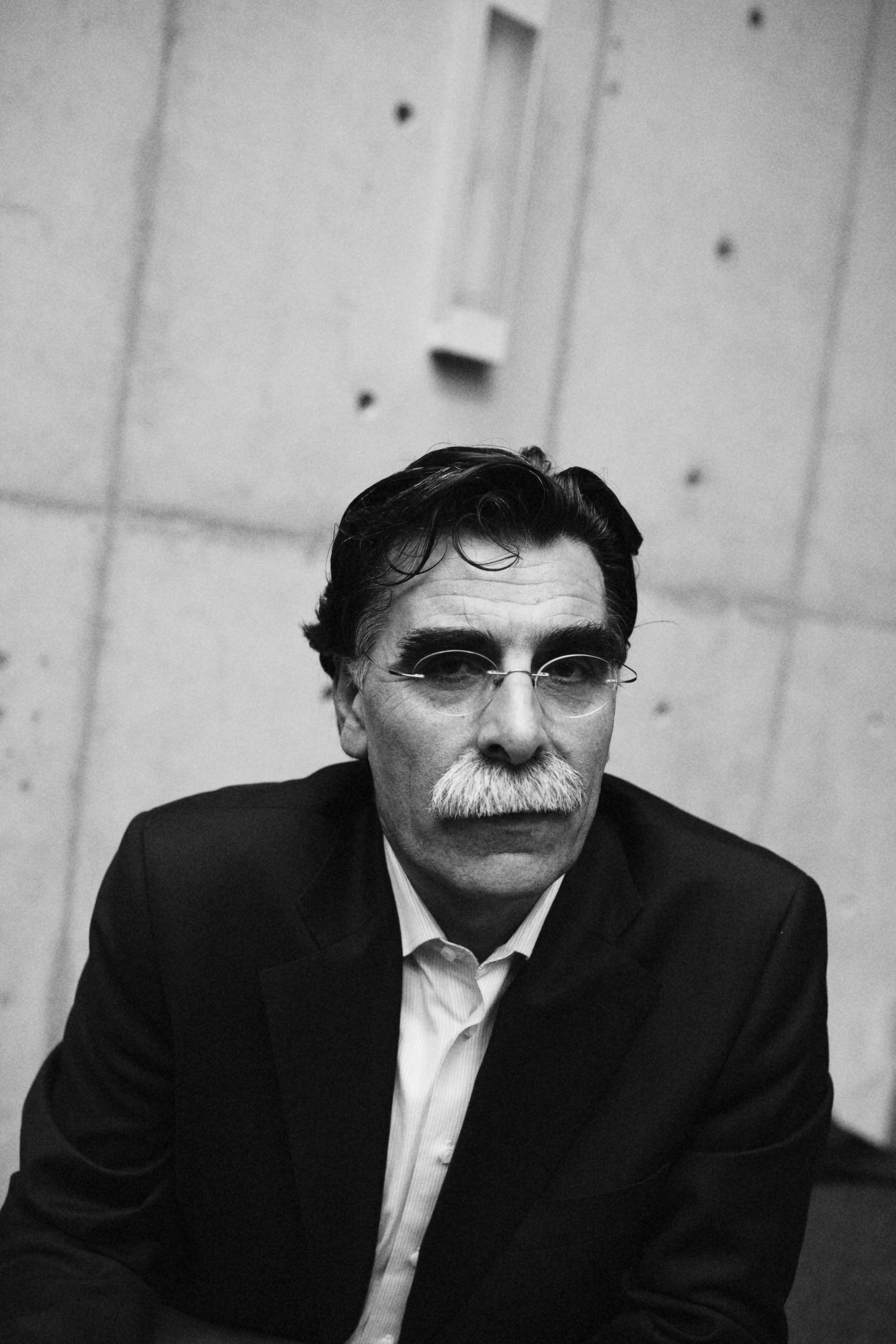
- Kader Abdolah in October 2008
- Born: Hossein Sadjadi Ghaemmaghami Farahani; Arak, Markazi Province, Iran
- Citizenship: Netherlands; Iran
- Education: University of Teheran
- Writing career
- Pen name: Kader Abdolah
- Language: Dutch, Persian

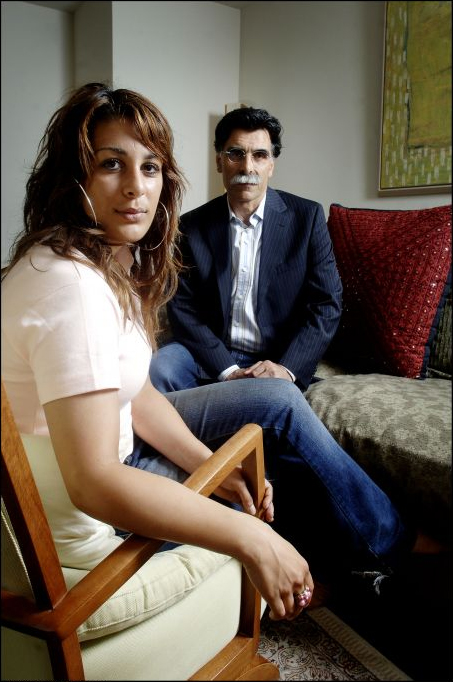
Kader Abdolah and his daughter Bahar Abdolah.

Hossein Sadjadi Ghaemmaghami Farahani (Persian: حسین سجادی قائم‌مقامی فراهانی), better known by his pen name Kader Abdolah (Persian: قادر عبدالله) (Arak, 12 November 1954), is an Iranian-Dutch writer, poet and columnist. His books, written in Dutch, often contain Persian literary themes. He regularly appears on Dutch television as well.

== Life ==
Kader Abdolah is one of the descendants of Mirza Abu'l-Qasem Qa'em-Maqam, the Iranian politician during the Qajar period who was also affiliated with art and literature.

Kader Abdolah had long wished to become an author. He used his political passion to begin his career after the Islamic revolution in 1979 by writing articles in the leftist political newspapers.

In the 1980s, he wrote two novels which were published illegally because of the political constraints: What are the Kurds saying? and Kurdistan after the resistance party.

When he immigrated to the Netherlands, he felt as if political issues were no longer relevant to his life and he fell into a state of depression because he had thought of political activities as the essence of his life. Learning Dutch and to write in the language is therefore described by him as a political tool for fighting. Literature had turned into the incentive for a new fight.

== Career ==
Kader Abdolah studied physics in Arak College of Science (today's Arak University [although the Dutch and French articles say a different school]) in Arak, Iran, and graduated in 1977. After graduation he served his mandatory military service in the Iranian Navy in Bandar Pahlavi (today's Bandar-e-Anzali). During the revolution, he joined the left-wing movement opposing the Shah—and later the Khomeini—regimes. He fled to the Netherlands as a political refugee in 1988. In 2006, he was writer in residence at Leiden University. Today [when?] he lives in Delft, writing under a pseudonym composed of the names of two executed friends.

Het huis van de moskee (The House of the Mosque) catapulted Abdolah onto the Dutch bestseller lists. In 2007 it was voted second best Dutch novel ever in the Netherlands in an online survey organized by NRC Handelsblad and NPS. The English translation was released worldwide in January 2010.

== Works/Publications ==
- 1993 – De adelaars
- 1995 – De meisjes en de partizanen
- 1997 – De reis van de lege flessen
- 1998 – Is dit mijn recht, mijn lief?
- 1998 – Buitenspiegels: verhalen over Nederland
- 1998 – Mirza
- 1998 – Short Shorties
- Kader, Abdolah (1999). El viaje de las botellas vacias. Galaxia Gutenberg/Circulo de Lectores.
- 1999 – Les jeunes filles et les partisans
- Kader, Abdolah (2000). My Father's Notebook: A Novel of Iran. p. 336. ISBN 978-0-060-59872-3.
- 2001 – De koffer
- Abdolah, Kader (2001). Il viaggio delle bottiglie vuote. Iperborea. ISBN 978-8-870-91096-4
- 2001 – Een tuin in zee
- Abdolah, Kader. Scrittura cuneiforme. Iperborea. ISBN 978-8-870-91118-3
- 2001 – Andere ogen: Een frisse blik op Nederland in verhalen
- 2002 – Kélilé en Demné
- 2002 – Sophia's droë vrugte
- 2003 – Portretten en een oude droom
- 2003 – Karavaan
- 2005 - Het huis van de moskee (The House of the Mosque)
- 2006 – II viaggio delle botiglie vuote
- Kader, Abdolah (2006). El reflejo de las palabras. SALAMANDRA. ISBN 978-8-498-38034-7
- 2007 – Voetstappen
- 2008 – De boodschapper: een vertelling / de Koran: een vertaling. A two volume set: De boodschapper: een vertelling ('The Messenger: a narration') about the life of the prophet Muhammad, and de Koran: een vertaling ('The Qur'an: a translation'), Abdolah's Dutch translation of the Qur'an
- Abdolah, Kader (2009). DZAMIJSKA KUCA. Dereta – Beograd.
- 2010 – Mohammad, der Prophet
- Abdolah, Kader (2010). Ritratti e un vecchio sogno (Narrativa). Iperborea.
- Abdolah, Kader (2011). Calila e Dimna (Narrativa). Iperborea.
- 2011 – De koning
- 2011 – De kraai
- 2012 – IL re
- 2012 – How Europe is changing ISBN 978-0-615-46655-2
- Kader, Abdolah (2013). Il corvo. Iperborea. ISBN 978-8-870-91522-8
- 2014 – Papegaai vloog over de IJssel
- Kader, Abdolah (2014). The King: A Novel. Librairie Klincksieck. p. 401.
- 2016 – Messenger, The: A Tale Retold
- 2016 – Salam Europa!
- Abdolah, Kader (2016). Un pappagallo volò sull'IJssel (Narrativa). Iperborea.
- Kader, Abdolah (2016). A parrot flew over the Ijssel. Iperborea. ISBN 978-8-870-91466-5
- 2016 – Qur'an the ISBN 978-9-462-38023-3
- 2018 – Het pad van de gele slippers
- Kader, Abdolah (2018). Uno scià alla corte d'Europa. Iperborea. ISBN 978-8-870-91494-8
- Kader, Abdolah (2018). Le Messager. Editions Gallimard.
- 2020 – The House of the Mosque ISBN 978-1-847-67240-7
- Kader, Abdolah (2022). Il faraone d'Olanda (Narrativa). Iperborea.
- 2024 - Zarathustra spreekt
- 2025 - Ze vliegen nog altijd over de Schie ISBN 9789044659641

== Honours and awards ==
- Best selling debut of 1993 for his book De adelaars(Eagles).
- Dutch Media Prize, 1997 for his book Mirza
- E. du Perronprijs of 2000 for his novel Spijkerschrift.
- Knight in the Order of the Netherlands Lion (Dutch: Ridder in de Orde van de Nederlandse Leeuw) in 2000.
- Knight in the French Order of Arts and Literature (French: Chevalier dans l'Ordre des Arts et des Lettres) in 2008.
- Honorary doctor at the University of Groningen in 2009.
- Invitation to write the 2011 Boekenweekgeschenk, a gift (De Kraai) to buyers of Dutch books during the Boekenweek.
