= Friedrich Weinreb =

Dutch writer (1910–1988)

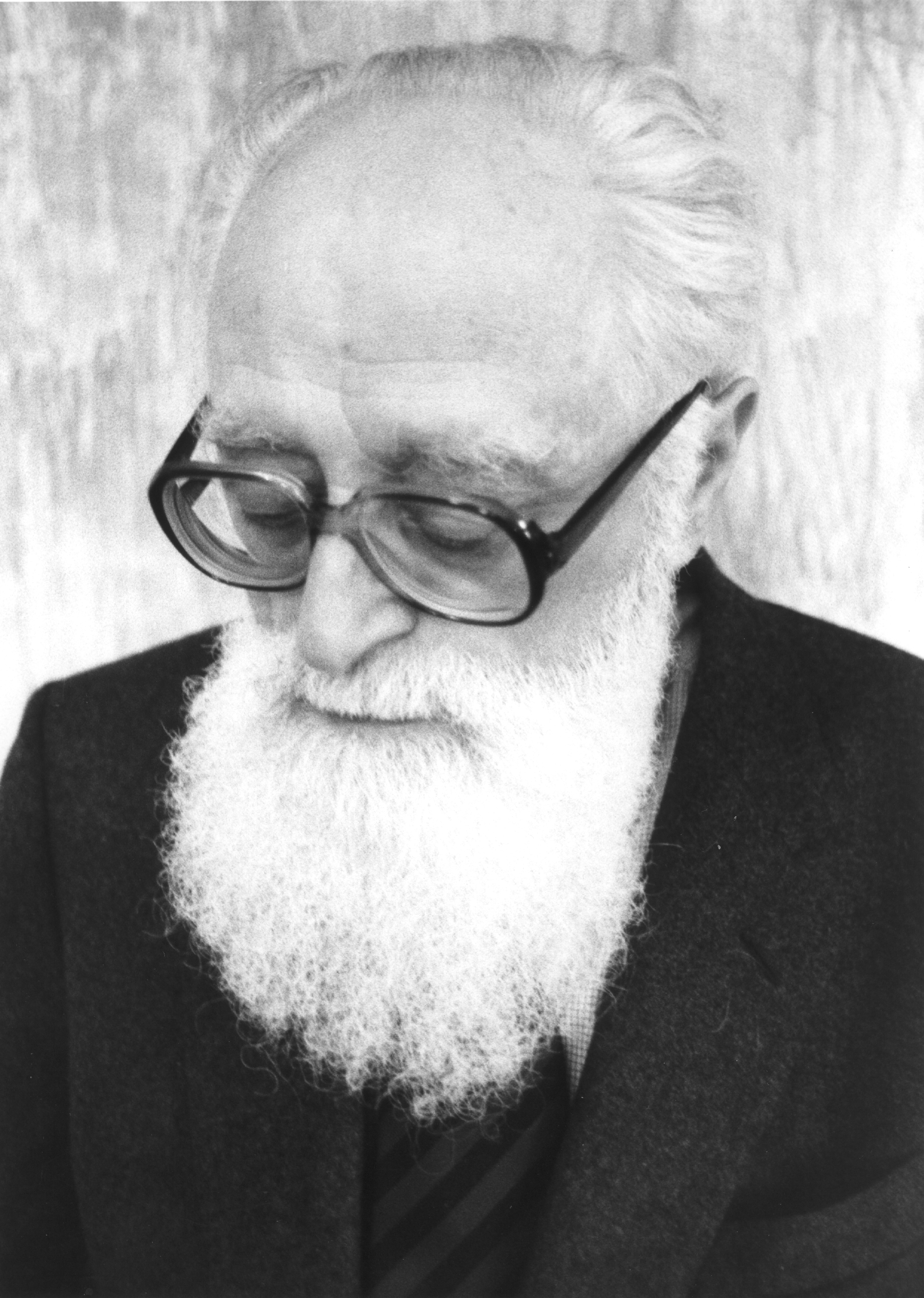
- Friedrich Weinreb
- Born: 18 November 1910; Lemberg, Galicia, Austria-Hungary
- Died: 19 October 1988 (aged 77); Zürich, Switzerland

Friedrich Weinreb (18 November 1910 – 19 October 1988) was a Dutch economist and narrative author.

Weinreb grew up in Scheveningen, Netherlands, to which his family had moved in 1916, and became notorious for selling a fictitious escape route for Jews from the occupied Netherlands in the Second World War. When his scheme fell apart in 1944, he left his home in Scheveningen and went into hiding in Ede. He was imprisoned for 3½ years after the war for fraud as well as collaboration with the German occupier. In his memoirs, published in 1969, he maintained that his plans were to give Jews hope for survival and that he had assumed that the liberation of the Netherlands would take place before his customers were deported. The debate about his guilt or innocence—called the “Weinreb affair”—was very heated in the Netherlands in the 1970s, involving noted writers, like Renate Rubinstein and Willem Frederik Hermans. In an attempt to end this debate, the government asked the Rijksinstituut voor Oorlogsdocumentatie (Netherlands Institute for War Documentation) to investigate the matter. In 1976 the institute issued a report (a part of which had already been leaked to the press in 1973), which determined that his memoirs were "a collection of lies and fantasies," and that his collaboration had caused 70 deaths. Although his activities did contribute to some Jews' survival, most Jews who fell for Weinreb's swindle were deported and killed.

In 1957 and 1968 Weinreb was convicted for posing as a medical doctor and for sexual offenses. To avoid imprisonment, Weinreb left the Netherlands in 1968, after which he emigrated to Switzerland.

Even after his death in 1988 the discussion about Weinreb in the Netherlands has not come to an end. In a Dutch biography by Regina Grüter published in 1997, Een fantast schrijft geschiedenis, Weinreb was depicted as a sufferer from Pseudologia fantastica.

== Bibliography ==
Weinreb's writings entail more than 50 titles. The following list offers only a selection.

- Schöpfung im Wort. Die Struktur der Bibel in jüdischer Überlieferung. ISBN 3-88411-028-4 ()
- Buchstaben des Lebens. Erzählt nach jüdischer Überlieferung. ISBN 3-88411-038-1 ()
- Zahl, Zeichen, Wort. Das symbolische Universum der Bibelsprache. ISBN 3-88411-031-4 ()
- Das jüdische Passahmahl und was dabei von der Erlösung erzählt wird. ISBN 3-88411-026-8 ()
- Die Astrologie in der jüdischen Mystik. ISBN 3-88411-012-8 ()
- Kabbala im Traumleben des Menschen. ISBN 3-424-01161-4 ()
- Innenwelt des Wortes im Neuen Testament. Eine Deutung aus den Quellen des Judentums. ISBN 3-88411-034-9 ()
- Die langen Schatten des Krieges (Autobiografie, 1989, 3 Bände). ISBN 3-88411-035-7 ()
