= Kauwboy =

2012 film

- Film poster
- Directed by: Boudewijn Koole
- Written by: Jolein Laarman; Boudewijn Koole
- Produced by: Jan van der Zanden
- Starring: Rick Lens; Loek Peters; Susan Radder; Ricky Koole
- Cinematography: Daniël Bouquet
- Edited by: Gys Zevenbergen
- Music by: Helge Slikker
- Production company: The Film Kitchen
- Distributed by: Benelux Film Distributors
- Release dates: 11 February 2012 (Berlin); 7 April 2012 (Netherlands)
- Running time: 81 minutes
- Country: Netherlands
- Language: Dutch

Kauwboy is a 2012 Dutch drama film directed by Boudewijn Koole. The film was selected as the Dutch entry for the Best Foreign Language Oscar at the 85th Academy Awards, but it did not make the final shortlist.

== Cast ==
- Rick Lens as Jojo
- Loek Peters as Ronald
- Cahit Ölmez as Deniz
- Susan Radder as Yenthe
- Ricky Koole as July

== Awards ==
- Golden Elephant Award - 18th International Children's Film Festival held at Hyderabad, India in 2013
- Grand Prix of the Deutsches Kinderhilfswerk - Berlin International Film Festival (Berlinale) 2012
- Best Music - Dutch Film Festival 2012
- Critics Choice - Dutch Film Festival 2012
- European Discovery 2012 - European Film Awards 2012
- Rick Lens nominated as Best Young Actor in an International Feature Film - Young Artist Awards 2013

== See also ==
- List of submissions to the 85th Academy Awards for Best Foreign Language Film
- List of Dutch submissions for the Academy Award for Best Foreign Language Film
