= The Evenings =

Debut novel by Gerard Reve

- First edition cover
- Author: Gerard Reve (Simon van het Reve)
- Original title: De avonden
- Language: Dutch
- Set in: Amsterdam, 22–31 December 1946
- Publisher: De Bezige Bij
- Publication date: November 1947
- Publication place: Netherlands
- Media type: Print
- ISBN: 978-90-234-5573-8
- OCLC: 35952069
- Dewey Decimal: 839.3
- LC Class: PT5881.28.E9 A95 1972

The Evenings: A Winter's Tale (Dutch: De avonden: Een winterverhaal) is the debut novel of the Dutch author Gerard Reve. It was released in November 1947 under the pseudonym "Simon van het Reve".

The novel describes ten evenings out of the life of the 23-year-old office clerk Frits van Egters living in Amsterdam. It is partitioned into ten chapters, of which each describes an evening between 22 and 31 December 1946. The novel was written very shortly after World War II. Though the war itself is hardly mentioned, the story gives, by describing an individual's experiences, a detailed description of contemporary post-war society which was marked by fear, boredom and loneliness.

== Reception and accolades ==
Upon its original release, the book shocked the critics and received mixed reviews. Godfried Bomans in Elsevier magazine described the novel as "grim, cynical and totally negative". Simon Vestdijk, on the other hand, praised the novel's grotesque humour.

In the 1950s, the novel remained popular in the Netherlands, especially among adolescents who easily identified with the main character. In a 2002 poll, members of the Society for Dutch Literature ranked De avonden first among works since 1900 in the Dutch canon. In 2007, De avonden was named as one of the Top 10 Dutch language novels of all time by readers of the newspaper NRC Handelsblad.

== International release ==
The book was released as Die Abende in Germany in 1987, Les soirs in France in 1989, Az esték in Hungary in 1999, Večery in Slovakia and Kvällarna in Sweden in 2008, and Las noches in Spain in 2011. The novel was translated into English only in 2016, by Sam Garrett.

== Adaptations ==
- In 1989, a film adaptation of the book was released, directed by Rudolf van den Berg.
- In November 1991, Dutch radio VPRO broadcast a 10-hour reading of the novel by Gerard Reve. The program has been subsequently released on CDs as an audiobook.
- The book has been adapted into a play by Joachim von Burchard in Germany in 1993, and Léon van der Sanden in 1996 and 2010.
- The novel was also adapted into a comic story by Dick Matena, first published in newspaper Het Parool in 2001, and then released as a series of books in 2003 and 2004. Matena has won the Bronzen Adhemar prize for his adaptation.
