= Bob Mendes =

Belgian accountant and writer (1928–2021)

David Mendes (15 May 1928 – 1 October 2021), who used the pseudonym Bob Mendes, was a Belgian accountant and writer of detective stories. He was born in Schoten, graduated in accountancy, fiscal duties and business administration and started his professional career as an accountant.

He made his literary debut in 1984, with the publication of a collection of poems Met rook geschreven (E: Written with smoke), followed by Alfa en Omega (Alpha and Omega).

== Bibliography ==
- De kracht van het bloed
- Meester in misdaad
- Stukken van mensen
- Spannende Verhalen
- Medeschuldig
- De beste misdaadverhalen uit Vlaanderen
- Bloedrecht
- Dirty Dancing
- De smaak van vrijheid
- Verslag aan de Koning
- De kracht van het ijs
- Misdaad en meesterschap
- De kracht van het vuur
- Meedogenloos
- Link
- Rassen/Rellen
- Vergelding
- De fraudejagers
- De vierde soera
- Het chunnelsyndroom
- Twee Misdaadromans
- Een dag van schaamte
- Alfa en Omega
- Bestemming Terreur
- Met rook geschreven

== See also ==
- Flemish literature

== Sources ==
- Bob Mendes (Official website)
- Bob Mendes (in Dutch)
- Genootschap Van Vlaamse Misdaadauteurs (in Dutch)
