= Willem Frederik Hermans =

Dutch writer (1921–1995)

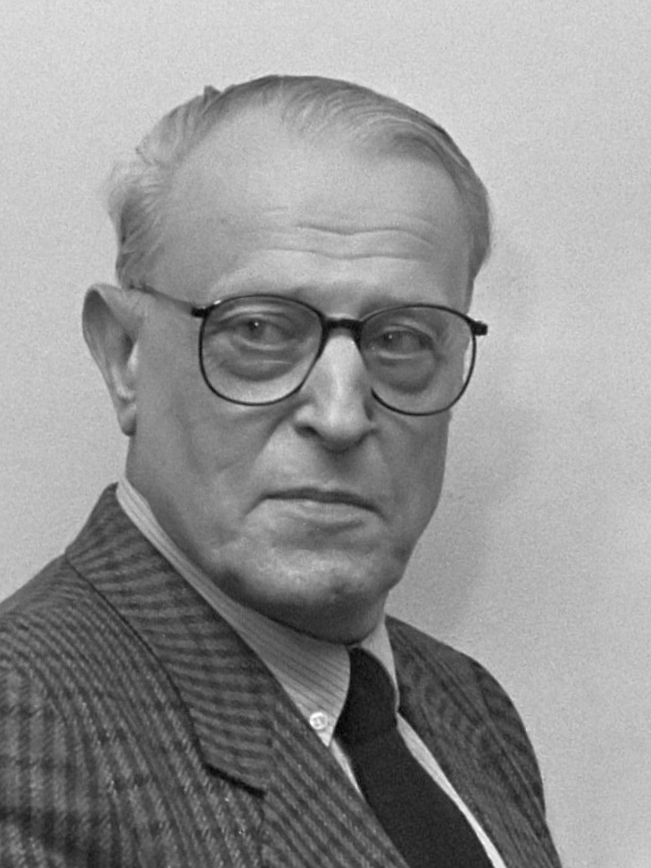
- W. F. Hermans in 1986
- Born: 1 September 1921; Amsterdam, Netherlands
- Died: 27 April 1995 (aged 73); Utrecht, Netherlands
- Occupations: Physical geographer, writer
- Spouse(s): Emmy Meurs (1950–95)
- Writing career
- Period: 1940–1995
- Genres: Poetry, novels, short stories, plays, essays

Willem Frederik Hermans (Dutch pronunciation: [ˈʋɪləɱ ˈfreːdərɪk ˈɦɛrmɑns]; 1 September 1921 – 27 April 1995) was a Dutch author of poetry, novels, short stories, plays, as well as book-length studies, essays, and literary criticism. His most famous works are The House of Refuge (novella, 1952), The Darkroom of Damocles (novel, 1958), and Beyond Sleep (novel, 1966).

After World War II, Hermans tried to live off his writing exclusively, but as his country was recovering from the Occupation, he had no opportunity to sustain himself. He published three collections of short stories from 1948 to 1957, chief among them the novella The House of Refuge (1952), and in 1958 became lecturer in physical geography at Groningen University, a position he retained until his move to Paris, France, in 1973. The same year 1958 he broke to a wide audience with The Darkroom of Damocles.

In the 1970s, Hermans played an important role in the unmasking of Friedrich Weinreb as a cheater of Jews in the war. Hermans refused to accept the P. C. Hooft Award for 1971. In 1977, he received the Prijs der Nederlandse Letteren, the most prestigious literary award available for writers in the language, handed out every three years alternately by the reigning Dutch and Belgian monarchs to a writer of the other country, the Belgian king Boudewijn handing the prize to Hermans. Hermans is considered one of De Grote Drie, the three most important authors in the Netherlands in the postwar period, along with Harry Mulisch and Gerard Reve.

== Biography ==
=== Early life ===
Willem Frederik Hermans was born on 1 September 1921 in Amsterdam to Johannes ('Johan') Hermans (1879–1967) and Hendrika ('Rika') Hillegonda Hermans-Eggelte (1884–1967), who already had a daughter, Cornelia ('Corry') Geertruida (1918–1940). His paternal great-grandfather and grandfather were breadbakers in the town of Brielle, members of the Dutch Reformed Church, and from the ranks of the "lower bourgeoisie." Johan Hermans, the only one of the eight children (two sons and six daughters) allowed to pursue an education, became a grammar-school teacher. Hermans' predominantly Lutheran maternal family was slightly more middle-class. All three sons of the great-grandfather, a goldsmith, became schoolteachers.

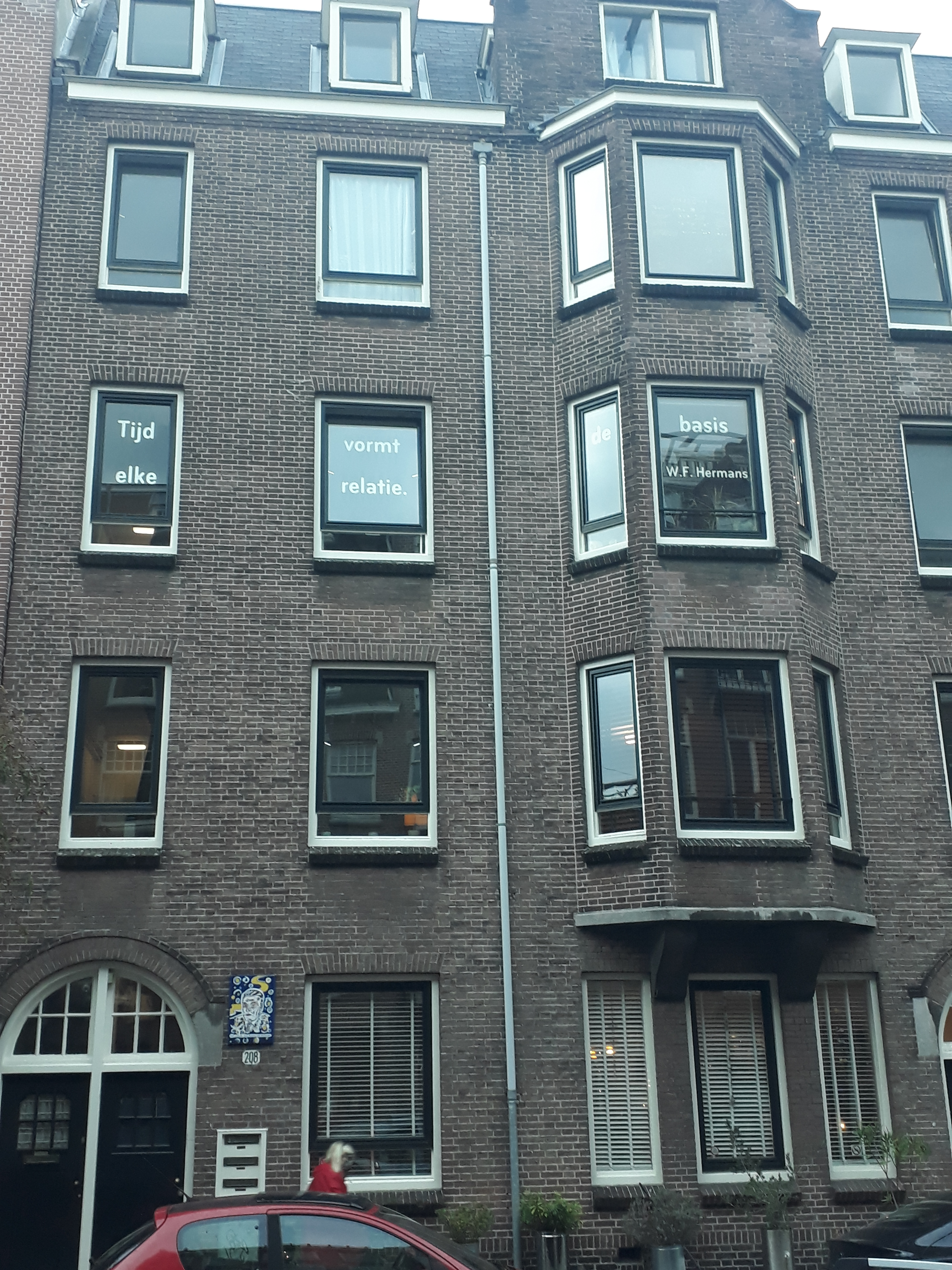
From 1929 until 1 October 1945 Willem Frederik Hermans lived on the top floor and two rooms on the ceiling with his sister Cornelia (1918-1940) and parents. Mr. and Mrs. Hermans lived there until they both died in the 1960s.

Johan Hermans graduated as a teacher in 1898 and began his career as a teacher the same year in the Amsterdam area, where he met his future wife who was a teacher at the same school he worked. After their marriage in 1913, Rika Hermans quit working and devoted herself to the household. The couple's first child was born five years later. From 1913 to 1929, they lived on the second floor (Note: In a correct translation into American English, Dutch floor counts must be upped by one, because the groundfloor is not included in the Dutch count. Otterspeer 2013, 62 counts the Hermans place as the first floor (eenhoog).) of an apartment in the "Old West" part of Amsterdam, near the center of the city, in a neighbourhood with blocks built in 1910 specially to accommodate schoolteachers. In 1929, the family moved to another apartment in the same block, where they occupied the fourth floor, Corry having a large room for herself in the attic. Johan Hermans continued to improve his teaching qualifications, eventually rising to teach beyond grammar school. Though his own career was unremarkable, he had great ambitions for his two children, both of whom he sent to the prestigious Barlaeus Gymnasium, evidently to have them prepared for a college education. To save money to pay for such education, the parents were forced to be as tight with money as they could, especially since the salaries of teachers would be decreased thirteen times in the years from 1925 to 1940, with a 10% decrease in the period 1930-1933 alone. These were precisely the years when their children were growing up.

Hermans's intelligence first emerged at grammar school, where he was included in the selection of four boys who were taught a more challenging Arithmetic course than was demanded of the other classmates. Apart from that, he followed the standard curriculum: Reading, Writing, Geography (with attention to the Dutch Indies), Native History, Gymnastics, and Singing. The grades of his admittance to the Gymnasium in 1940 were generally good, though not outstanding.

Hermans's reading, remarkably well-documented from early age onward, included some favorites he could read again and again without exhausting them. Most important were children's versions of classic works: he cited the legend of King Arthur, which never ceased to give him the chills even as an elderly man, as "the most significative work" of his youth. Gulliver's Travels, Robinson Crusoe, which he could read over and over without ever getting enough of it. Alice in Wonderland both charmed and scared him, especially the poem on Father William. Besides these international classics, he also read Dutch children's book, most notably Woutertje Pieterse by Multatuli.

Hermans's parents were unreligious and did not have a Bible at home. Yet on a visit with his parents to an acquaintance of theirs who was religious, he discovered a Bible for children by Siebold Ulfers, one of the century's most popular children's Bibles for its beautiful illustrations. He was allowed to take it home, though his father had some misgivings. Hermans was fascinated especially by the cruel Old Testament stories of Ahab and Jezebel, and of Jehu and Jehoram.

Hermans's interest in science, technology and especially inventors also emerged during these years. Angel's 1927 biography of Thomas Alva Edison was a favorite, and Bernard Jaffe's Crucibles. The Story of Chemistry, read in a Dutch translation, also made an enormous impression on the young Hermans.

In 1933, Hermans enrolled in the prestigious Barlaeus Gymnasium in Amsterdam, where most teachers held an academic degree, often a doctorate. The curriculum in the first class was Latin, Dutch, French, History, Geography, Arithmetic, and Biology. In the second year this was augmented with Greek and German. In the first two classes, Hermans's results were mediocre at best, and when he had to double the third class for lack of applying himself, he vowed such thing would never happen to him again. During this time, Hermans had fallen under the spell of literature. When the school staged a performance of Sophocles's Antigone, Hermans was given a minor role, but the play left a lasting impression upon him: "It was my first introduction to the kind of literature that could swipe away the everyday world like a dull nightmare." In that period, during the lessons in German, Hermans delivered oral reports (in German) on Franz Kafka and Thomas Mann.

=== 1950–1995 ===
Hermans married Emmy Meurs (1923–2008), a Surinam woman, in 1950.

In 1957, Hermans worked as volunteer assistant to photographer Nico Jesse while writing his The Darkroom of Damocles (De donkere kamer van Damocles) which features a mysteriously blank photograph. In 1958, he was appointed reader in physical geography at Groningen University. In 1972, after accusations by among others the Calvinist Member of Parliament and later minister Jan de Koning that Hermans was using his time writing instead of lecturing, a parliamentary committee was set up to investigate the matter. The committee found that Hermans's chief crime was his use of university stationery for writing his notes.

In 1973, he resigned and settled as a full-time writer in Paris. In Onder professoren (Among Professors) (1975) he described university life in Groningen in a bitter and satirical way. It can be read as a roman à clef and was entirely written on the empty sides of university letters, according to Hermans's alter ego Zomerplaag "to do something useful with this expensive paper that would normally disappear unread in the garbage bin, polluting the environment".

Hermans received honorary doctorates from the University of Liège (Luik) in 1990 and the University of Pretoria in 1993.

== Themes ==
Underlying all of Hermans's works, says Hermans scholar Frans A. Janssen, is the theme of epistemological nihilism. Only the means employed by logic and the sciences are capable of producing reliable knowledge. All other fields of study, including philosophy, ethics, psychology, the humanities and societal studies, are unable to produce knowledge that can be called reliable or certain. Literature and the arts can "show truths" by employing irrational devices. For the greatest part the world is unknowable, and even language is no reliable tool of communication. Hermans's characters are personifications of this state of affairs, loners who continuously misinterpret the reality surrounding them, unable to do something meaningful with other interpretive views when confronted with them, victims to the mercy of chance, misunderstanding. They fail, going under to the discrepancy between the world and their representation of it. Eventually in this world eternal powers as aggressiveness and the strife for power win. There is no place for such concepts as freedom, responsibility, idealism: in the jungle of human existence a sacrifice for a good cause is meaningless. Specific elements of this pessimistic worldview are kindred to Marquis de Sade, Heinrich von Kleist, Arthur Schopenhauer, Sigmund Freud, Louis-Ferdinand Céline and Ludwig Wittgenstein.

There does not exist any benefit of hindsight, and the past is just as unknowable as is the present, if only because the past is never fully accessible. Osewoudt, the protagonist of The Darkroom of Damocles, is unable to convince others of his past achievements, and geologist Alfred, the protagonist of Beyond Sleep, is not sure if he would recognize a meteorite crater if he saw one.

A recurrent theme in many of the author's novels and stories is the discrepancy between the protagonists' own view of themselves and the images that others have of them. Essentially, this the problem of Osewoudt of the war novel The Darkroom of Damocles (1958), who driven to despair to find acceptance for his view of himself. Unable to achieve such acceptance, he loses his identity as well as his life.

== Style ==
His style is existentialist and generally bleak, and his writing style is unique in Dutch literature with its short and pointed sentences. There is no doubt that he was influenced by World War II and the German occupation of the Netherlands between 1940 and 1945, and his longer novels (De tranen der acacia's and De donkere kamer van Damokles) are set during the war. Even his more upbeat writings (Onder professoren and Au pair) can have a strange, existentialist twist to them.

== Controversies ==
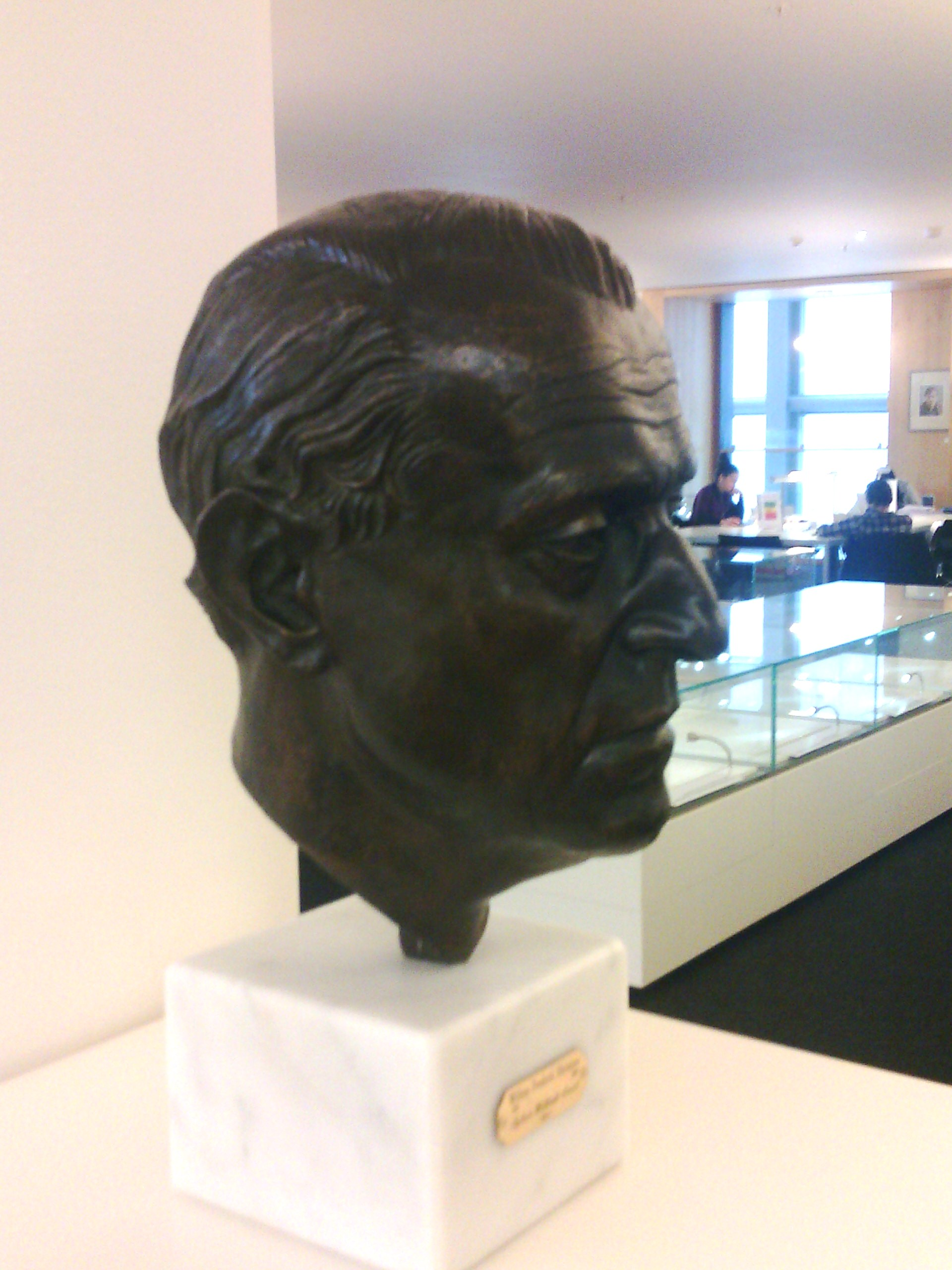
Bronze portrait W.F. Hermans. Sculptor: Sylvia Quiël. Location: Public Library Amsterdam.

Hermans was notorious for his polemics, demonstrated in particular in the 'Weinreb affair', when he played a key role in unmasking a Jewish imposter who claimed to have been a resistance fighter helping other Jews during the Nazi occupation of the Netherlands.

In 1986, the Mayor and City Council of Amsterdam officially declared Hermans persona non grata after a visit to, South Africa in 1983 in defiance of a cultural boycott because of apartheid. Being married to a non-white woman, Hermans was unrepentant. He did not return to his home city until 1993 after the City Council revoked their decision upon Hermans' insistence.

In 1979 Hermans reviewed an issue of the first volume of memoirs of the author C. Buddingh'. His criticisms were so devastating that the next volume was published only in 1995, ten years after the death of Buddings - and several months after that of Hermans.

== Translations in English ==
The earliest translation into English of a Hermans work was the novella The House of Refuge (translated by Estelle Debrot), which Steven Marcus included in his collection The World of Modern Fiction (New York, 1966). The original is called Het behouden huis and runs to just under 80 pages. Het behouden huis was translated into English again in 2017 by David Colmer and published by Archipelago Books as An Untouched House (2018).

In 2006, the novel Beyond Sleep (translated by Ina Rilke) was published. The story is about a geological expedition in the north of Norway, where the sun never sets. The original is from 1966 and is called Nooit meer slapen and ranks as one of Hermans's two most important works. The other work, The Darkroom of Damocles, also translated by Ina Rilke, was published in 2007. The novel is set during the occupation in World War II, and the protagonist, a member of the Dutch resistance against the Germans, is unable to come up with evidence for his resistance activities when the war is over. The original is from 1958. Le Carré's spy novel The Spy Who Came in from the Cold was in part inspired by Herman's The Darkroom of Damocles, who suspected plagiarism.

In 2021, Archipelago Books published Hermans' novel Herinneringen van een engelbewaarder (again translated by David Colmer) as A Guardian Angel Recalls. This bleakly humorous work, set on the eve of Nazi Germany's invasion of the Netherlands in 1940, follows the travails of Alberegt, a lovelorn public prosecutor who has just seen off his mistress, a German-Jewish refugee steaming to the safety of America. Accompanied by his guardian angel as well as the devil, Alberegt races his Renault recklessly through the Hook of Holland. Despite the determined efforts of his guardian angel, a moment's inattention leads to a catastrophe that Alberegt is ill-equipped to handle, just as the German war machine begins its onslaught on the poorly prepared Dutch.

== Bibliography (selection) ==
- Moedwil en misverstand/Intention and misunderstanding (short stories, 1948)
- De tranen der acacia's/The tears of the acacias (novel, 1949)
- Ik heb altijd gelijk/I am always right (novel, 1951)
- Het behouden huis/An Untouched House (novella, 1951)
- Paranoia (short stories, 1953)
- Description et genèse des dépôts meubles de surface et du relief de l'Oesling (dissertation, 1955)
- De God Denkbaar Denkbaar De God/The God Thinkable Thinkable the God (novel, 1956)
- Drie melodrama's/Three pieces of melodrama (novel/short stories, 1957)
- Een landingspoging op Newfoundland/An attemptive landing on Newfoundland (short stories, 1957)
- The Darkroom of Damocles (De donkere kamer van Damokles, novel, 1958)
- Beyond Sleep (Nooit meer slapen, novel, 1966)
- Een wonderkind of een total loss/A child prodigy or a total loss (stories, 1967)
- Herinneringen van een engelbewaarder/Memories of a guardian angel (novel, 1971)
- Het evangelie van O. Dapper Dapper/The gospel of O. Dapper Dapper (novel, 1973)
- Onder professoren/Amongst professors (novel, 1975)
- Filip's sonatine (short story, 1980)
- Uit talloos veel miljoenen/From innumerable millions (novel, 1981)
- Geijerstein's dynamiek/Geijerstein's dynamic (short story, 1982)
- De zegelring/The signet ring (short story, 1984)
- Een heilige van de horlogerie/The saint of the clockmakers (novel, 1987)
- Au pair (novel, 1989)
- De laatste roker/The last smoker (short stories, 1991)
- In de mist van het schimmenrijk/In the mist of the shadow empire (short story, 1993; boekenweekgeschenk (Dutch Book Week Gift), later published as Madelon in de mist van het schimmenrijk/Madelon in the mist of the shadow empire)
- Ruisend gruis/Rustling grit (novel, published after his death in 1995)

== See also ==
- NRC's Best Dutch novels

== Sources ==
- Janssen, F.A. (in Dutch). (1985). "Hermans, Willem Frederik." G.J. van Bork and P.J. Verkruijsse, The Dutch and Flemish Authors from Medieval Times to the Present, Including the Frisian Authors. Weesp: De Haan.
- Otterspeer, Willem (in Dutch) (2013). De mislukkingskunstenaar: Willem Frederik Hermans. Biografie, deel 1 (1921-1952), De Bezige Bij, Amsterdam. [The Artist of Failure: Willem Frederik Hermans. A Biography, Vol. 1, (1921-1952)]
- Raat, G.F.H. (in Dutch). (1989). "Alfred and His Mirror Image. Narrative Voice in Beyond Sleep". In: Wilbert Smulders (red.), Verboden toegang. Essays over het werk van Willem Frederik Hermans gevolgd door een vraaggesprek met de schrijver. De Bezige Bij, Amsterdam 1989, p. 204-228. Retrieved 1 September 2014.
