= The Darkroom of Damocles =

1958 war novel by the Dutch writer Willem Frederik Hermans

- Author: Willem Frederik Hermans
- Original title: De donkere kamer van Damokles
- Translator: Roy Edwards
- Language: Dutch
- Publisher: G. A. van Oorschot
- Publication date: 1958
- Publication place: Netherlands
- English publication date: 1962
- Pages: 335

The Darkroom of Damocles (Dutch: De donkere kamer van Damokles) is a war novel by the Dutch writer Willem Frederik Hermans, published in 1958. An immediate success since it was first published, the novel has been printed in numerous editions and is considered one of the greatest World War II novels. The book has been translated into English twice, in 1962 by Roy Edwards, and again in 2007 by Ina Rilke. It was adapted into the 1963 film Like Two Drops of Water, directed by Fons Rademakers. Le Carré's spy novel The Spy Who Came in from the Cold was in part inspired by The Darkroom of Damocles by Hermans, who suspected plagiarism.

In the 1971 Dutch re-edition, Hermans added a quote from Ludwig Wittgenstein's Philosophical Investigations § 462, viz. "I can look for him when he is not there, but not hang him when he is not there. One might want to say: 'But he must be somewhere there if I am looking for him.' - Then he must be somewhere there too if I don't find him and even if he doesn't exist at all."

== Plot ==
Osewoudt is a young man who was born two months premature. Hairless, short, half an inch short of fitness for military service, he owned a cigar store in Voorschoten, near Leiden. Living under the Nazi occupation, he makes his acquaintance with the mysterious Dorbeck, who claims to be involved in the Resistance movement. The latter looks like Osewoudt's double, except that he is flawlessly perfect. Seduced by Dorbeck, Osewoudt joins the fight against the Germans. Faithfully, he carries out the orders that come to him by telephone, by post, from unknown envoys or, sometimes, from Dorbeck himself during their brief meetings. Dorbeck enlists Osewoudt for dangerous attacks on the Gestapo and Dutch Nazi collaborators, even killing innocent people he considers a possible danger. After the war's end, Dorbeck has disappeared, and Osewoudt is arrested for collaboration. Despite his confessions of the killings, and even atrocities he committed against collaborators and occupiers, the military prosecutors do not believe him. He cannot prove his innocence, and even though his accusers cannot either, he is condemned nevertheless. Despite Osewoudt's account of his activities, the authorities suspect him of collaboration and intern him in a camp while his case is investigated. He cannot substantiate his story because nearly everyone who could confirm Dorbeck's existence is dead or missing. His last hope is a photograph that he believes shows himself and Dorbeck together, but when the film is developed it instead shows Osewoudt with the German officer Ebernuss. In despair, Osewoudt runs from the building where he is being held and is shot.

== Reception ==
Neel Mukherjee of The Daily Telegraph wrote in 2007: "The novel, written in a spare, even desiccated style, becomes starkly existentialist, bringing to mind Camus and the Sartre of Les Chemins de la Liberté. Crackling with tension at the same time as a philosophical cynicism - or perhaps just an uninterested amorality - about motives and actions, this is an edgy, uneasy novel about the human condition, effortlessly disguised as a thriller."

According to Milan Kundera, in Hermans' novel we can find a sort of "black poetry": In order to eliminate a Gestapo collaborator in a secluded villa, Osewoudt is obliged to first kill two unwitting and innocent women ("if the word 'innocent' has its place in Hermans' world"), the collaborator's wife and a lady who arrives at the villa to take the couple's little boy to Amsterdam. Osewoudt decides at first to spare the latter's life, but then, to protect himself, he must turn on him. He drives him to the station, stays with him on the train, then in the streets of Amsterdam; the spoiled child brags about in a pointless and long conversation during which Osewoudt only listens to. The "black poetry", for Kundera, consists in this case in the meeting of the triple murder and the prattle of an exhibitionist child.

== See also ==
- 1958 in literature
- Dutch literature

== Sources ==
=== Textual Studies ===
- Frans A. Janssen en Sonja van Stek (in Dutch), Bibliographical Description of All Editions of The Darkroom of Damocles. In Frans A. Janssen en Sonja van Stek, Het bibliografische universum van Willem Frederik Hermans [The Bibliographical Universe of Willem Frederik Hermans]. Tweede, herziene en uitgebreide versie in samenwerking met Peter Kegel, Willem Frederik Hermans Instituut, 2005, 81-99.
- Editors of the Huygens Institute (in Dutch), Textual History, Adopted Readings and Emendations of The Darkroom of Damocles (1958)

=== Criticism ===
- Frans A. Janssen (in Dutch), On The Darkroom of Damocles by Willem Frederik Hermans. This book has chapters on Publication history, Plot Summary, Interpretation, Interpretations by Other Critics, The Doppelgänger Motif, Narrative Technique, Style and Structure, Reception. Uitgeverij De Arbeiderspers, Amsterdam 1983
- René Marres (in Dutch), The Interpretation of The Darkroom of Damocles by Willem Frederik Hermans. Dimensie Boeken, Leiden 1996
