= Culture of the Netherlands =

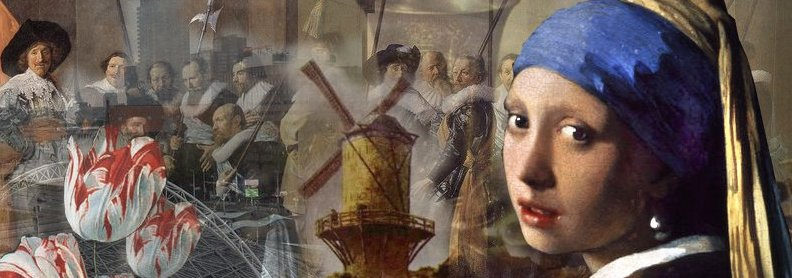
Some symbols and works of Dutch culture

The culture of the Netherlands is diverse, reflecting regional differences as well as the foreign influences built up by centuries of the Dutch people's mercantile and explorative spirit. The Netherlands and its people have long played an important role as centre of cultural liberalism and tolerance. The Dutch Golden Age is popularly regarded as its zenith.

== Language ==
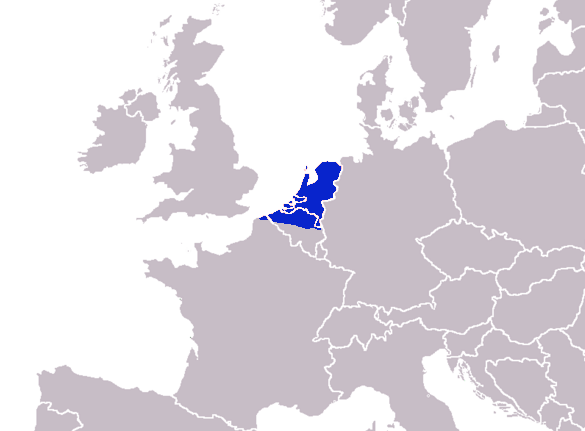
A map illustrating the area in which Dutch is spoken.

The official language of the Netherlands is Dutch, spoken by almost all people in the Netherlands. Dutch is also spoken and official in Aruba, Belgium, Curaçao, Sint Maarten and Suriname. It is a West Germanic, Low Franconian language that originated in the Early Middle Ages (c. 470) and was standardized in the 16th century. Frisian is also a recognized language, used by the government in the province of Friesland. Several dialects of Low Saxon (Nedersaksisch in Dutch) are spoken in much of the north and east and are recognized by the Netherlands as regional languages according to the European Charter for Regional or Minority Languages. Another Dutch dialect granted the status of regional language is Limburgish, which is spoken in the south-eastern province of Limburg. However, both Dutch Low Saxon and Limburgish spread across the Dutch-German border and belong to a common Dutch-Low German dialect continuum.

There is a tradition of learning foreign languages in the Netherlands: about 89% of the total population have a good knowledge of English, 70% of German, 29% of French and 5% of Spanish.

== Religion ==
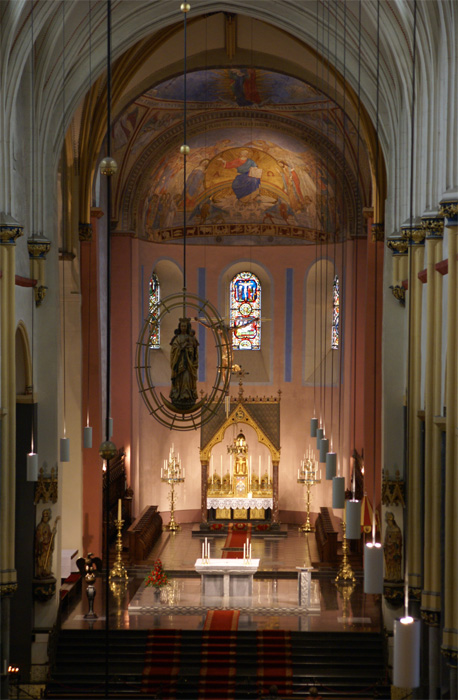
The Basilica of Saint Servatius (built 570) in Maastricht is the oldest church in the Netherlands.

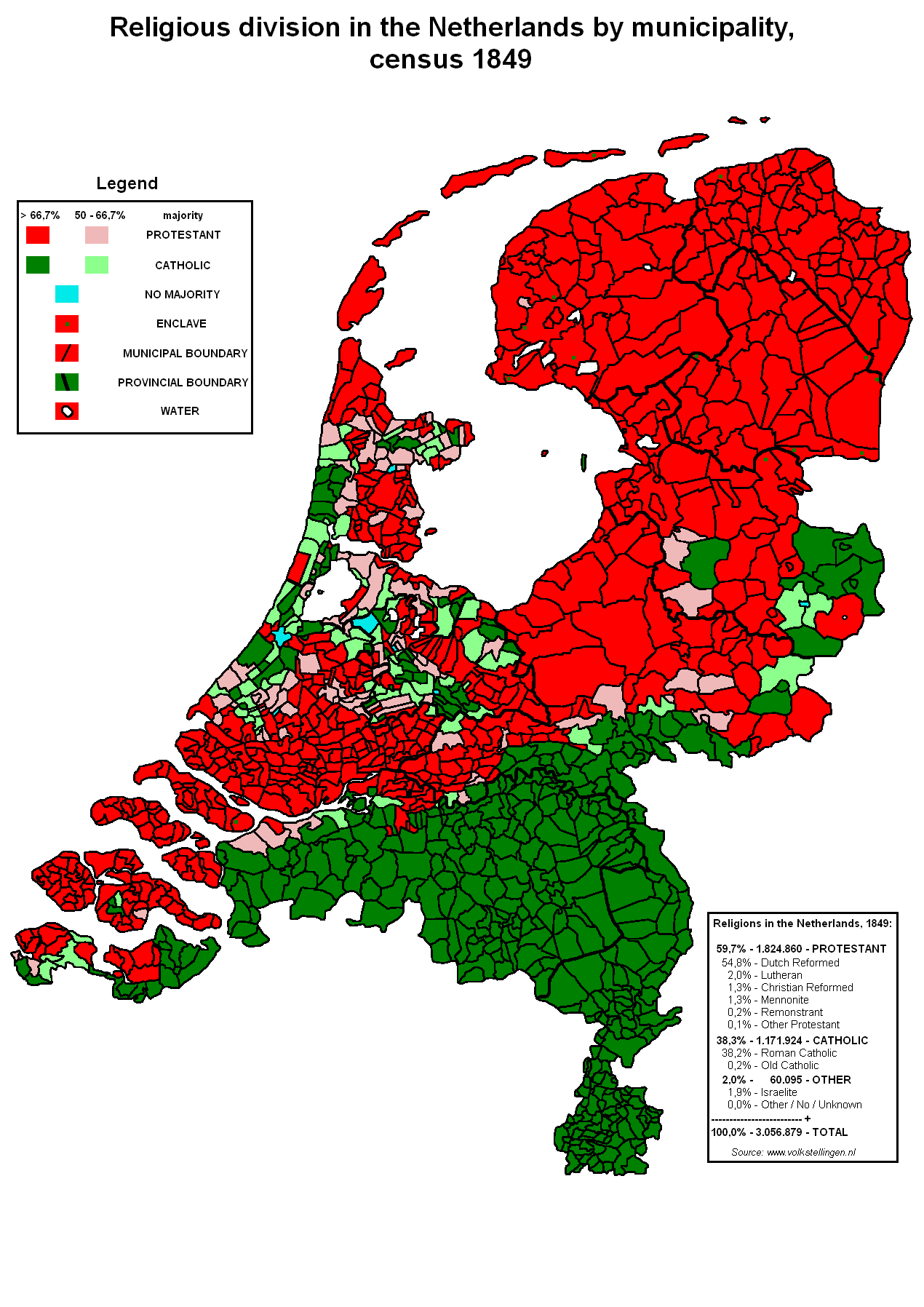
Dutch religion in 1849

Beliefs in the Netherlands (2015)
1. Atheism (25.0%)
2. Agnostic (31.0%)
3. Ietsism (27.0%)
4. Theism (17.0%)
Religions in the Netherlands (2015)
1. Irreligion (67.8%)
2. Roman Catholicism (11.7%)
3. Protestant Church in the Netherlands (8.60%)
4. Other Christian denominations (4.20%)
5. Islam (5.80%)
6. Hinduism and Buddhism (2.00%)

Between the Celtic and Germanic peoples and later the Roman conquerors a cultural exchange took place. An adaptation of polytheistic religions and each other's myths took place among the various tribes, coming from the Germanic, Celtic and later Roman mythology. From the 4th to the 6th century AD The Great Migration took place, in which the small Celtic-Germanic-Roman tribes in the Low Countries were gradually supplanted by three major Germanic tribes: the Franks, the Frisians and the Saxons. Around 500 the Franks, initially residing between the Rhine and the Somme embraced Christianity under the auspices of King Clovis I. However, it would take at least until AD 1000 before all the pagans were actually Christianized and the Frisian and Saxon religions became extinct, although elements were incorporated into the local Christian religion. The following centuries Catholic Christianity was the only mainstream religion in the Netherlands. The rebellious Netherlands that had united in the Union of Utrecht (1579) declared their independence from Spain in 1581, during the Eighty Years' War; Spain finally accepted this in 1648. The Dutch revolt was partially religiously motivated: during the Reformation many of the Dutch had adopted Lutheran, Anabaptist, Calvinist or Mennonite forms of Protestantism. These religious movements were suppressed by the Spanish, who supported the Counter Reformation. After independence the Netherlands adopted Calvinism as a quasi-state religion (although never formally), but practiced a degree of religious tolerance towards non-Calvinists.

Until late into the 20th century, the predominant religion in the Netherlands was Christianity. Although religious diversity remains, there has been a decline in religious adherence. In 2006, 34% of the Dutch population identified as Christian, decreasing till in 2015 almost 25% of the population adhered to one of the Christian faiths (11.7% Roman Catholic, 8.6% PKN, 4.2% other small Christian denominations), 5% is Muslim and 2% adheres to Hinduism or Buddhism, based on independent in-depth interviewing by Radboud University and Vrije Universiteit Amsterdam. Approximately 67.8% of the population in 2015 has no religious affiliation, up from 61% in 2006, 53% in 1996, 43% 1979 and 33% in 1966. The Sociaal en Cultureel Planbureau (Social and Cultural Planning Agency, SCP) expects the number of non-affiliated Dutch to be at 72% in 2020.

A large majority of the Dutch population believes that religion should not have a determining role to play in politics and education. Religion is also decreasingly seen as a social binder, and is generally considered a personal matter which should not be propagated in public. The Dutch constitution guarantees freedom of education, which means that all schools that adhere to general quality criteria receive the same government funding. This includes schools based on religious principles by religious groups (especially Roman Catholic and various Protestant). Three political parties in the Dutch parliament, (CDA, and two small parties, ChristianUnion and SGP) are based upon the Christian belief. Several Christian religious holidays are national holidays (Christmas, Easter, Pentecost and the Ascension of Jesus). In the late 19th century atheism began to rise as secularism, liberalism and socialism grew; in the 1960s and 1970s Protestantism and Catholicism notably began to decline. There is one major exception: Islam, which grew considerably as the result of immigration. Since the year 2000, there has been raised awareness of religion, mainly due to Muslim extremism. Islam is not part of the Dutch identity, culture or tradition. In 2013 a Catholic became Queen consort.

From a December 2014 survey by the VU University Amsterdam it was concluded that for the first time there are more atheists (25%) than theists (17%) in the Netherlands. The majority of the population being agnostic (31%) or ietsists (27%). Atheism, agnosticism and Christian atheism are on the rise and are widely accepted and considered to be non-controversial. Among those who adhere to Christianity, there are high percentages of atheists, agnostics and ietsism, since affiliation with a Christian denomination is also used in a way of cultural identification in the different parts of the Netherlands. In 2015, a vast majority of the inhabitants of the Netherlands (82%) said they had never or almost never visited a church, and 59% stated that they had never been to a church of any kind. Of all the people questioned, 24% saw themselves as atheist, which is an increase of 11% compared to the previous study done in 2006. The expected rise of spirituality (ietsism) has come to a halt according to research in 2015. In 2006, 40% of respondents considered themselves spiritual, in 2015 this has dropped to 31%. The number who believed in the existence of a higher power fell from 36% to 28% over the same period.

Christianity is currently the largest religion in the Netherlands. The provinces of North Brabant and Limburg have historically been strongly Roman Catholic, and some of their people might still consider the Catholic Church as a base for their cultural identity. Protestantism in the Netherlands consists of a number of churches within various traditions. The largest of these is the Protestant Church in the Netherlands (PKN), a United church which is Reformed and Lutheran in orientation. It was formed in 2004 as a merger of the Dutch Reformed Church, the Reformed Churches in the Netherlands and a smaller Lutheran Church. Several orthodox Reformed and liberal churches did not merge into the PKN. Although in the Netherlands as a whole Christianity has become a minority, the Netherlands contains a Bible Belt from Zeeland to the northern parts of the province Overijssel, in which Protestant (particularly Reformed) beliefs remain strong, and even has majorities in municipal councils.

Islam is the second-largest religion in the state. In 2012, there were about 825,000 Muslims in the Netherlands (5% of the population). Muslim numbers increased from the 1960s as a consequence of large numbers of migrant workers. These included migrants from former Dutch colonies, such as Surinam and Indonesia, but mainly migrant workers from Turkey and Morocco. During the 1990s, Muslim refugees arrived from countries like Bosnia and Herzegovina, Iran, Iraq, Somalia, and Afghanistan.

Other religions account for some 6% of the Dutch people. Hinduism is a minority religion in the Netherlands, with around 215,000 adherents (slightly over 1% of the population). Most of these are Indo-Surinamese. There are also sizable populations of Hindu immigrants from India and Sri Lanka, and some Western adherents of Hinduism-oriented new religious movements such as Hare Krishnas. The Netherlands has an estimated 250,000 Buddhists or people strongly attracted to this religion, mainly ethnic Dutch people. There are about 45,000 Jews in the Netherlands.

== Art and media ==
=== Art ===
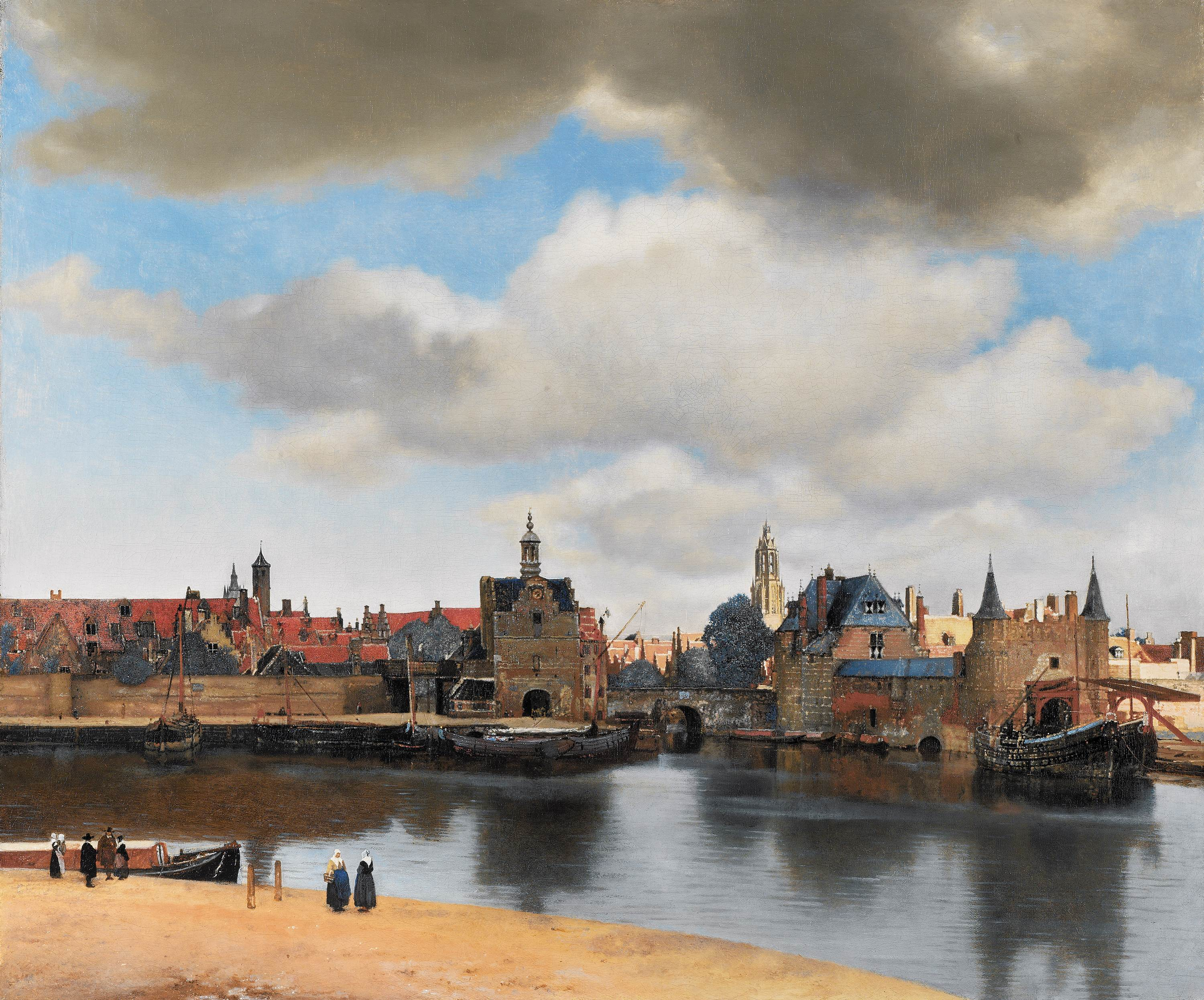
Johannes Vermeer, View of Delft (Mauritshuis, The Hague) 1660-1661

Dutch Golden Age painting was among the most acclaimed in the world at the time, during the 17th century. There was an enormous output of painting, so much so that prices declined seriously during the period. From the 1620s, Dutch painting broke decisively from the Baroque style typified by Rubens in neighbouring Flanders into a more realistic style of depiction, very much concerned with the real world. Types of paintings included historical paintings, portraiture, landscapes and cityscapes, still lifes and genre paintings. In the last four of these categories, Dutch painters established styles upon which art in Europe depended for the next two centuries. Paintings often had a moralistic subtext. The Golden Age never really recovered from the French invasion of 1672, although there was a twilight period lasting until about 1710.

Dutch painters, especially in the northern provinces, tried to evoke emotions in the spectator by letting him/her be a bystander to a scene of profound intimacy. Portrait painting thrived in the Netherlands in the 17th century. A great many portraits were commissioned by wealthy individuals. Group portraits similarly were often ordered by prominent members of a city's civilian guard, by boards of trustees and regents, and the like. Often group portraits were paid for by each portrayed person individually. The key example to this is The Night Watch by Rembrandt. The amount paid determined each person's place in the picture, either head to toe in full regalia in the foreground or face only in the back of the group. Sometimes all group members paid an equal sum, which was likely to lead to quarrels when some members gained a more prominent place in the picture than others. Allegories, in which painted objects conveyed symbolic meaning about the subject, were often applied. Many genre paintings, which seemingly only depicted everyday life, actually illustrated Dutch proverbs and sayings, or conveyed a moralistic message, the meaning of which is not always easy to decipher nowadays. Favourite topics in Dutch landscapes were the dunes along the western seacoast, rivers with their broad adjoining meadows where cattle grazed, often a silhouette of a city in the distance.

Vincent van Gogh, Starry Night, 1889, Museum of Modern Art, New York City

The Hague School were around at the start of the 19th century. They showed all that is gravest or brightest in the landscape of Holland, all that is heaviest or clearest in its atmosphere. Amsterdam Impressionism was current during the middle of the Nineteenth century at about the same time as French Impressionism. The painters put their impressions onto canvas with rapid, visible strokes of the brush. They focused on depicting the everyday life of the city. Late nineteenth-century Amsterdam was a bustling centre of art and literature. Vincent van Gogh was a post-Impressionist painter whose work, notable for its rough beauty, emotional honesty and bold color, had a far-reaching influence on 20th-century art. In the 20th century, the Netherlands produced many fine painters and artists including (but not limited to): Roelof Frankot, Salomon Garf, Pyke Koch and many more. Around 1905-1910 pointillism was flourishing. Between 1911 and 1914 all the latest art movements arrived in the Netherlands one after another including cubism, futurism and expressionism. After World War I, De Stijl (the style) was led by Piet Mondrian and promoted a pure art, consisting only of vertical and horizontal lines, and the use of primary colours.

=== Architecture ===
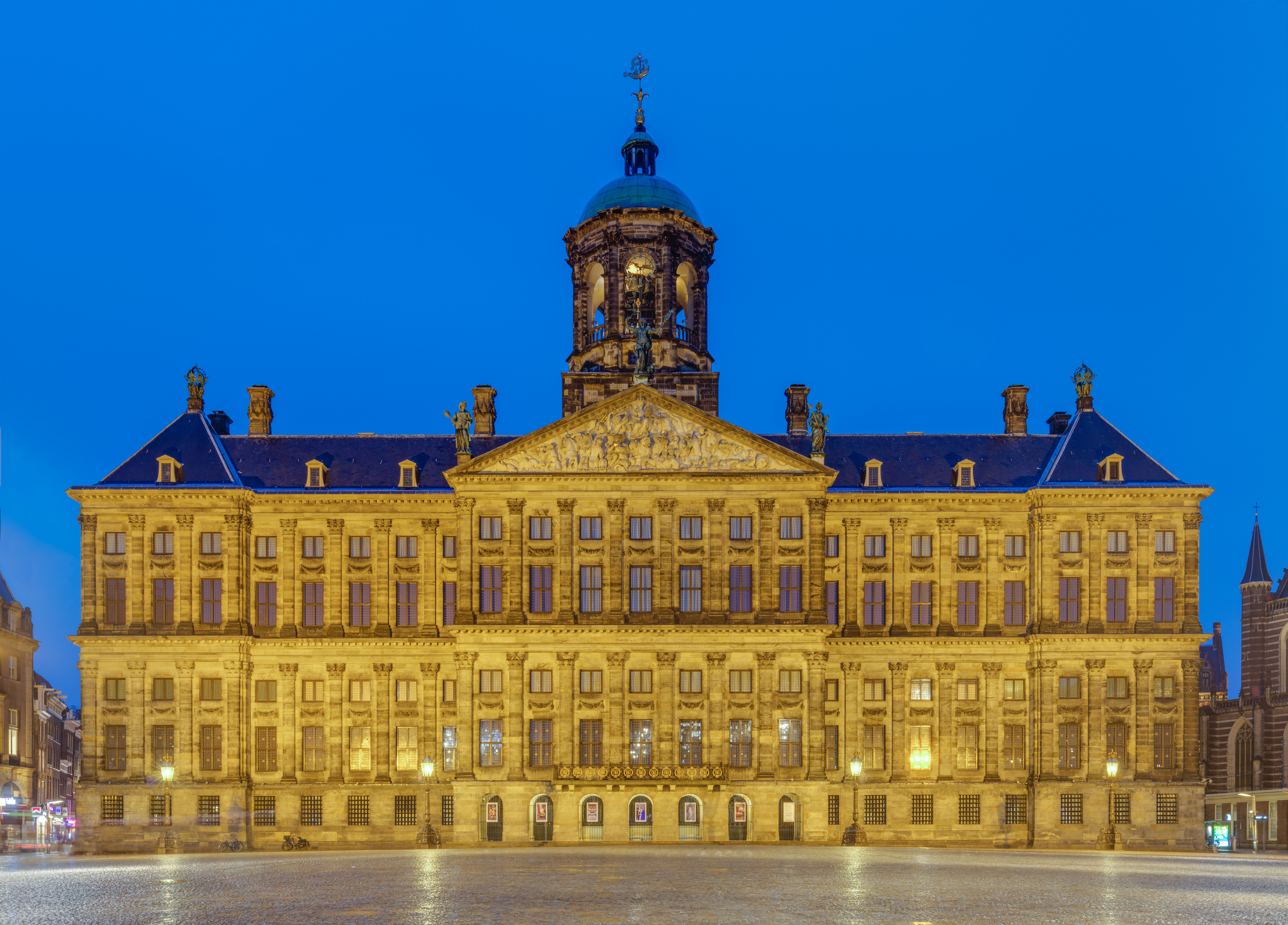
Koninklijk Paleis (Royal Palace of Amsterdam) by Jacob van Campen

The Dutch Golden Age roughly spanned the 17th century. Due to the thriving economy, cities expanded greatly. New town halls and storehouses were built, and many new canals were dug out in and around various cities such as Delft, Leiden and Amsterdam for defence and transport purposes. Many wealthy merchants had a new house built along these canals. These houses were generally very narrow and had ornamented façades that befitted their new status. The reason they were narrow was because a house was taxed on the width of the façade. The architecture of the first republic in Northern Europe was marked by sobriety and restraint, and was meant to reflect democratic values by quoting extensively from classical antiquity. In general, architecture in the Low Countries, both in the Counter-Reformation-influenced south and Protestant-dominated north, remained strongly invested in northern Italian Renaissance and Mannerist forms that predated the Roman High Baroque style of Borromini and Bernini. Instead, the more austere form practiced in the Dutch Republic was well suited to major building patterns: palaces for the House of Orange and new civic buildings, uninfluenced by the Counter-Reformation style that made some headway in Antwerp. At the end of the 19th century there was a remarkable neo-Gothic stream or Gothic Revival both in church and in public architecture, notably by the Roman Catholic Pierre Cuypers, who was inspired by the Frenchman Viollet le Duc. The Amsterdam Rijksmuseum (1876–1885) and Amsterdam Centraal Station (1881–1889) belong to his main buildings.

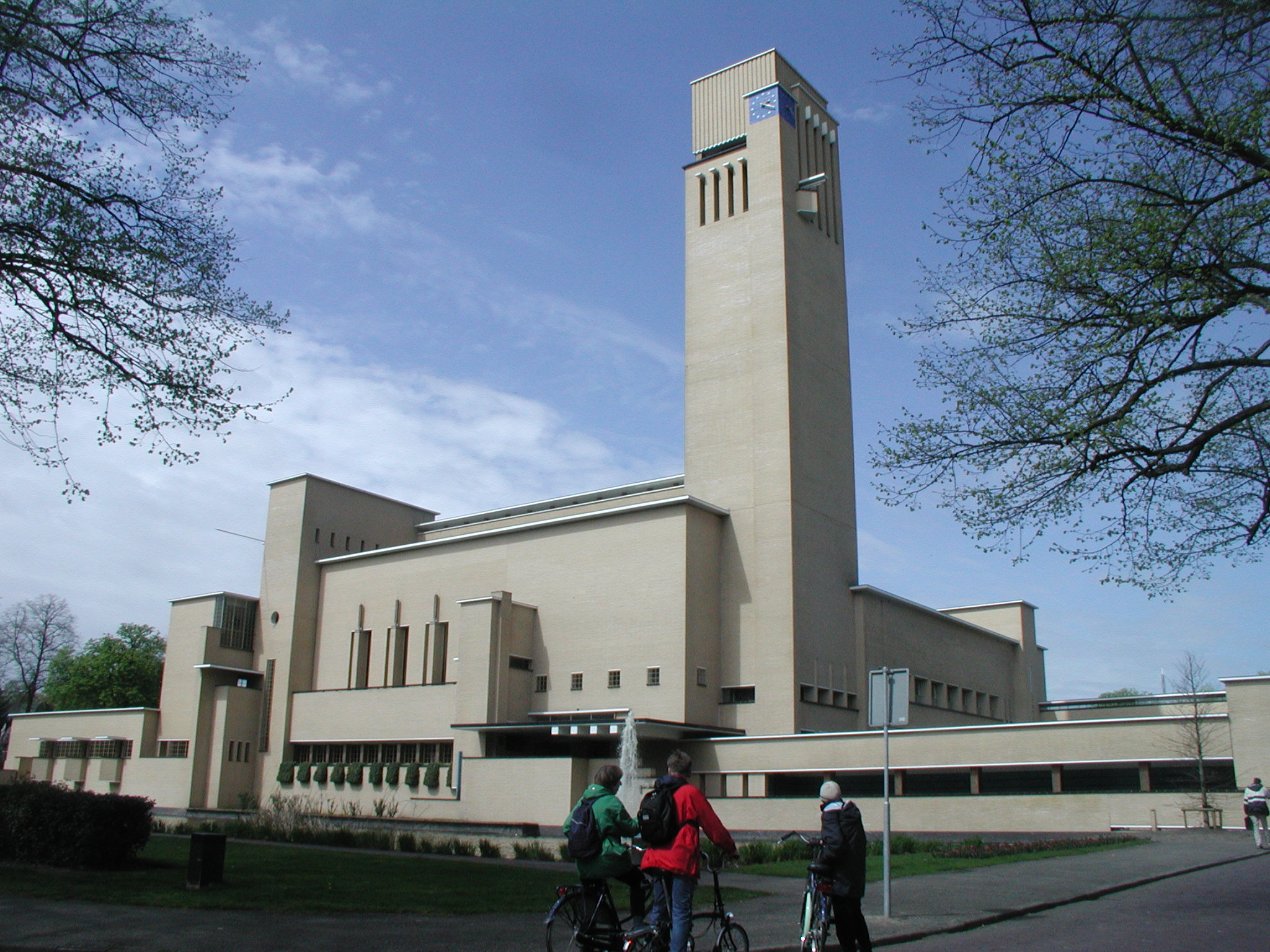
Hilversum City Hall by Willem Marinus Dudok

During the 20th century Dutch architects played a leading role in the development of modern architecture. Out of the early 20th century rationalist architecture of Berlage, architect of the Beurs van Berlage, three separate groups developed during the 1920s, each with their own view on which direction modern architecture should take. Expressionist architects like M. de Klerk and P.J. Kramer in Amsterdam (See Amsterdam School). Functionalist architects (Nieuwe Zakelijkheid or Nieuwe Bouwen) like Mart Stam, L. C. van der Vlugt, Willem Marinus Dudok and Johannes Duiker had good ties with the international modernist group CIAM. A third group came out of the De Stijl movement, among them J. J. P. Oud and Gerrit Rietveld. Both architects later built in a functionalist style. During the 1950s and 1960s a new generation of architects like Aldo van Eyck, J.B. Bakema and Herman Hertzberger, known as the ‘Forum generation’ (named after a magazine titled Forum) formed a connection with international groups like Team 10. From the '80s to the present Rem Koolhaas and his Office for Metropolitan Architecture (OMA) became one of the leading world architects. With him, formed a new generation of Dutch architects working in a modernist tradition.

=== Literature ===
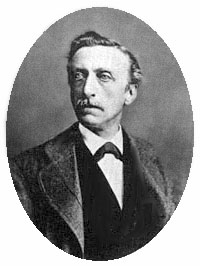
Eduard Douwes Dekker, also known as Multatuli

Some of the most important and internationally awarded writers are:

16th century:

- Desiderius Erasmus

17th century:

- Baruch de Spinoza
- Pieter Corneliszoon Hooft
- Joost van den Vondel

19th century:

- Multatuli

20th century:

- Louis Couperus
- Martinus Nijhoff
- Anne Frank
- Simon Vestdijk
- Willem Frederik Hermans
- Gerard Reve
- Hella Haasse
- Harry Mulisch
- Jan Wolkers
- Cees Nooteboom

=== Comic strips ===
The Dutch have a distinct comic book tradition as well. Although there is an abundance of Flemish, Franco-Belgian, and US comics, they also created their own. Examples are Secret agent 327 and Storm, written by Martin Lodewijk and Jack, Jacky and the Juniors by Jan Kruis, as well as cartoons with a more literary style, like Viking series Eric de Noorman by Hans G. Kresse and Tom Poes & Heer Bommel (Tom Puss/Oliver B. Bumble) created by Marten Toonder. The nation's love of football also translates into comics such as Roel Dijkstra and F.C. Knudde.

The children's comic book series Miffy (Dutch: Nijntje) by Dick Bruna has been published in over 50 languages, and predates the similarly drawn Hello Kitty by over ten years.

=== Music and dance ===
The Netherlands has diverse musical traditions, ranging from folk and dance to classical music and ballet. Traditional Dutch music is a genre known as levenslied, meaning 'song of life', to an extent comparable to French chanson or German schlager. These songs typically have a simple melody and rhythm, and a straightforward structure of couplets and refrains. Themes can be light, but are often sentimental and include love, death and loneliness. Traditional musical instruments such as the accordion and the barrel organ are a staple of levenslied music, though in recent years, many artists also use synthesizers and guitars. Artists in this genre include Jan Smit, Frans Bauer and the late André Hazes.

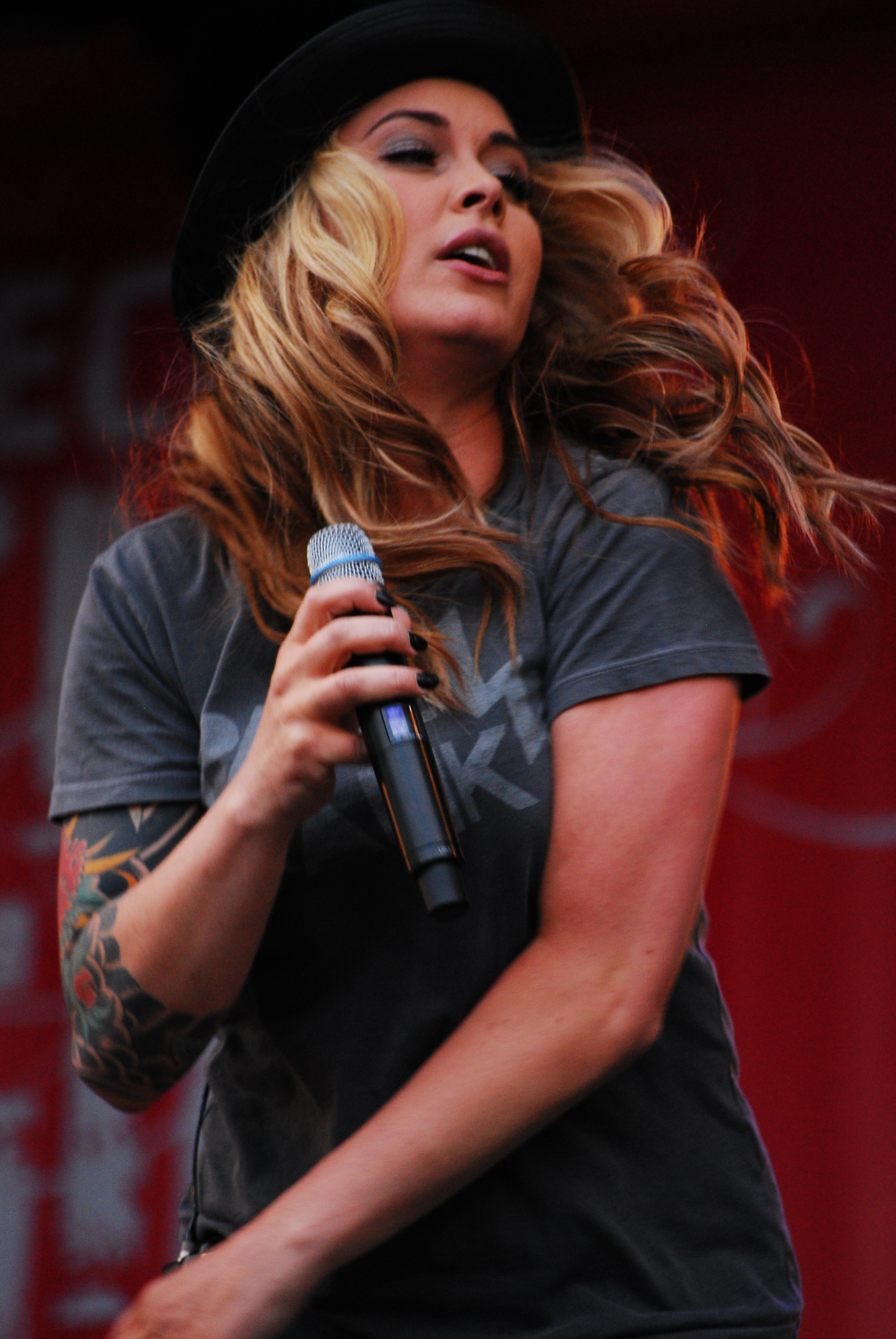
Rock singer Anouk at Festival Mundial in 2008

More than most other non-English speaking European countries, the Netherlands has remained closely in tune with US and British trends since the 1950s. Contemporary Dutch rock and pop music (Nederpop) originated in the 1960s, heavily influenced by popular music from the USA and Britain. In the 1960s and 1970s, the lyrics were mostly in English, and some tracks were instrumental. Bands such as Shocking Blue, (the) Golden Earring and Focus enjoyed international success. As of the 1980s, more and more pop musicians started working in the Dutch language, partly inspired by the huge success of the band Doe Maar. Today, Dutch rock and pop music thrives in both languages, with some artists recording in both.
Current symphonic metal bands Epica and Within Temptation, as well as jazz/pop singer Caro Emerald are having some international success. Contemporary local icons include rock singer Anouk, country pop singer Ilse DeLange, rock band Kane and Dutch-language duo Nick & Simon.

Early 1990s Dutch and Belgian house music came together in Eurodance project 2 Unlimited. Selling 18 million records, the two singers in the band are the most successful Dutch music artists to this day. Tracks like "Get Ready for This" are still popular themes of U.S. sports events, like the NHL. In the mid 1990s Dutch language rap and hip-hop (Nederhop) also came to maturation and has become popular in the Netherlands and Belgium. In the 21st century, artists with North African, Caribbean and Middle Eastern origins have profoundly influenced this genre.

Since the 1990s, Dutch electronic dance music (EDM) has conquered the world in many forms, from trance, techno and gabber to hardstyle. Some of the world's best dance music DJs hail from the Netherlands, including Armin van Buuren, Tiësto, Hardwell, Martin Garrix and Afrojack; the first four of which have been ranked as best in the world by DJ Mag Top 100 DJs. The Amsterdam dance event (ADE) is the world's leading electronic music conference and the biggest club festival for the many electronic subgenres on the planet. These artists also contribute significantly to the mainstream pop music played over the airwaves all around the world, as they frequently collaborate and produce for many notable artists.

In classical music, Jan Sweelinck ranks as the Netherlands' most famous composer, with Louis Andriessen amongst the best-known living Dutch classical composers. Celebrated Dutch conductors, past and present, include Willem Mengelberg, Eduard van Beinum, Bernard Haitink, Jac van Steen and Jaap van Zweden. Notable violinists are Janine Jansen and André Rieu. The latter, together with his Johann Strauss Orchestra, has taken classical and waltz music on worldwide concert tours, the size and revenue of which are otherwise only seen from the world's biggest rock and pop music acts. Acclaimed harpist Lavinia Meijer in 2012 released an album of works by Philip Glass that she transcribed for harp, with the approval of the composer. The Concertgebouw (completed in 1888) in Amsterdam is home to the Royal Concertgebouw Orchestra, considered one of the world's finest orchestras and on occasion voted the best of all.

Aruba and the five main islands of the Netherlands Antilles are part of the Lesser Antilles island chain. Their music is a mixture of native, African and Dutch elements, and is closely connected with trends from neighbouring islands like Barbados, Martinique, Trinidad and Tobago and Guadeloupe, as well as the mainland former Dutch possession of Suriname, which has exported kaseko music to great success on the islands. Curaçao and Bonaire likely have the most active and well-known music scenes. Curaçao is known for a kind of music called tumba, which is named after the conga drums that accompany it.

=== Cabaret ===
The Dutch also have their own distinct version of cabaret, with overarching themes and aimed at provoking thought, and sometimes sentiment, as well as laughs. This is exemplified in performers such as Wim Kan and Toon Hermans in the 1960s and 1970s and later diversified into a rich culture with artists such as Youp van 't Hek, Freek de Jonge, Herman van Veen, Theo Maassen, Claudia de Breij, Dolf Jansen, Brigitte Kaandorp, Hans Teeuwen and Herman Finkers.

=== Film ===
Some Dutch films – mainly by director Paul Verhoeven – have received international distribution and recognition, such as Turkish Delight ("Turks Fruit") (1973), Soldier of Orange ("Soldaat van Oranje") (1975), Spetters (1980) and The Fourth Man ("De Vierde Man") (1983). Verhoeven then went on to direct big Hollywood films like RoboCop and Basic Instinct, and returned with Dutch film Black Book in 2006.

Other well-known Dutch film directors are Jan de Bont (Speed), Dick Maas (De Lift), Fons Rademakers (The Assault), documentary maker Bert Haanstra and Joris Ivens. Film director Theo van Gogh achieved international notoriety in 2004 when he was murdered in the streets of Amsterdam.

Internationally successful Dutch actors include Famke Janssen (X-Men films), Carice van Houten (Game of Thrones), Rutger Hauer (Blade Runner), Jeroen Krabbé and Derek de Lint.

=== Radio and television ===
The Netherlands has a well-developed radio and television market, with both multiple commercial and non-commercial broadcasters. Imported TV programmes, as well as interviews with responses in a foreign language, are virtually always shown with the original sound, and subtitled. The only exception are shows for children.

TV exports from the Netherlands mostly take the form of specific formats and franchises, most notably through internationally active TV production conglomerate Endemol, founded by Dutch media tycoons John de Mol and Joop van den Ende. Headquartered in Amsterdam, Endemol has around 90 companies in over 30 countries. Endemol and its subsidiaries create and run reality, talent, and game show franchises worldwide, including Big Brother, Deal or No Deal, 1 vs. 100 and The Voice.

Two of the biggest annual Dutch radio events are 3FM Serious Request and the Top 2000 — both multi-day round-the-clock national broadcasting events in the month of December, supported by other media. They both have over half of the population of the Netherlands listening to the broadcasts each year.

Serious Request is a Red Cross fundraiser, held the week before Christmas on pop music station 3FM, and has grown to become an international franchise adopted by eight other countries.

The Top 2000 is an integral broadcast of the 2,000 most popular songs of all time on station Radio 2 from noon 25 December Christmas Day through midnight of New Year's Eve.

== Lifestyle ==
=== Spatial management ===
The Netherlands is densely populated and just under one-third of its territory lies below sea level and has to be defended from nature. This has led to a rational and collective approach to spatial planning, and particularly to water management.

In urban planning, this is seen in:

- the retention in some cities of the public ownership of most land through the ground rent (erfpacht) system, which facilitates comprehensive development and socialises increases in land prices;
- the widespread provision of social housing through housing associations, mixed with private ownership;
- rational mobility, including a dense railway network and, since the 1970s, the world's best cycling infrastructure. Almost everybody cycles as a matter of course, and cycling has a modal share of 27% of all trips (urban and rural) nationwide.

The Dutch also minimise ostentatious displays of status and wealth difference, and have a low power distance. They accept the need to follow rules, but combine this with tolerance of difference and respect for privacy.

As the country's watery geography dictates, that the Netherlands has a strong nautical culture.

=== Traditions ===
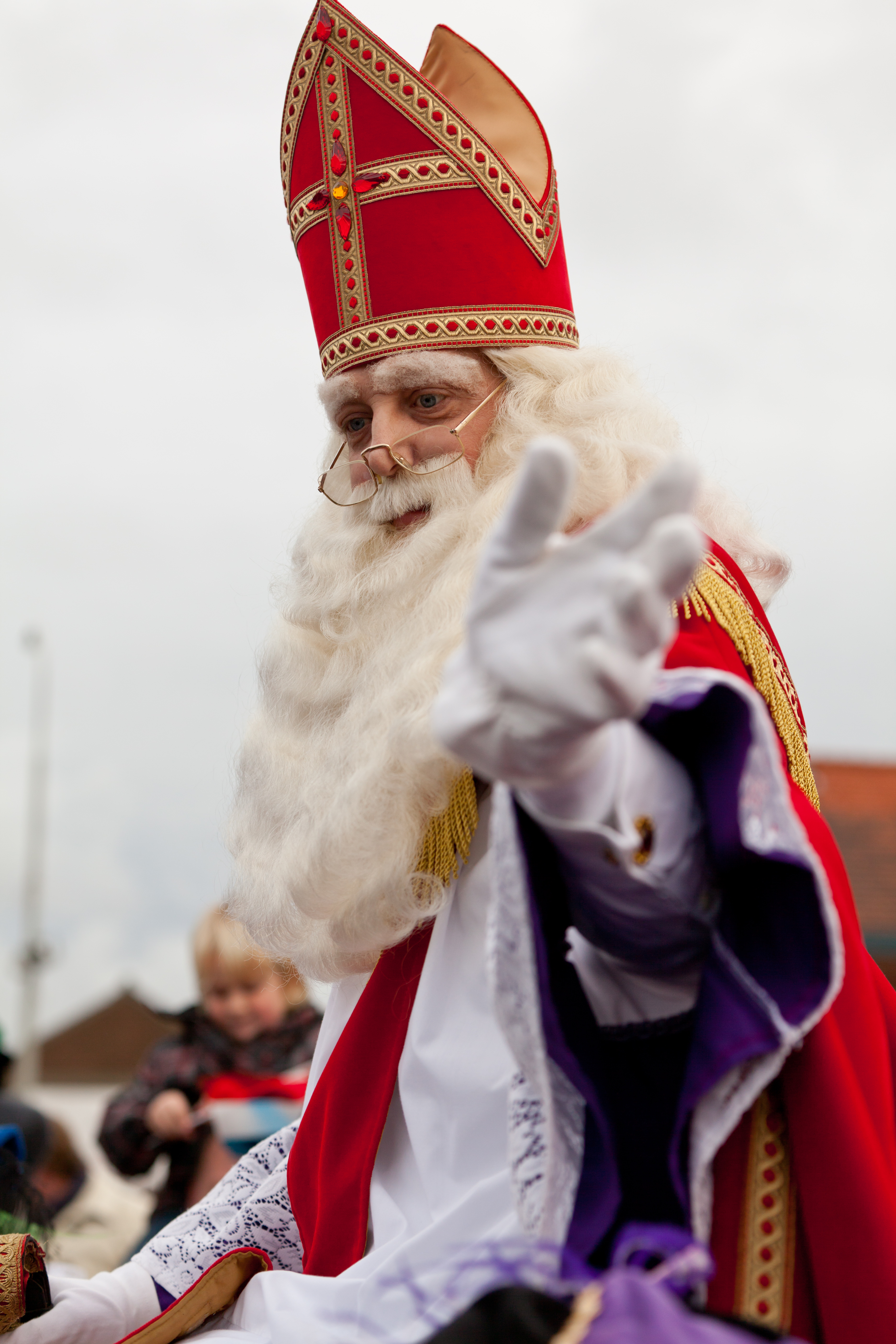
The Dutch St. Nicholas

A prime traditional festivity in the Netherlands is Sint Nicolaas or Sinterklaas. It is celebrated on the evening before Sinterklaas' birthday on 5 December, especially in families with little children. Sinterklaas has a companion known as Zwarte Piet, which in recent years has come under scrutiny in light of accusations of racist caricatures. In the United States the original figure of Dutch Sinterklaas has merged with Father Christmas into Santa Claus. In the Netherlands, gift-bringing at Christmas has in recent decades gained some popularity too, although Sinterklaas is much more popular.

The national holiday is celebrated on 27 April with King's Day (Koningsdag) in honour of the King's birthday. The day is moved up to Saturday if it would otherwise happen on a Sunday. The day is known for its nationwide vrijmarkt ("free market"), at which many Dutch sell their secondhand items. It is also an opportunity for "orange madness" or oranjegekte, for the national colour, when the normally strait-laced Dutch let down their hair, often dyed orange for the occasion.

World Animal Day has been observed since 1929, primarily by the children of the Netherlands. It is as well known as Mother's and Father's Day.

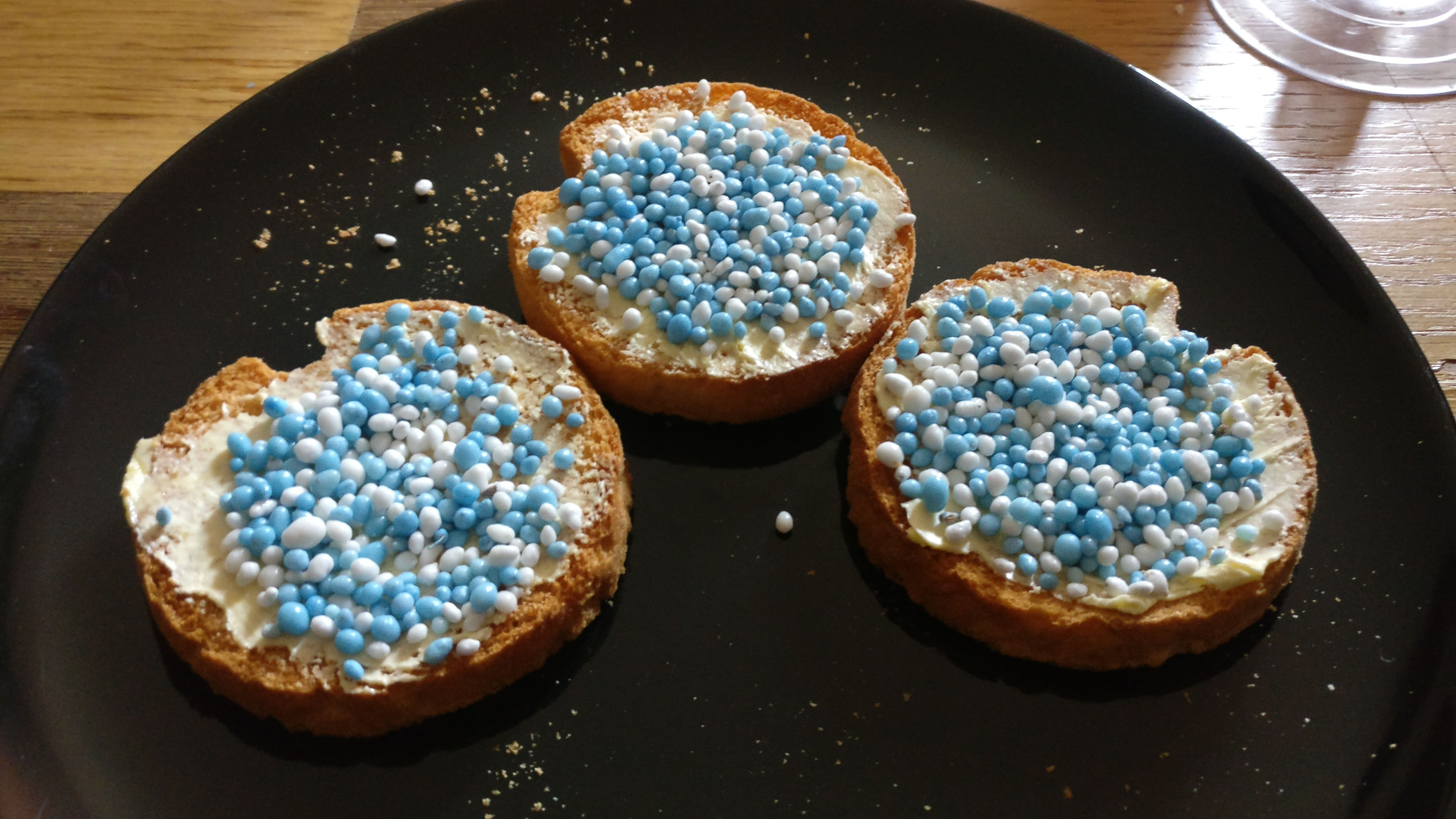
Beschuit with muisjes topping, blue for a boy

A widespread tradition is that of serving beschuit met muisjes when people come to visit a new-born baby and its mother. Beschuit is a typical Dutch type of biscuit, muisjes are sugared anise seeds. Blue muisjes are used for a baby boy, and pink muisjes are used for a baby girl.

More regional traditions include the huge Easter Fires or celebrating Sint Maarten on the evening of 11 November when children go door to door with paper lanterns and candles, and sing songs in return for a treat. This holiday is celebrated in some parts of Groningen, North Holland and the southern and middle part of Limburg and to a lesser extent in South Holland and Zeeland. This celebration marks the beginning of the dark period before Christmas and the long days of winter. The same thing happens on 6 January with Epiphany in some areas in the Catholic south of the Netherlands. In the past, home-made lanterns were used, made from a hollowed out sugar beet. In North Brabant, Limburg and some other parts of the Netherlands people celebrate Carnaval similar to the carnival of the German Rhineland and Belgium Flanders.

=== Cuisine ===
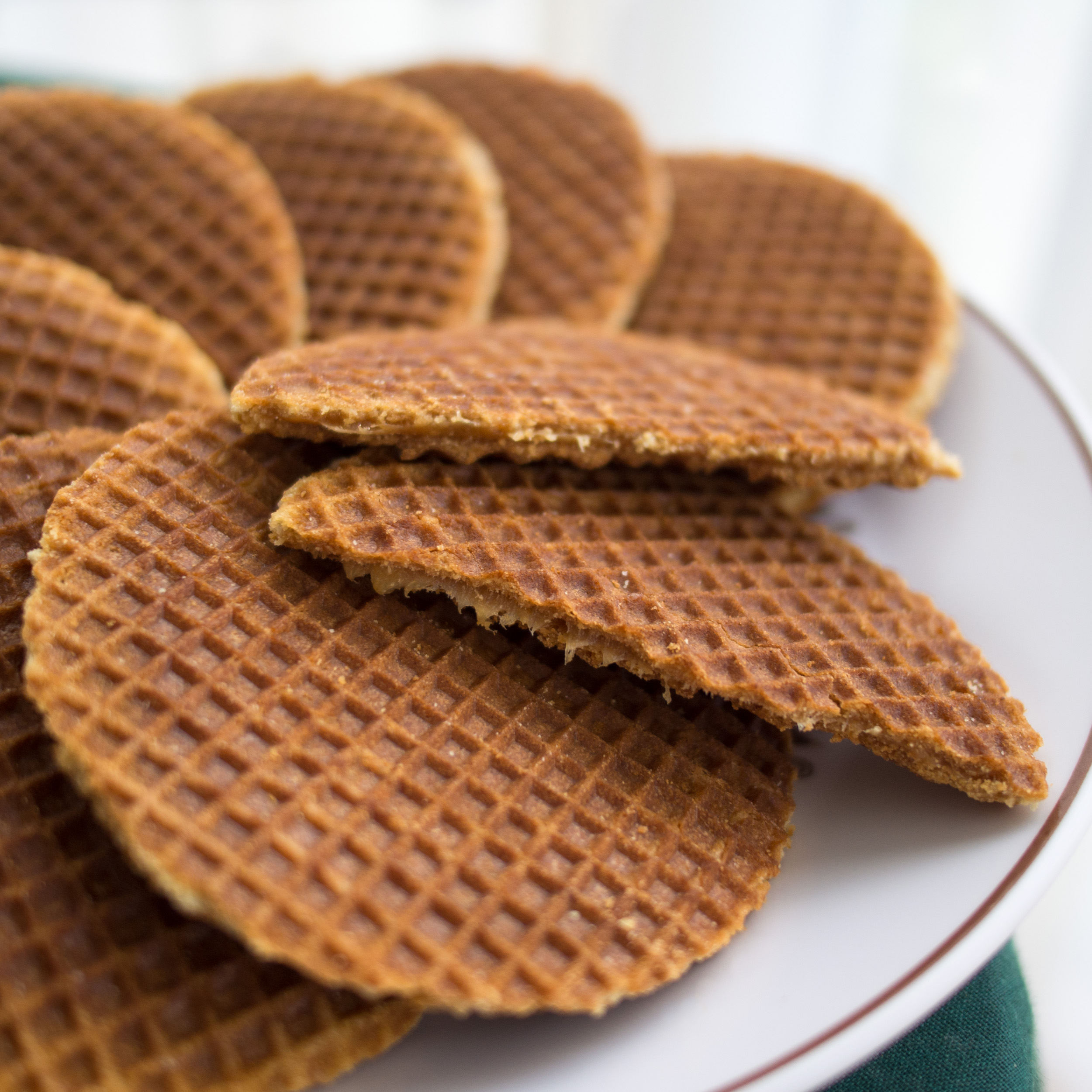
Stroopwafels (syrup waffles) are a treat consisting of waffles with caramel-like syrup filling in the middle.

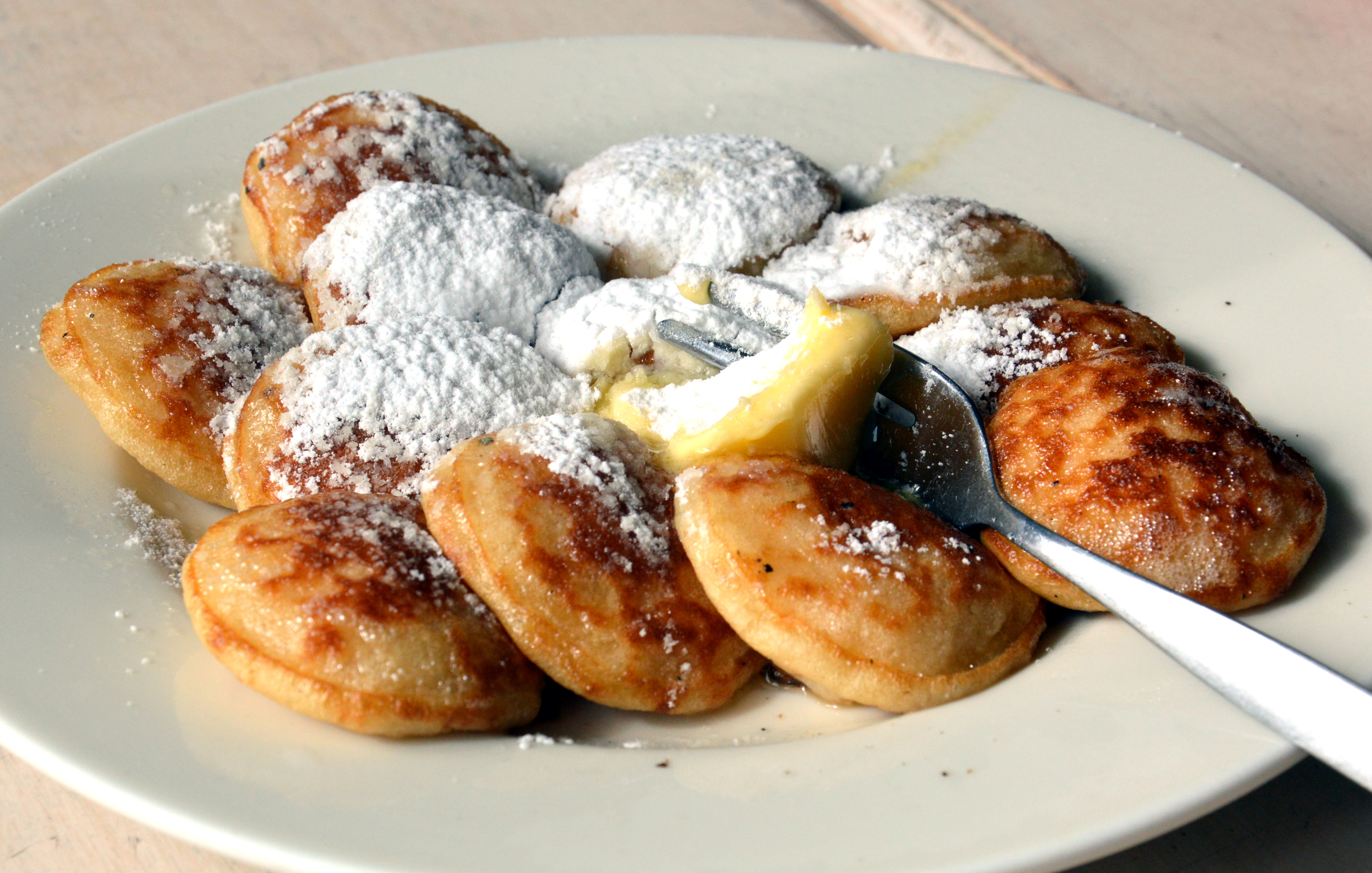
Poffertjes are made in a special, so-called, poffertjespan.

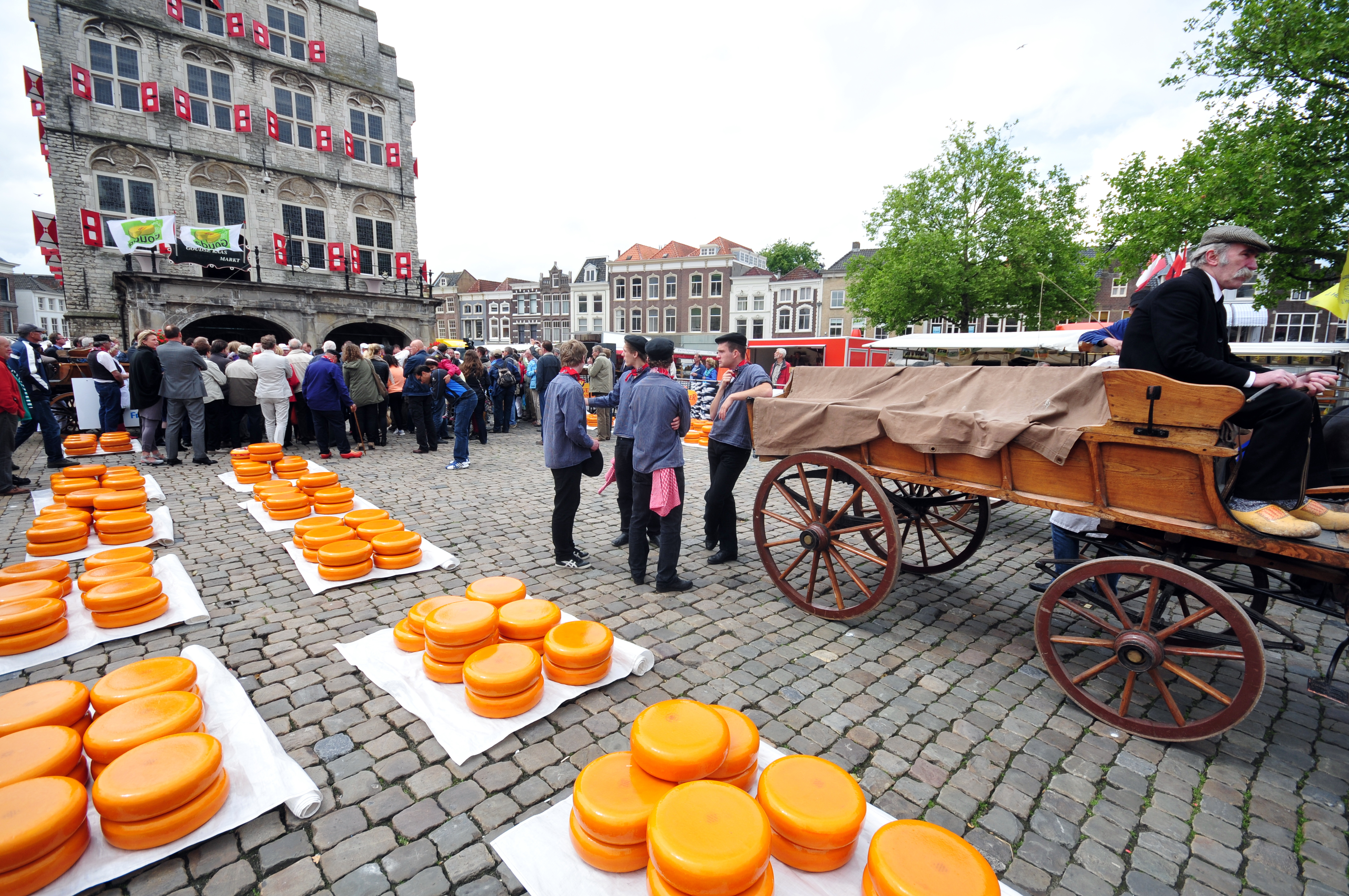
The Gouda cheese market.

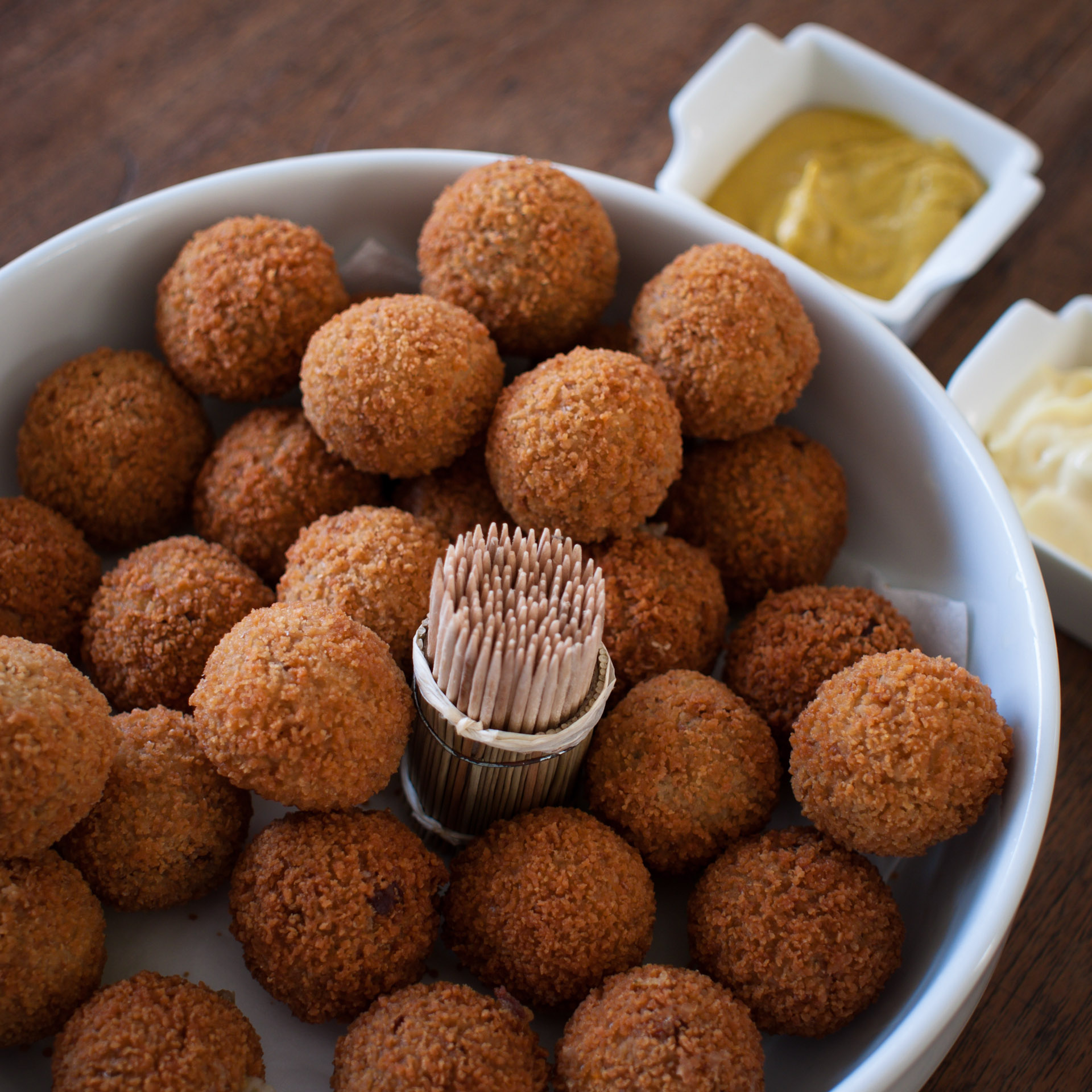
Bitterballen are usually served with mustard.

Dutch cuisine is characterized by its somewhat limited diversity; however, it varies greatly from region to region. The southern regions of the Netherlands, for example, share dishes with Flanders and vice versa. The Southern Dutch cuisine is the only Dutch culinary region which developed an haute cuisine, as it is influenced by both German cuisine and French cuisine, and it forms the base of most traditional Dutch restaurants. Dutch food is traditionally characterized by the high consumption of vegetables when compared to the consumption of meat. Dairy products are also eaten to great extent, Dutch cheeses are world-renowned with famous cheeses such as Gouda, Edam and Leiden. Dutch pastry is extremely rich and is eaten in great quantities. When it comes to alcoholic beverages wine has long been absent in Dutch cuisine (but this is changing during the last decades); traditionally there are many brands of beer and strong alcoholic spirits such as jenever and brandewijn. The Dutch have all sorts of pastry and cookies (the word "cookie" is in fact derived from Dutch), many of them filled with marzipan, almond and chocolate. A truly huge amount of different pies and cakes can be found, most notably in the southern provinces, especially the so-called Limburgish vlaai.

=== Sports ===
Football is the most popular sport in the Netherlands. Notable Dutch football teams and clubs include: Amsterdamsche Football club Ajax in 1900, Feyenoord Rotterdam in 1908 and PSV Eindhoven in 1913.

Another almost national sport is speedskating. It is common for Northern Dutch children to learn how to skate at an early age. Long distance skating and all-round tournaments are the most popular and most successful areas for the Dutch. In the history of the world championships the champion of the 10 km has always been a Dutchman. Notable athletes are Sven Kramer, Rintje Ritsma and Ard Schenk.

Also popular are swimming, field hockey, judo and cycling.

A typical Dutch sport is "korfball", a mixed sport played by girls and boys. The sport was invented in the Netherlands, but is now also played in countries such as Belgium, Germany and Japan. At the IKF Korfball World Championship the Dutch team has won in all cases except once.

== See also ==
- Calvinism
- Dutch customs and etiquette
- Dutch people
- HowNutsAreTheDutch
- List of Dutch people
- Atheism
