= Fourth Man =

Fourth Man or variant may refer to:

- "The Fourth Man", an Agatha Christie short story first published in 1933
- De vierde man (The Fourth Man), a 1981 Dutch novel
  - The Fourth Man (1983 film), a Dutch film directed by Paul Verhoeven based on the novel
- The Fourth Man (2007 film), a Serbian film directed by Dejan Zečević
- A character in the Planetary comic book series. See List of Planetary characters#Elijah Snow

== See also ==
- 4 Man, officiating method used in hockey
