= NedWeb =

- Website type: Bibliographical database
- Available in: Dutch, German, English
- Owner: University of Vienna
- Creator: Department of Netherlandic Studies
- Website: nedweb.univie.ac.at
- Registration: No
- Launched: 1996
- Current status: Archived / Inactive

The NedWeb project is a cultural documentation centre, with an online database, an initiative of the Department of Dutch Language Studies ("Netherlandistics") at the University of Vienna.

It contains documentation on Dutch literature, Dutch language and Dutch culture. Its aim is to promote literature and a broader public understanding of Dutch and Flemish culture.
