= Zulte =

- Municipality
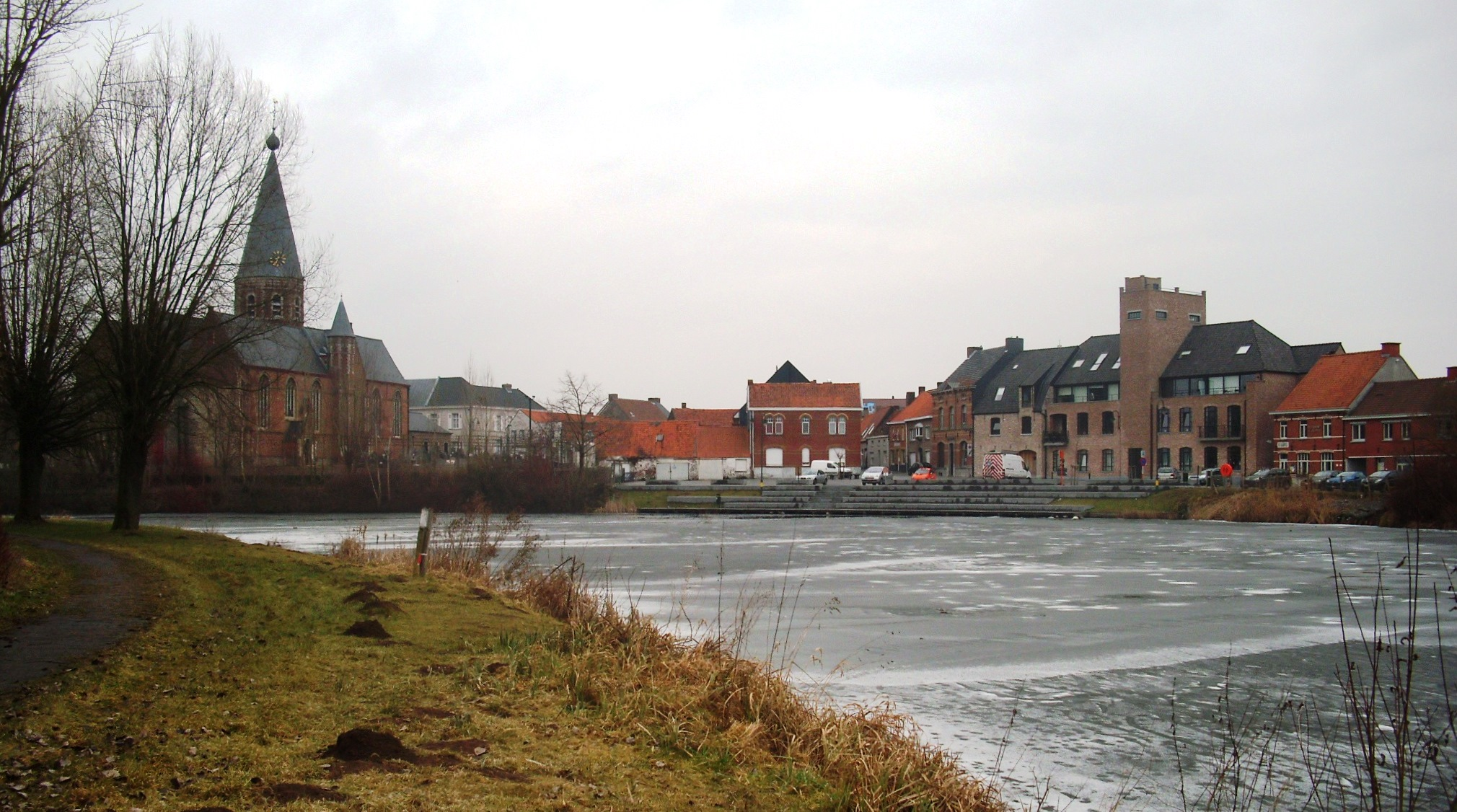

- Flag Coat of arms

- Location of Zulte in East Flanders
- Interactive map of Zulte
- Location in Belgium
- Coordinates: 50°55′N 03°26′E
- Country: Belgium
- Community: Flemish Community
- Region: Flemish Region
- Province: East Flanders
- Arrondissement: Ghent

Government
  - Mayor: Simon Lagrange (Open Zulte)
  - Governing parties: Open Zulte, GVZ, N-VA

Area
  - Total: 32.76 km^{2} (12.65 sq mi)

Population (2018-01-01)
  - Total: 15,720
  - Density: 479.9/km^{2} (1,243/sq mi)
- Postal codes: 9870
- NIS code: 44081
- Area codes: 09
- Website: www.zulte.be

Zulte (Dutch pronunciation: [ˈzʏltə]) is a Belgian municipality located in Flanders and in the Flemish province of East Flanders. The municipality comprises the towns of Machelen, Olsene and Zulte proper. In 2021, Zulte had a total population of 15,843. The total area is 32.52 km^{2}.

The town had its own beer from 1891 (simply called Zulte) but today they are part of Alken-Maes breweries. The main football club from Zulte merged with KSV Waregem to form a team called SV Zulte Waregem that plays in the Belgian Pro League.

== Famous inhabitants ==
- Roger Raveel, painter
- Gerard Reve, Dutch writer
