= Machelen, Zulte =

Machelen
- Village
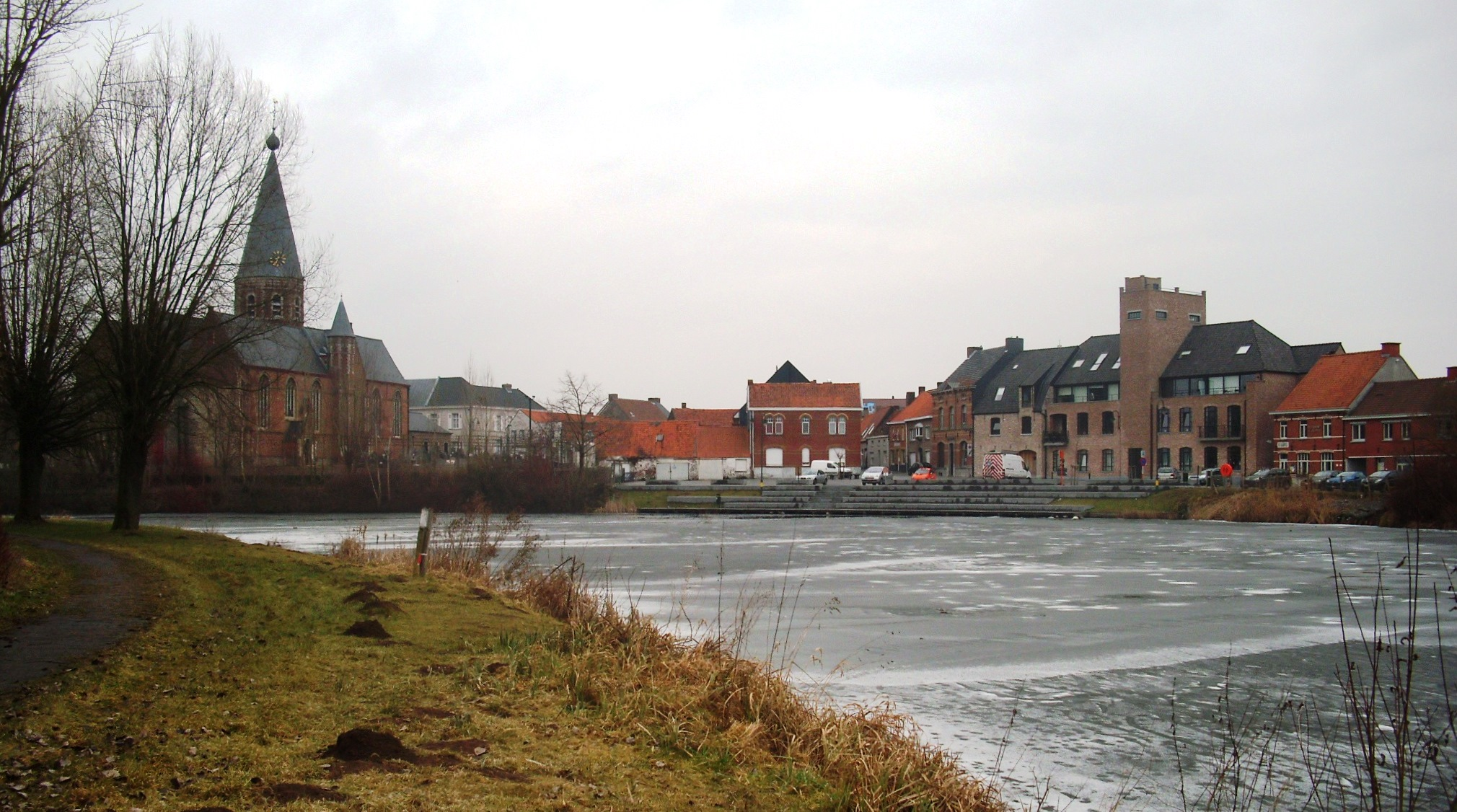
- View of centre of Machelen

- Location in Belgium
- Coordinates: 50°57′34″N 3°29′10″E
- Country: Belgium
- Region: Flemish Region
- Province: East Flanders
- Municipality: Zulte

Area
  - Total: 12.74 km^{2} (4.92 sq mi)

Population (1981)
  - Total: 3,123
  - Density: 245.1/km^{2} (634.9/sq mi)
- Time zone: CET

Machelen, or in full Machelen-aan-de-Leie, is a village in the municipality of Zulte in the province of East Flanders of Belgium. It was the hometown of the painter Roger Raveel.

== History ==
Machelen was first mentioned in 697 as Machlinio. In the 11th century, the village belonged to the Lords of Oudenaarde. The Sint-Michiel-en-Cornelius-en-Ghislenus Church was first mentioned in 1163. In the 17th century, the church became a site of pilgrimage and was greatly extended. In 1914, the tower which was damaged in the 19th century, was repaired, only to be destroyed again in 1918. It was subsequently repaired in 1920.

Machelen was an independent municipality until 1977 when it merged into Zulte. The Roger Raveel Museum is located in the village.

== Notable people ==
- Roger Raveel (1921–2013), Flemish painter associated with pop art.
- Gerard Reve (1923–2006), Dutch author who lived and was buried in Machelen.
