= Margriet Kemper =

Dutch sculptor and painter (born 1951)

- Born: Christine Wilhelmina Margaretha Kemper; 10 August 1951 (age 75); Bandung
- Education: Academie Minerva, Academie voor Kunst en Vormgeving St. Joost

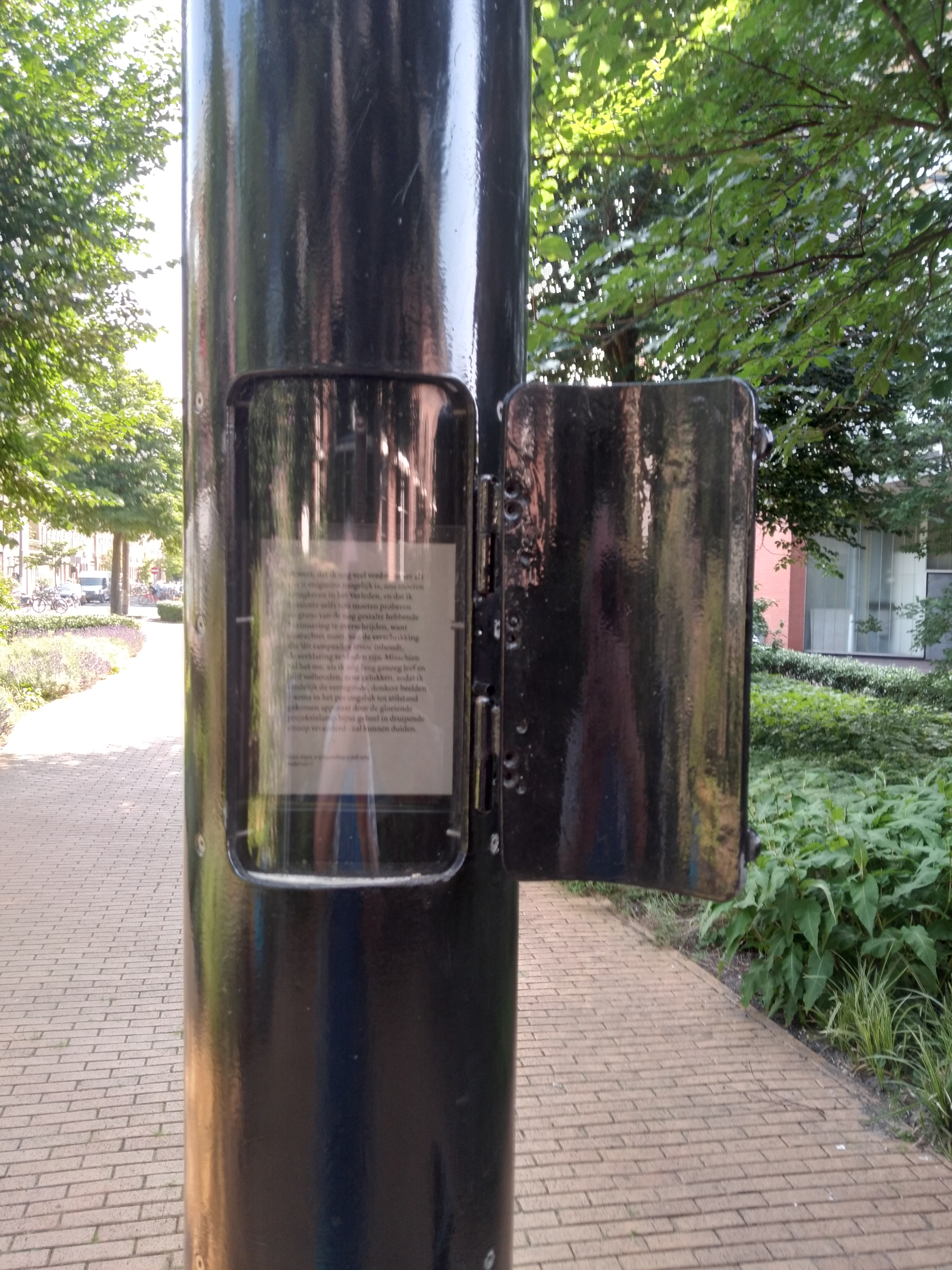
Memorial to Gerard Reve on the Waterspiegelplein, Amsterdam (2006)

Christine Wilhelmina Margaretha "Margriet" Kemper (born 10 August 1951) is a Dutch sculptor and painter. She works mainly on artworks in the public space, including a memorial to the novelist Gerard Reve in Amsterdam.

== Life ==
Kemper was born in Bandung. She studied at Academie Minerva in Groningen from 1976 to 1979, and then until 1981 at the Academie voor Kunst en Vormgeving St. Joost in 's-Hertogenbosch. Nine years later she returned there as a teacher. She taught at St. Joost up to and including 2011.

== Work ==
In the 1980s Kemper took part in exhibitions. In the following decade she stopped making art for a time. She later became better known for works in public space and for her contributions to art events in the landscape, in which she combined nature, language and objects. In 2011 she helped organise the Landkunst event in Het Groene Woud.

=== Public space ===
In 1986 her Betonnen tafel met servies (Concrete table with crockery) was placed in a courtyard of the then new building of the Vakschool in Wageningen: a concrete table of about three by one metres, laden with concrete plates, bowls and other catering ware. When the school moved in 2020, the work was given a place on the terrace behind the school building.

Boom en bank (Tree and bench, 1998) in Bergen op Zoom is an aluminium bench of unusual dimensions under a plane tree that was then 45 years old; its backrest carries the words Alles wacht op betekenis (Everything waits for meaning). It was regarded as the most fitting expression of the theme ontmoetingen (encounters) within the communicatie (communication) masterplan, which provided for five artworks in the then newly built district of De Bergse Plaat. The Beelden Binnenschelde Foundation handed the work over to the municipality on 9 October 1999.

In October 2006 the Westerpark borough of Amsterdam announced that Kemper would make the memorial to Gerard Reve near the house where he was born. Her design consisted of a long wooden bench set in a tall privet hedge, facing that house, and a black street lamp with warm yellow light. Behind three small hatches in the lamp would be a quotation from Nader tot U (Nearer to Thee), a photograph of Reve by Rineke Dijkstra and an image of the house where he was born. According to borough official Dick Jansen, it was a fine and restrained design. The Amsterdams Fonds voor de Kunst (Amsterdam Fund for the Arts) turned down a request for €17,500 in support; its director, Andries Mulder, considered the design insufficiently interesting in artistic content ("artistiek-inhoudelijk").

In the fortified town of Heusden, Kemper designed Het delen van de tijd (The sharing of time), an hourglass on a bluestone plinth on the Zuiderbolwerk bastion. It arose from a request by veterans in 2012 for a place to commemorate their missions; on the advice of the municipal art advisory committee it became a memorial for everyone. The unveiling was planned for Veterans' Day on 4 October 2014.

=== Other work ===
In 1999 Kemper began SOON with Mieke van Schaijk, and later with HW Werther: a series of stamp albums filled with small drawings. From 2015 she and Werther made the La&Mo teachings on YouTube, instruction videos with titles such as How to evoke absence. In 2020 her collection of four hundred pattern cards, white postcard-sized cards on which she drew colourful patterns, was shown at De Ketelfactory in Schiedam. That year she wrote a short weekly piece on her blog De vos op maandag (The fox on Monday).

== Publishing ==
In January 2008 Kemper and Gerard Pels founded the publishing house Pels & Kemper in 's-Hertogenbosch. Pels knew the book market; Kemper, who at the time mainly designed for public space, supplied the ideas and the content. The first titles were a new edition of Tubutsch by Albert Ehrenstein with new linocuts by the 's-Hertogenbosch artist Peter Koene, and Trifle by Helen Saberi and Alan Davidson, which Kemper translated with Augusta Plochg. After a few years she stopped publishing.

== Theatre ==
With Froukje Reitsema, Kemper made the show Elkaars andere (Each other's other), about how a family with roots in the Dutch East Indies and a family from Groningen got to know each other after becoming neighbours in Leeuwarden; Kemper and Reitsema were neighbours there as girls. The show was programmed, among other dates, in October 2024 by the Friesland branch of Vrouwen van Nu and in March 2025, in Frisian and Dutch, in Bodegraven. In 2026 it was followed by Lees mij, zei de brief (Read me, said the letter), a show about letters.

== Gallery ==
Sculpture on the Maliebaan in Utrecht, placed in 1992

Het delen van de tijd, a general memorial in Heusden

Punt en ruimte (Point and space) at the entrance to the De Schalm business park in Andelst
