= Gerard Reve =

Dutch writer (1923–2006)

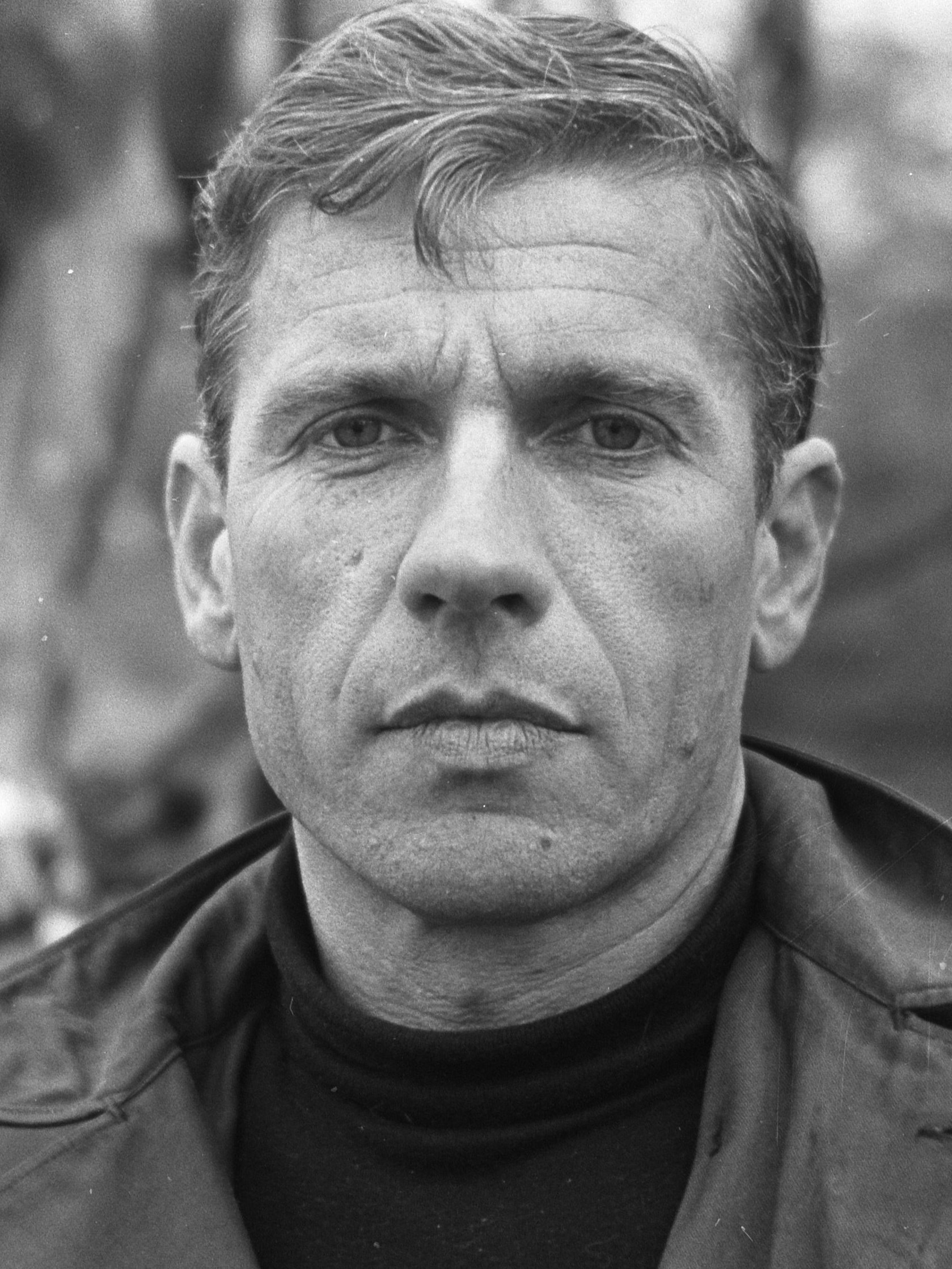
- Gerard Reve in 1969
- Born: Gerard Kornelis van het Reve; 14 December 1923; Amsterdam, Netherlands
- Died: 8 April 2006 (aged 82); Zulte, East Flanders, Belgium
- Resting place: Sint-Michiel-en-Cornelius-en-Ghislenuskerk, Machelen
- Education: Vossius Gymnasium; Grafische School
- Occupation: Writer
- Spouse: Hanny Michaelis (m. 1948 – sep. 1959)
- Partner: Joop Schafthuizen
- Relatives: Karel van het Reve (brother)
- Writing career
- Pen name: Simon van het Reve
- Language: Dutch
- Years active: 1947–1998
- Genres: Novels, short stories, poems, letters, speeches
- Notable awards: Prijs der Nederlandse Letteren

Gerard Kornelis van het Reve (14 December 1923 – 8 April 2006) was a Dutch writer. He started writing as Simon Gerard van het Reve and adopted the shorter Gerard Reve (Dutch: [ˈɣeːrɑrt ˈreːvə]) in 1973. Together with Willem Frederik Hermans and Harry Mulisch, he is considered one of the "Great Three" (De Grote Drie) of Dutch post-war literature. His 1981 novel De vierde man (The Fourth Man) was the basis for Paul Verhoeven's 1983 film.

Reve was one of the first homosexual authors to come out in the Netherlands. He often wrote explicitly about erotic attraction, sexual relations and intercourse between men, which many readers considered shocking. However, he did this in an ironic, humorous and recognizable way, which contributed to making homosexuality acceptable for many of his readers. Another main theme, often in combination with eroticism, was religion. Reve himself declared that the primary message in all of his work was salvation from the material world we live in.

Gerard Reve was born in Amsterdam, Netherlands, and was the brother of the Slavicist and essayist Karel van het Reve, who became a staunch anti-communist in his own way; the personal rapport between the brothers was not good. They broke off relations altogether in the 1980s.

== Themes ==
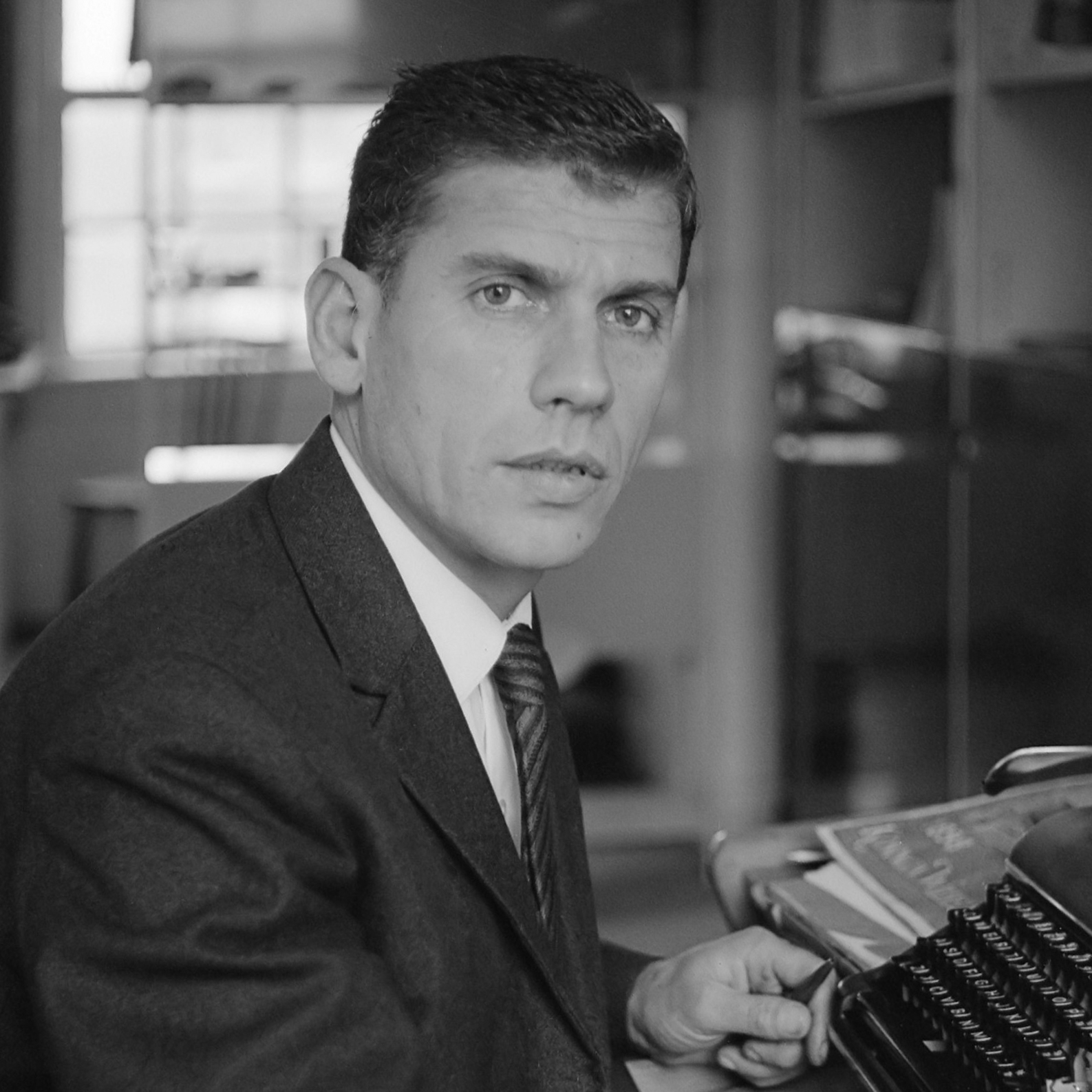
Reve in 1963

He often insisted that homosexuality was merely a motif (providing idiom – as Roman Catholicism based phrases would differ from e.g. Buddhist wording – and, over time, idiosyncratic Reve-slang) in his work, the deeper theme being the inadequacy of human love (as opposed to divine love). Since the publication of Op weg naar het einde (Towards the end) (1963) and Nader tot U (Nearer to Thee) (1966), marking his breakthrough to a large audience, he articulated his views on God's creation and human fate, especially in the many collections of letters that he published.

These writings stress a symbolic, rather than ("...only the blind...") literal, understanding of religious texts as the only intellectually acceptable one, and the irrelevance of the Gospel's historical truth. Religion, according to Reve, has nothing to do with the literal, the factual, the moral or the political. It has no quarrel with modern science, because religious truths and empirical facts are in different realms. The observable world has no meaning beyond comparing facts, and, while revelation may not make sense, it has meaning, and it is this meaning that Reve was after in everything he wrote. Philosophically, Reve was influenced by Arthur Schopenhauer, whose works he re-read every winter, and even more so by Carl Jung, according to a Dutch painter who spent some time with the author in France to paint several portraits of him.

Reve's erotic prose deals partly with his own sexuality, but aims at something more universal. Reve's work often depicts sexuality as ritual. Heavily influenced by French writer Marquis de Sade, many scenes bear a sado-masochistic character, but this is never meant as an end in itself. 'Revism', a term coined by him, can roughly be described as consecrating sexual acts of punishment, dedicating these acts to revered others, and, ultimately, to higher entities (God). This is again a quest for higher significance in a human act (sex) that is devoid of meaning in its material form.

== Style ==
His style combines the formal (in the kind of language one would find in a seventeenth-century Bible) with the colloquial, in a highly recognisable way. Similarly, his humour and often paradoxical view of the world relies on the contrast between exalted mysticism and common sense. The irony that pervades his work and his tendency towards extreme statements has caused confusion among readers. Many doubted the sincerity of his conversion to Catholicism, although Reve remained adamant about the truthfulness of his faith, claiming his right to individual notions about religion and his personal experience of it.

== International reception ==
The year 2016 saw Sam Garret's translation of Reve's debut, The Evenings. Although Reve was long thought to be untranslatable because of his stylistic brilliance, the work received critical acclaim throughout the English speaking world. Writing for The Guardian, Tim Parks opened his review as follows:

It is so rare, as a reviewer, to come across a novel that is not only a masterpiece but a cornerstone manque of modern European literature, that I hesitate before setting down a response: what can I say, in a world of hype, that will put this book where it belongs, in readers’ hands and minds?

== Controversies ==
Reve's literary career was marked by many controversies. Early on, the Dutch ministry of culture intervened when Reve was to receive a grant, citing the obscene nature of his work.

A member of the Dutch senate, the Calvinist senator Hendrik Algra, spoke on the same subject in a plenary debate. Reve sometimes welcomed the publicity, but also complained about his continual struggle with the authorities, public opinion and the press.

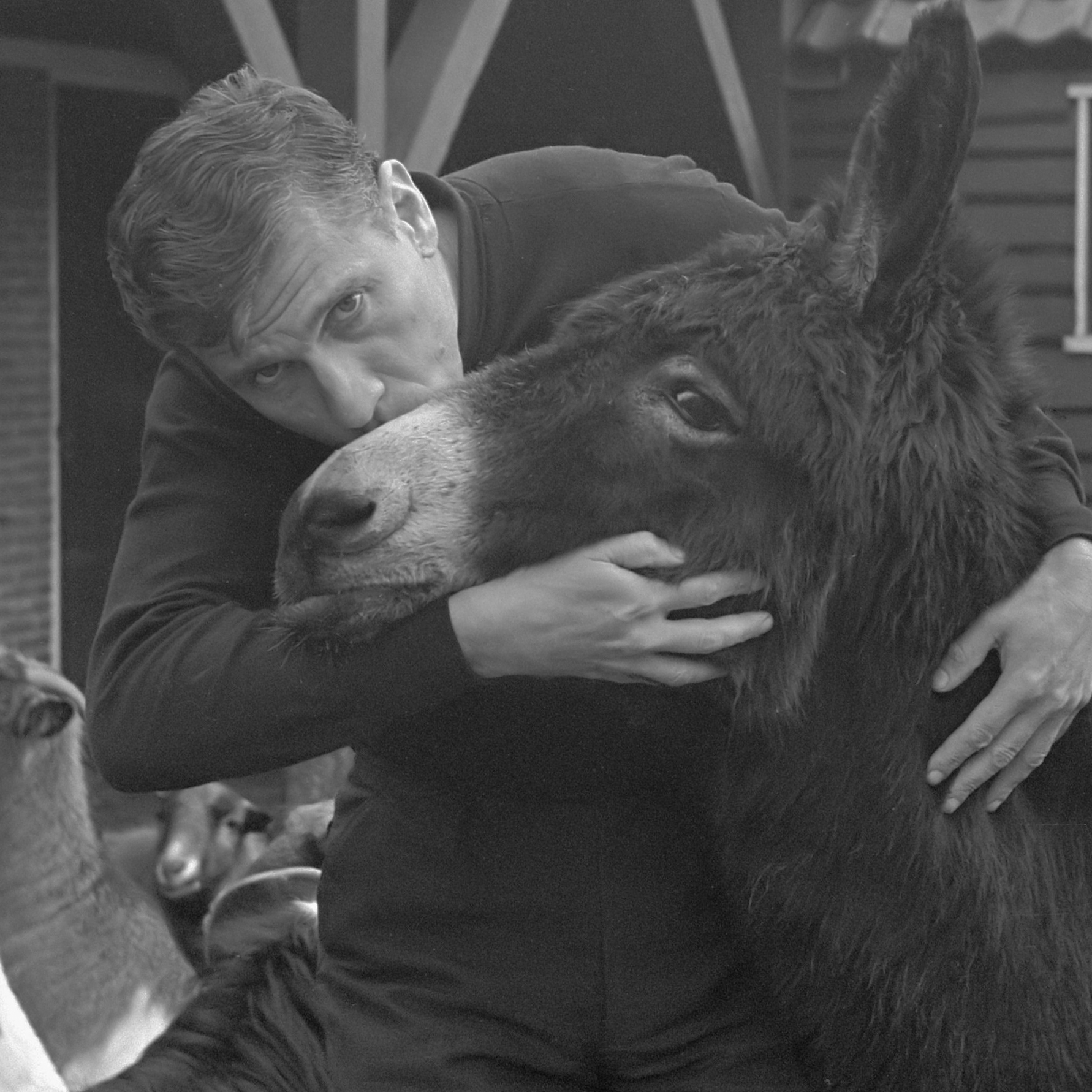
Gerard Kornelis van het Reve (1969)

Reve was prosecuted in 1966 for allegedly breaking a law against blasphemy. In Nader tot U he describes the narrator's love-making to God, a visitor to his house incarnated in a one-year-old mouse-grey donkey. In April 1968 he was acquitted by the Supreme Court. Although it would take decades for the Netherlands to decriminalize blasphemy, in 2013 the law was abolished, the outcome of this case — known as the “Donkey Trial” — rendered the existing law virtually obsolete

Reve came from a communist and atheistic family, but converted to Roman Catholicism. Although liturgically traditional, he took a liberal stance on Roman Catholic ethics. His ridiculing of some aspects of Catholicism led to tensions in the Dutch Roman Catholic community in the 1960s. Nevertheless, he contributed as a literary advisor to the translation of St. Paul's Epistle to the Romans within the larger context of the Dutch 'Willibrord Translation' of the Bible.

One of Reve's main themes, along with religion and love, is his intense hatred of communism, its regimes and the tolerance toward it in leftist circles in the Western world.

In 1975, he appeared at a Dutch poetry festival, wearing (among other things, a crucifix and peace symbol) a swastika as well as a hammer and sickle on his clothes, and read a poem that spoke of immigration in racist terms, though stressing cultural differences and using zwart (black) rather than neger/nikker (negro/nigger), in a solemn language that insulted many people, especially Afro-Surinamese, many of whom had arrived recently on the eve of the decolonization of Surinam that was to take place in November 1975.

This event led to much controversy, and many people have since wondered whether Reve had lost his mind, or had been alluding to something else. In the face of a wave of criticism Reve did not move an inch, and his claims of being 'too intelligent to be a racist' and never wanting to inflict any harm on any racial grounds partly got lost in the confusion generated by his ever-present irony.

Like WF Hermans, he invited controversy by visiting South Africa in 1984 in defiance of a cultural boycott that was declared on that country because of its apartheid policy.

In 2001, he was awarded the Prijs der Nederlandse Letteren, the most prestigious prize for Dutch-language authors, but King Albert II of Belgium refused to present it to him because his partner had been accused of pedophilia. The money was awarded by bank transfer and the certificate delivered.

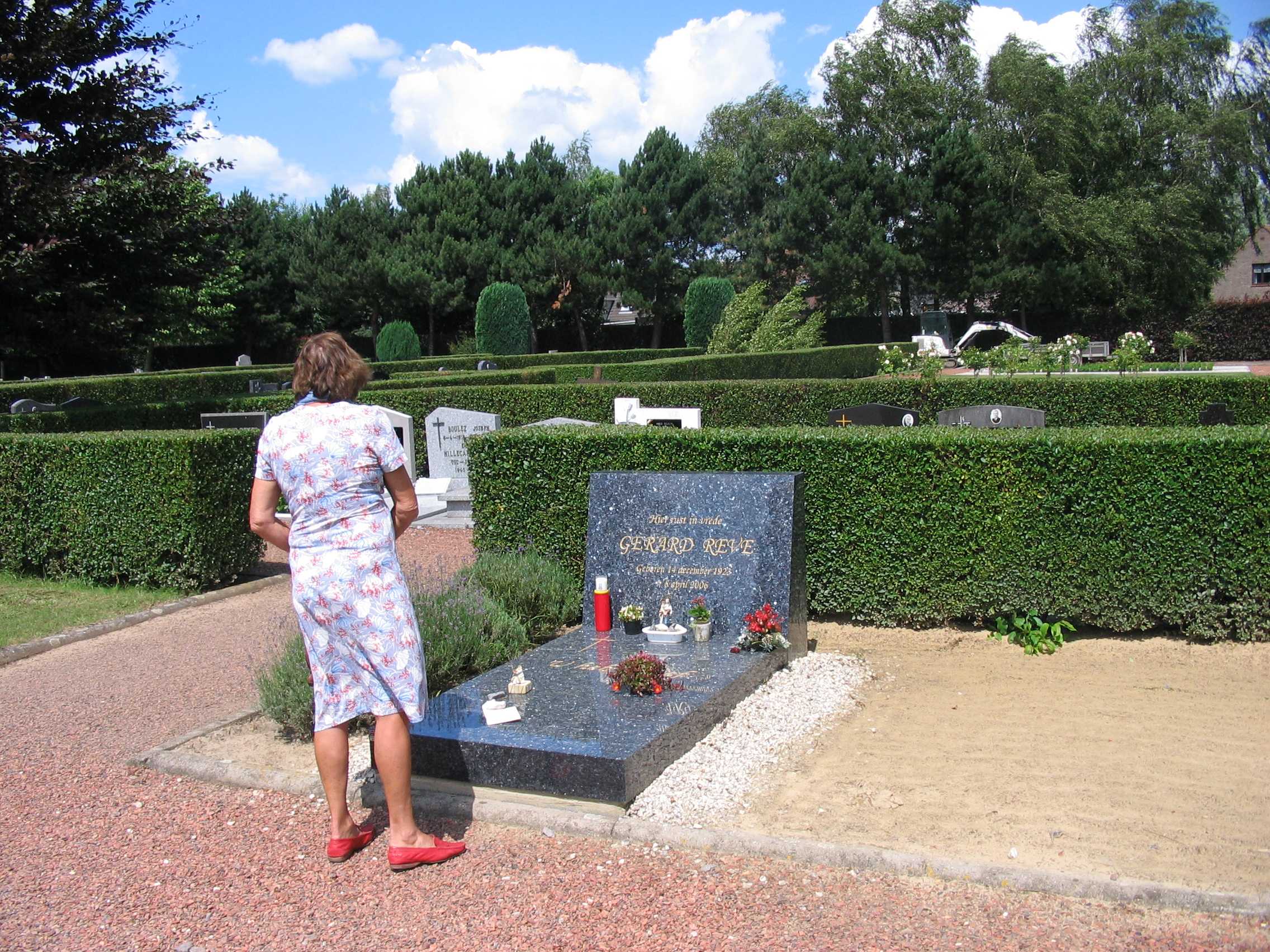
Reve's grave

During the last years of his life, he began to suffer from Alzheimer's disease, and he died of it, in Zulte, Belgium, on 8 April 2006 at the age of 82. Reve was buried on April 15 in the centre of the cemetery "Nieuwe Begraafplaats" in Machelen-aan-de-Leie.

== Honors ==
- 1947: Reina Prinsen Geerligs Award
- 2001: Prijs der Nederlandse Letteren

== Memorial ==
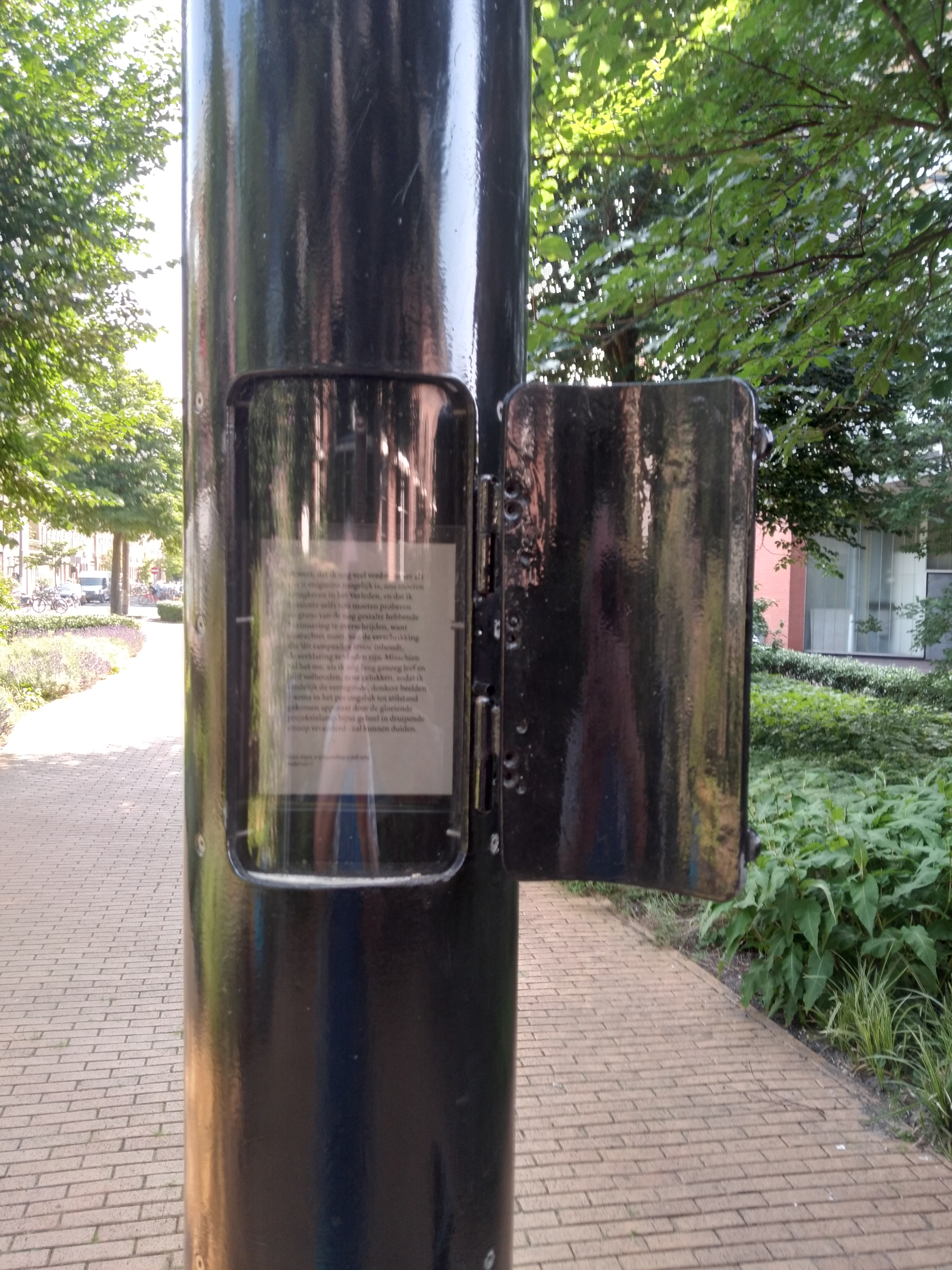
Memorial to Gerard Reve in Amsterdam

On 14 December 2006, Reve's birthday, the first memorial to the writer was unveiled on the Waterspiegelplein in the then borough of Westerpark in Amsterdam, opposite the house where he was born. In October 2006 the borough had announced that Margriet Kemper would make a memorial to Reve there. Her design consisted of a long wooden bench bordered by a tall privet hedge, facing that house, and a black street lamp with warm yellow light; behind three small hatches in the lamp would be a quotation from Nader tot U, a photograph of Reve by Rineke Dijkstra and an image of the house.

== Bibliography ==
- De Avonden (The evenings, 1947)
- Werther Nieland (1949)
- De ondergang van de familie Boslowits (The fall of the Boslowits family, 1950)
- Tien vrolijke verhalen (Ten happy stories, 1961)
- Vier Wintervertellingen (Four Winter Tales, 1963)
- Op weg naar het einde (Approaching the end, 1963)
- Nader tot U (Nearer to Thee, 1966)
- De taal der liefde (The language of love, 1972)
- Lieve jongens (Dear boys, 1973)
- Een circusjongen (A circus boy, 1975)
- Brieven aan kandidaat katholiek A. 1962–1969 (Letters to candidate Catholic A. 1962–1969, 1976)
- Oud en eenzaam (Old and lonely, 1978)
- Brieven aan Wimie (Letters to Wimie, 1980)
- Moeder en zoon (Mother and son, 1980)
- Brieven aan Bernard S. (Letters to Bernard S., 1981)
- De vierde man (The Fourth Man, 1981)
- Brieven aan Josine M. (Letters to Josine M., 1981)
- Brieven aan Simon C. 1971–1975 (Letters to Simon C. 1971–1975, 1982)
- Brieven aan Wim B. 1968–1975 (Letters to Wim B. 1968–1975, 1983)
- Brieven aan Frans P. 1965-1969 (Letters to Frans P. 1965–1969, 1984)
- De stille vriend (The silent friend, 1984)
- Brieven aan geschoolde arbeiders (Letters to educated workers, 1985)
- Zelf schrijver worden (Becoming a writer yourself, 1985)
- Brieven aan Ludo P. 1962-1980 (Letters to Ludo P. 1962-1980, 1986)
- Bezorgde ouders (Parents Worry, 1988)
- Brieven aan mijn lijfarts 1963–1980 (Letters to my personal physician 1963–1980, 1991)
- Brieven van een aardappeleter (Letters from a potato eater, 1993)
- Op zoek (Searching, 1995)
- Het boek van violet en dood (The book of violet and death, 1996)
- Ik bak ze bruiner (I bake them browner, 1996)
- Brieven aan Matroos Vosch (Letters to Matroos Vosch, 1997)
- Het hijgend hert (The panting deer, 1998)

=== Graphic novel ===
In 2003 and 2004 the novel De avonden (The evenings, 1947) was made into a graphic novel (in 4 parts) by Dick Matena.

== In English ==
- The Acrobat (written in English, 1956). Amsterdam/ London, G.A. van Oorschot Publisher, 1956; 2nd ed. Amsterdam, Manteau, 1985.
- Parents Worry (Bezorgde ouders, 1990). Translated by Richard Huijing. London, Minerva, 1991
- The Evenings (De avonden, 1947). Translated by Sam Garrett. London, Pushkin Press, 2016
- Childhood. Two Novellas (Werther Nieland, 1949, and De ondergang van de familie Boslowits, 1950). Translated by Sam Garrett. London, Pushkin Press, 2018

== Film adaptation ==
In 1980, Paul de Lussanet released the film Dear Boys (Lieve jongens), a comedy-drama starring Hugo Metsers, Hans Dagelet and Bill van Dijk. It explores gay desire, with an aging gay writer who becomes more demanding of the young men he has affairs with and their own relationship. It was based on several of Reve's novels.

== See also ==
- NRC's Best Dutch novels
