= De vierde man =

1981 novel by Gerard Reve

De vierde man (The Fourth Man) is a 1981 novel by Dutch author Gerard Reve, the basis for the film of the same title by Paul Verhoeven. Among Reve's works, it stands out as one of only a few novels to have a heterosexual theme.

== Genesis ==
The novel's origins lie in a commission by the Dutch foundation Collectieve Propaganda van het Nederlandse Boek, an organization that promotes Dutch literature. Reve had been asked to supply the 1981 Boekenweekgeschenk, a free book given to every buyer of a Dutch-language book during a one-week nationwide promotion known as Boekenweek ("Book Week"). Since Reve was homosexual and a Catholic convert, and often combined those themes in his work, the organization stipulated that no gay subject matter was to be touched upon. In the end, Reve did include a bit of gay sex in the book, enough for the foundation to reject his offering as too controversial. The 1981 Boekenweekgeschenk was Henri Knap's De Ronde van '43, which was widely panned by critics.

Reve published De vierde man with Elsevier/Manteau in 1981.

== Synopsis ==
The novel is a frame narrative. A writer named Gerard recounts events that happened years before to his friend Ronald. Gerard, after a speaking engagement in the town of V., in the southern Netherlands, has a brief affair with a woman named Christine, with whom he spends the night. After seeing a photograph of her boyfriend, Herman, he becomes infatuated with him. Later, he spends a weekend house-sitting for Christine (during this time he picks up a young man named Laurens and has sex with him in Christine's bed) and opens a little chest reminiscent of a coffin, with a key he recognizes from a dream he had earlier. The box contains documents proving that Christine is three times widowed, and another dream he had comes to mind, in which an old man sang a tune asking who would be the fourth man. He leaves the house in a panic; later he hears that Herman was horribly mutilated after an accident in Christine's car.

== Critical reception ==
On the whole, Dutch critics were pleased with Reve's "in-between" novel, with the notable exception of Alfred Kossmann. One critic, Ivan Sitniakowsky, commented that this was Reve without chitchat, which many of his recent novels had been full of. That same critic considered De vierde man to be a true Dutch gothic novel.

== Film version ==
Paul Verhoeven's adaptation makes some changes to the original: the horror effects are emphasized, and the gay affair with Laurens is scrapped. In addition, the film adds an encounter between Gerard (played by Jeroen Krabbé) and Herman (Thom Hoffman), and a sex scene in a tomb between them. The tomb also contains urns with the ashes of the former husbands of Christine (Renée Soutendijk). This film, seen as a revenge on the critics who criticized his Spetters (1980) as "filthy, violent, and even boring", was Verhoeven's last film in Dutch until Zwartboek (2006).
