= Roger Raveel =

Belgian painter (1921–2013)

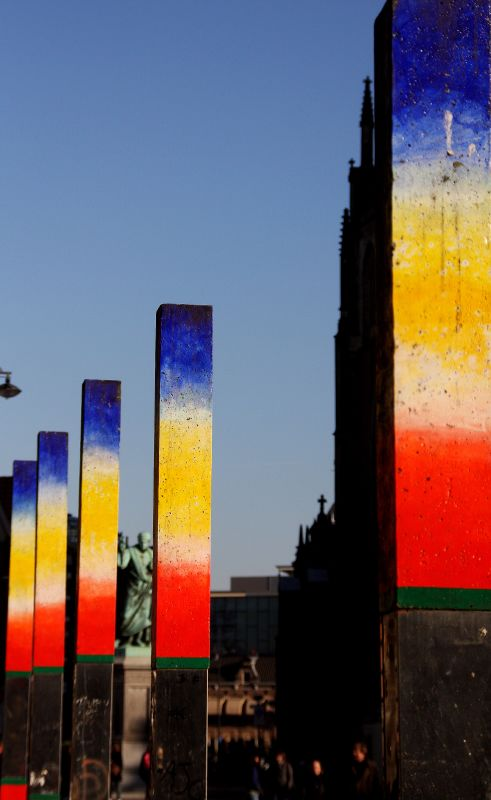
Colored poles on the Grote Markt, Haarlem by Roger Raveel, 2004

Roger Henri Kamiel, Knight Raveel (15 July 1921 – 30 January 2013) was a Belgian painter, whose work is often associated with pop art because of its depiction of everyday objects. Raveel's style evolved throughout his career, from abstract to figurative.

Raveel was born in Machelen-aan-de-Leie, Belgium, and trained in the academies of Ghent and Deinze. After 1952 he began to use large white spaces. A central theme in his work was the opposition of fiction and reality. In 1976 he created a large wall painting in the Brussels metro station Mérode. Portraits of his first wife and favourite model Zulma, to whom he was married until her death in 2009, were a running motif throughout his work.

Raveel died on 30 January 2013 in Deinze, at the age of 91. On 15 July 2016, Google Doodle commemorated his 95th birthday.

== Works ==
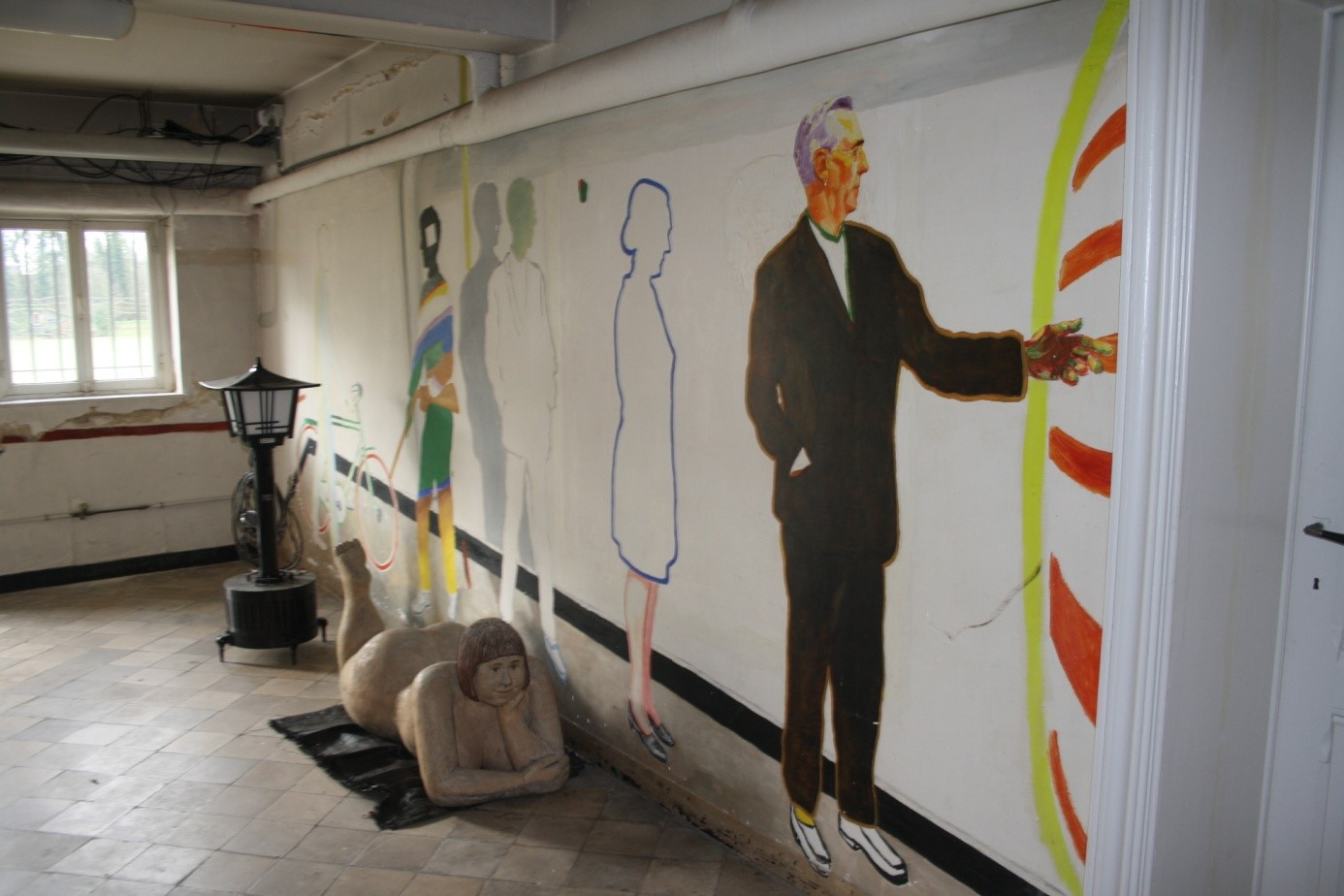
Raveel, Mural 2., 1966, painting on a wall, in the basements of castle Beervelde, Belgium

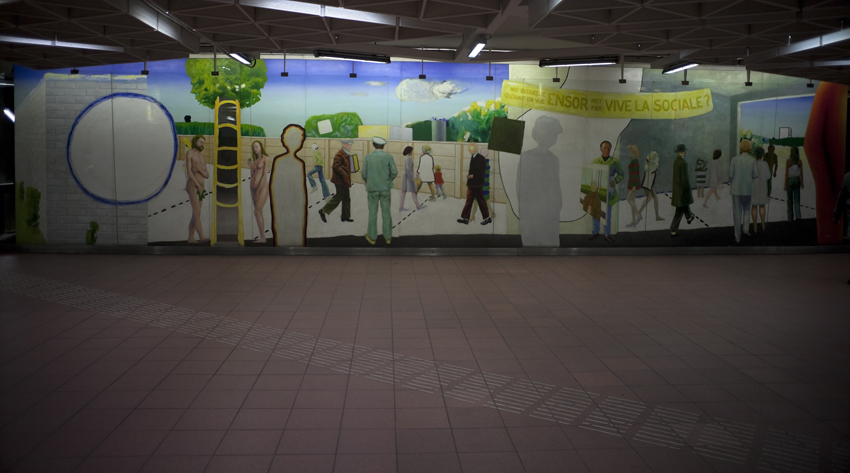
Raveel, Ensor, vive la Sociale?, 1976, mural in the Brussels' Merode metro station

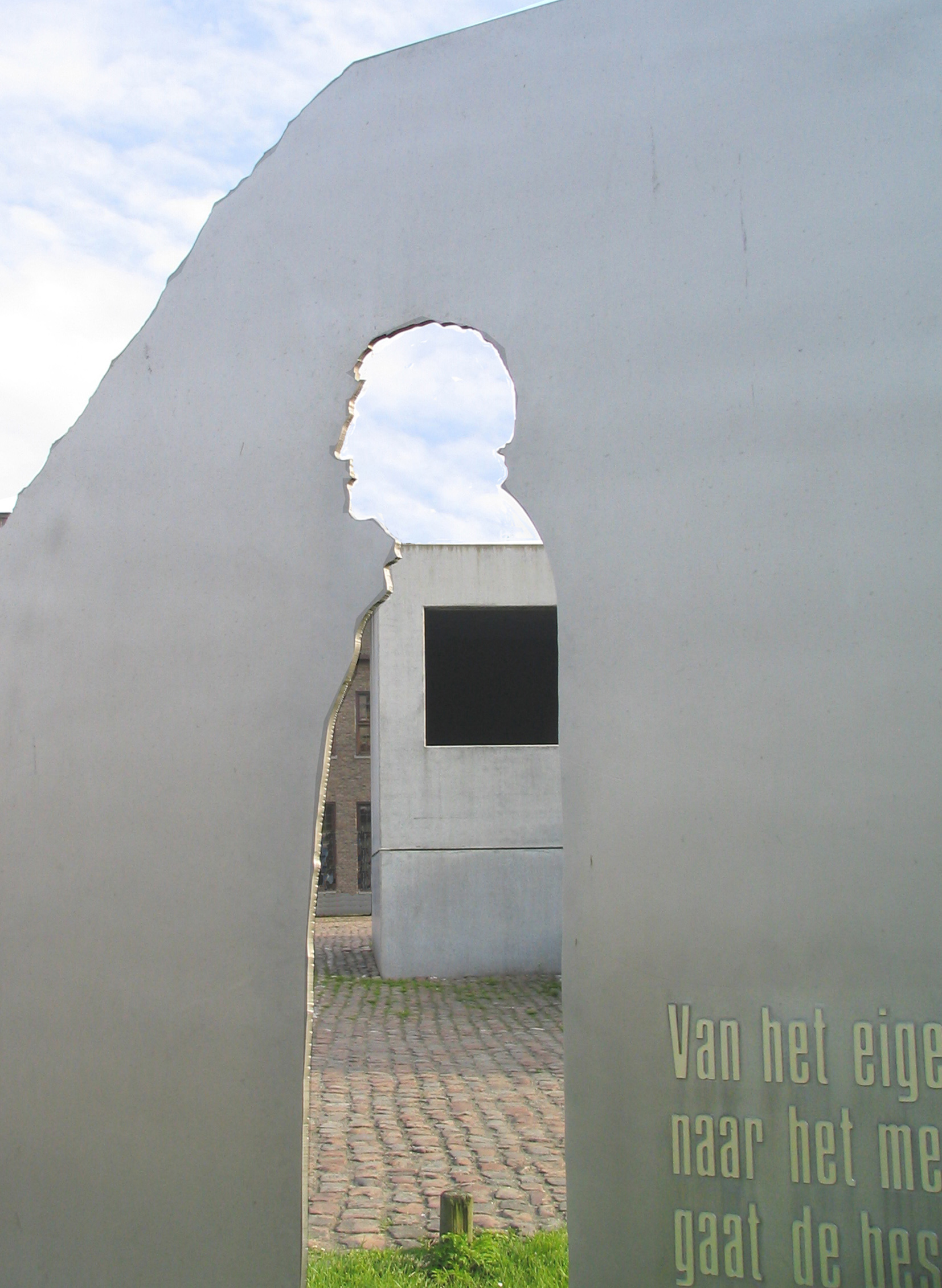
Raveel, Hugo Claus monument, 1993, sculpture of stainless steel + poem-line of Hugo Claus, Watou in Belgium
