= HowNutsAreTheDutch =

Online research platform on mental health

- Available in: Dutch
- Owner: University of Groningen
- Creator: HowNutsAreTheDutch
- Commercial: No
- Registration: Required
- Launched: December 13, 2013
- Current status: 14000 members

"How Nuts Are The Dutch" is an online research platform that became established on 13 December 2013 in the Netherlands. HowNutsAreTheDutch has been designed by researchers from the University of Groningen to support self-measurement of mental health for the entire population of The Netherlands. The project shows how crowdsourcing can be used for studying mental health in the general population. HowNutsAreTheDutch (HoeGekIsNL in Dutch) provides automatic personalized feedback on filled-out questionnaires to provide participants with more basic insight in their mental health, including a comparison with the scores of other participants. HowNutsAreTheDutch is meant to reduce mental health stigma and to promote a discrete categorization of mental health, by showing that all people have both personal strengths and weaknesses, and that most psychological characteristics are distributed continuously in the population. A background goal is to develop and evaluate personalized interventions to improve mood-related problems and social-emotional functioning. In the first year 13000 inhabitants of the Netherlands and Belgium participated.

== Background ==
The HowNutsAreTheDutch name has been reported to be inspired by the Pandora foundation. The Pandora foundation was a Dutch patient organization for people with mental health problems, which used posters with tongue-in-cheek sayings to inform the public and reduce mental health stigma. The HowNutsAreTheDutch project was created by scientists from different fields, including computer sciences, psychiatric epidemiology, psychology, and mathematics.

== Diary Study ==
Since the summer of 2014 HowNutsAreTheDutch provides an automated electronic diary study. This is also known as the ecological momentary assessment methodology. With this diary study participants can monitor their emotions, behaviour, somatic symptoms, and well-being over 30 days (3 times a day), which results in a personal network model. There is no financial compensation for taking part in the research; instead, if participants fill in the diary often enough they get a personal, automatically generated report in return. The web-platform uses automated vector autoregression models to determine cause-effect relationships between the measured features in the time series data. Results evidence substantial between-person variability in within-person associations. The diary study featured in the Dutch magazine "Psychologie" as a Quantified Self tool. Some researchers coupled data from commercially available sensors (i.e., their Apple Watch, Google Fit, Jawbone, NikeFuel, or Misfit) to their HowNutsAreTheDutch diary data to study the interaction between their physical and psychological processes.

One study showed that positive affect and prosocial actions reinforce each other; Thus when an individual was feeling good in one six-hour period, they were more likely to do something prosocial in the next six hours, and vice versa, in line with the mood maintenance theory. Another study showed that negative affect predicted most differences in somatic symptoms between subjects, whereas positive affect predicted most variations in symptom levels within subjects. An increase in positive affect was followed by a decrease in somatic symptoms in the following 24 hours.

== Psychopathology ==
Psychological problems like major depression can be seen as complex dynamic systems in which symptom activation patterns can change suddenly (phase transitions). Researchers showed that people from the general Dutch population were not susceptible to these transitions whereas someone who had experienced a depression was, using mean field approximation.
