= The Fourth Man (1983 film) =

1983 film by Paul Verhoeven

- Theatrical release poster
- Dutch: De vierde man
- Directed by: Paul Verhoeven
- Screenplay by: Gerard Soeteman
- Based on: De vierde man by Gerard Reve
- Produced by: Rob Houwer
- Starring: Jeroen Krabbé; Renée Soutendijk; Thom Hoffman; Dolf de Vries; Geert de Jong; Hans Veerman
- Cinematography: Jan de Bont
- Edited by: Ine Schenkkan
- Music by: Loek Dikker
- Production company: Verenigde Nederlandsche Filmcompagnie
- Distributed by: Tuschinski Film Distribution
- Release date: 24 March 1983 (Netherlands)
- Running time: 102 minutes
- Country: Netherlands
- Language: Dutch

The Fourth Man (Dutch: De vierde man) is a 1983 Dutch psychological-erotic thriller film directed by Paul Verhoeven and starring Jeroen Krabbé, Renée Soutendijk and Thom Hoffman. Based on the 1981 novel of the same name by Gerard Reve, it follows Gerard, a bisexual writer who has a romantic encounter with a mysterious woman, Christine, and subsequently becomes enamored of Herman, another of her male lovers; while attempting to pursue Herman, Gerard is plagued by a series of disturbing visions suggesting Christine may be a murderer who has chosen him as her fourth victim.

Released in 1983, the film was a box-office success in the Netherlands, and in the United States, where it became the highest-grossing Dutch film of all time. It was the Dutch entry for the Best Foreign Language Film at the 56th Academy Awards, but was not accepted as a nominee. The film is sexually explicit and, like many of Verhoeven's other films, shows graphic violence and gore.

== Plot ==
Gerard Reve, an alcoholic, bisexual novelist, travels from Amsterdam to Vlissingen to give a lecture to the city's literary society. At the train station, he unsuccessfully cruises an attractive young man for sex. During the lecture, Gerard notices the society's treasurer, a cosmetologist named Christine Halsslag, incessantly filming him with a handheld camera. She informs him after the lecture that they have booked him a room at the Hotel Bellevue in the city, if he wishes to stay; Gerard is disturbed to realise it is the same hotel that was the subject of a bizarre nightmare he had on the train.

Christine instead asks Gerard to spend the night at her home, which is attached to the salon she owns. The two have sex, after which Gerard has a nightmare in which Christine castrates him with scissors. In the morning, Christine tells Gerard she is a widow, having lost her husband Johan in an accident. Later, in Christine's salon, Gerard finds a photograph of her attractive German lover, Herman, and realises he is the same man he encountered at the train station. Gerard swiftly becomes enamored with Herman, and agrees to have an extended vacation with Christine in hopes of encountering and ultimately bedding him.

Gerard, a Catholic, begins having a number of bizarre, interconnected visions: While praying in a cathedral, he has an erotic vision of the large crucifix of Jesus transforming into Herman, wearing only swim briefs; he also has several visions of Herman with a missing eyeball, as well as of a woman in blue, whom he believes to be the Virgin Mary.

While Christine leaves to visit Herman in Cologne, Gerard is left alone at her home. Instead of writing, he gets drunk and watches home movies that reveal Christine was married to two other men before she married Johan; the footage shows Christine with her three husbands on various vacations. Christine returns with Herman, and Gerard masturbates while spying on the two having sex. In the morning, Christine departs on a business trip, leaving Gerard alone with Herman. Only moments after she leaves, Gerard confesses to Herman that he encountered him before at the train station, to which Herman seems impervious, and mainly interested in Gerard's fame.

Herman takes Gerard on a tour of Vlissingen. Gerard forces him to stop the car when he sees a woman who has appeared recurrently to him in visions. He follows her to a cemetery, but she disappears, as Herman trails behind. A sudden thunderstorm breaks out, and the men seek shelter in a tomb. Gerard attempts an advance on Herman, who reluctantly relents. While Herman fellates him, Gerard notices three urns in the tomb with the inscription "Loving Husbands of Christine Halsslag". He has a number of visions in which all three of Christine's husbands are killed during the vacation activities he viewed in the home movies. Gerard halts the encounter with Herman and confesses his belief that Christine is responsible for her three husband's deaths, and that either of them could fall victim to her. An infuriated Herman dismisses Gerard's claim as a paranoid fantasy.

When the two men depart the cemetery, Herman loses control of the car near a construction site and collides with a bundle of iron rods being lifted by a crane, which impale him through his eye socket, killing him. A traumatised Gerard is taken to a hospital for examination, where he tells the physician, Dr. de Vries—an acquaintance of Christine's from the literary society—that she is a witch who leads men to their deaths. De Vries dismisses Gerard as a pathological liar, assuring him that all of Christine's husbands' deaths were accidents. Gerard comes to the realisation that, for him, the Virgin Mary's appearances in his visions were warnings of Christine's danger. As a consequence, when she arrives at the hospital, Gerard attacks her, and is incapacitated with a sedative by the Mary from Gerard's visions, who appears to him as a nurse. As Gerard is hospitalised, Christine meets another attractive man in the hospital lobby, with whom she leaves.

== Cast ==
- Jeroen Krabbé as Gerard Reve
- Renée Soutendijk as Christine Halsslag
- Thom Hoffman as Herman
- Dolf de Vries as Dr. de Vries
- Geert de Jong as Ria
- Hans Veerman as the funeral director
- Hero Muller as Josefs
- Caroline de Beus as Adrienne
- Reinout Bussemaker as the first husband
- Erik J. Meijer as the second husband
- Ursul de Geer as the third husband
- Filip Bolluyt as the surfer
- Hedda Lornie as the bookstore saleswoman
- Paul Nygaard as the violist
- Guus van der Made as the train waiter

== Themes ==
=== Catholicism ===
Paul Verhoeven has said of the film:

The Fourth Man has to do with my vision of religion. In my opinion, Christianity is nothing more than one of many interpretations of reality, neither more nor less. Ideally, it would be nice to believe that there is a God somewhere out there, but it looks to me as if the whole Christian religion is a major symptom of schizophrenia in half the world's population: civilizations scrambling to rationalize their chaotic existence. Subsequently, Christianity has a tendency to look like magic or the occult. And I liked that ambiguity, because I wanted my audience to take something home with them. I wanted them to wonder about what religion really is. Remember, that Christianity is a religion grounded in one of the most violent acts of murder, the crucifixion. Otherwise, religion wouldn't have had any kind of impact. With regard to the irony of the violence, much of that probably comes from my childhood experiences during and immediately following the Second World War. In fact, if it hadn't been for the German occupation and then the American occupation, I would have never been a filmmaker."

He told The Seattle Times, "You never know if you're dealing with a super-reality or not." Reve endures many experiences which may be hallucinations, such as a famous scene in which he believes a woman is pointing a gun at him, then turns to show it is merely a key to a door, and another in which, on a train, he studies a picture on the wall so intently that he is apparently drawn into it.

Mike Pinsky of the website DVD Verdict points out repeated motifs, including the red, blood, as well as the religious images of the Virgin Mary, and the Cross, including: images of a spider climbing over a crucified figure of Jesus pursuing a fly; Reve's character tipping his glass to a statue of the Virgin Mary; a woman peeling an apple, and holding the peel in the shape of a halo over her son's head; and a sign that reads "Donate Your Blood to the Red Cross".

=== Homosexuality ===
American filmmaker Paul Bartel, expressing admiration for the film, described The Fourth Man as "the first gay, Catholic horror film." Film scholar Charles Derry notes in his book Dark Dreams 2.0: A Psychological History of the Modern Horror Film from the 1950s to the 21st Century (2009), that "what makes The Fourth Man especially interesting—despite its misogyny (typical for horror) that turns women into symbols, updating the archetypes of the whore and virgin into the super-archetypes of the she-devil and Virgin Mary—is that the homosexuality of the protagonist is presented as a positive moral alternative to the heterosexuality of the femme fatale."

== Development ==
In the early 2000s, Verhoeven revealed in the DVD audio commentary that he had conceived The Fourth Man, with the help of his screenwriter, as a trap for the critics who had panned Spetters: the film was thus riddled with biblical quotations, symbolism and intellectual trappings devoid of meaning, with the sole aim of winning over journalists by making them believe in a substance that wasn't there.

== Release ==
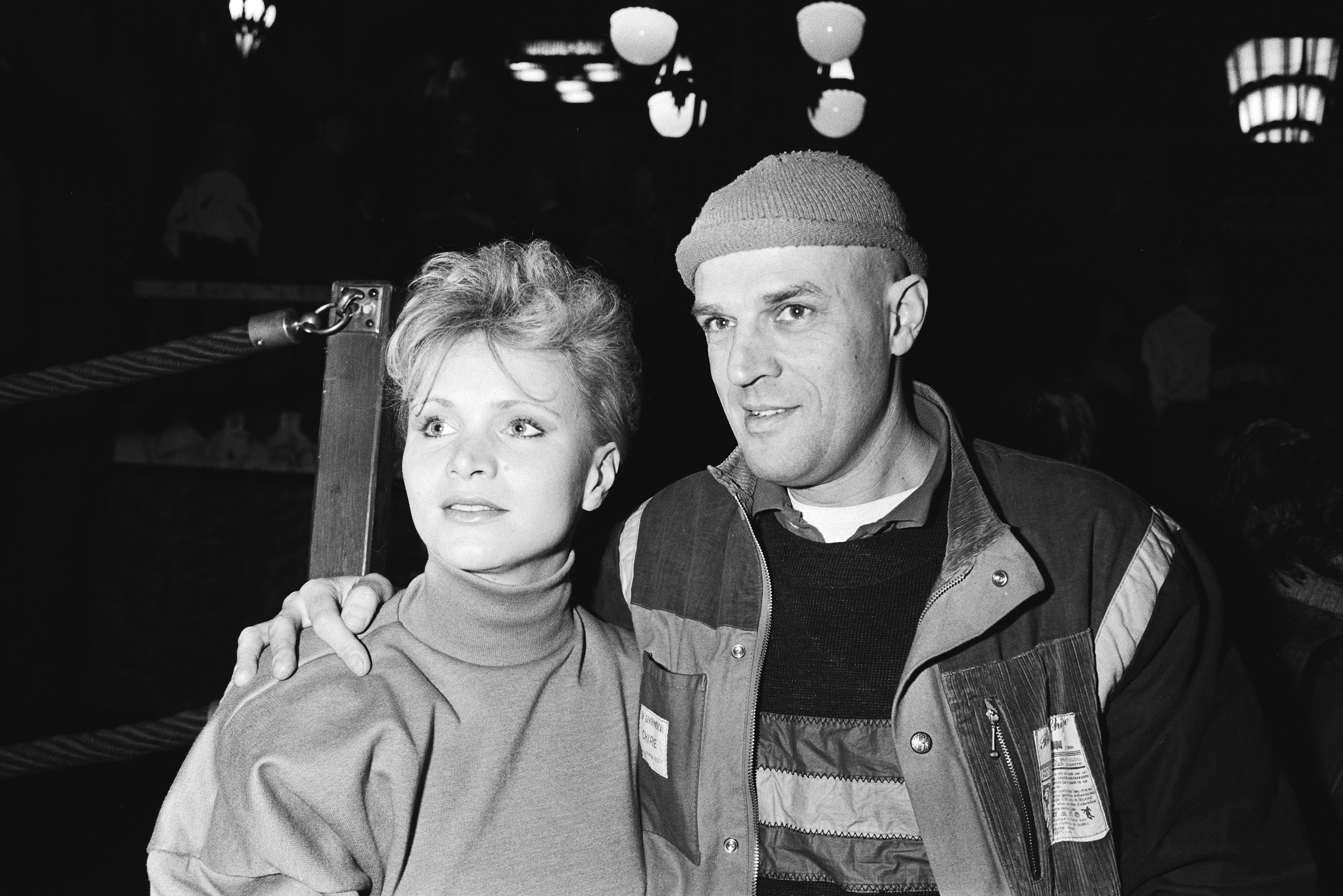
Renée Soutendijk and Jeroen Krabbé at the film's premiere, 1983

The Fourth Man premiered in the Netherlands on 24 March 1983.

== Reception ==
=== Box office ===
The film was a box office hit in the Netherlands, gaining 274,699 admissions, but lower than the millions of visitors his previous films had. The film was more successful in the United States, where it received widespread critical acclaim and was the highest-grossing Dutch film of all-time with a gross of $1.7 million.

=== Critical response ===
The Seattle Times, in a rave review, wrote that the film is "confident and skillfully made" and "erotically charged (and graphic)," adding,

Verhoeven has created an intricate, witty thriller about a writer's fears and paranoid imaginings and their possible fulfillment ... The director carefully steers a middle course that leaves you wondering at times if the woman is a witch, and at other times if the writer is just a victim of a morbid Catholic upbringing and a runaway imagination. Usually movies that take this approach (like Jack Clayton's delicately balanced masterpiece of ambiguity, The Innocents) are too frustrating to American audience expectations to become commercially successful. Yet The Fourth Man appears to have broken through that barrier to become one of the few profitable foreign films of the past year. Verhoeven makes the writer's suspicions so entertaining that his dreams and fantasies, which might just be premonitions, have a visual and psychological force that is actually stronger than the 'reality' of the other characters.

The Philadelphia Inquirer called the film "highly charged" and enthused, "The Fourth Man falls into the general terrain occupied by the film noir, but it resists any label and – in its more lurid scenes – defies description. It is graphic in both violence and sex and most decidedly not for the squeamish ... Verhoeven's surface theme is the consequence of obsessive sexual desire, but the main undercurrent has to do with the vague line that separates fantasy from reality ... nothing is what it seems ... Verhoeven has designed the film in a way that keeps the viewer as off balance as the protagonist ... If there is such a thing as macabre wit, it can be found in the way Verhoeven treats his characters."

In contrast, the Philadelphia Daily News wrote that the movie "is never as kinky or as funny as the character of Reve is. Its purple plot is beautifully lurid but the film itself is one step away from being brazenly lurid. It holds back."

Pinsky, of DVD Verdict, thought the film to be "artsy to a ridiculous extreme. Saturated with images borrowed from symbolist and surrealist art, the film hammers the viewer over the head in every scene." However, he adds, "It is all much too much. And indeed it is supposed to be. Just as it is unclear in Total Recall [a 1990 film by Verhoeven] whether we are meant to be watching a straight-faced action film, or a deliberately excessive send-up of action film clichés, The Fourth Man can be seen on both levels. It works better as a comedy however." Pinsky concludes, "it is a psychosexual thriller that often undermines its own narrative authority. Verhoeven gives us plenty of hints that we should not take things too seriously, particularly through Gerard's erratic behavior: his childish lust for Herman, his desperately facile attempt to fake psychic powers in order to trick Christine, and his increasingly baroque hallucinations. Everything in Gerard's world becomes steeped in irony." After writing this, Pinsky adds, "Verhoeven is quite clear up front that the movie is meant to be a joke and that Christine's guilt is deliberately ambiguous ... If you do not take it seriously, you will likely get a kick out of this film."

The Fourth Man has an approval rating of 100% on review aggregator website Rotten Tomatoes, based on 11 reviews, and an average rating of 7.7/10.

=== Accolades ===
The Fourth Man earned the 1983 International Critics' Award at the Toronto International Film Festival and was nominated for the 1983 Gold Hugo for Best Feature Award at the Chicago International Film Festival. Verhoeven opened the Seattle International Film Festival with his film, which garnered the 1984 Los Angeles Film Critics Association Award for Best Foreign Language Film as well as the best New York reviews of any Verhoeven movie. The film was nominated for Best Foreign Language Film of 1984 by the U.S. National Board of Review of Motion Pictures. Also in 1984, the Avoriaz Fantastic Film Festival gave Verhoeven its Special Jury Award.

== Home media ==
Image Entertainment released a Laserdisc into the US market in 1984 (LDDB Entry).

Anchor Bay Entertainment released a DVD edition of the film in May 2001.

== Legacy ==
The Fourth Man ranked #93 in Empire magazine's "The 100 Best Films of World Cinema" in 2010.

== Sequels ==
- The film was loosely remade as Verhoeven's fourth Hollywood movie, Basic Instinct (1992).

== See also ==
- Isha katlanit, a rule in rabbinic literature (the Talmud) against marrying a woman who has been widowed twice or more.
- List of submissions to the 56th Academy Awards for Best Foreign Language Film
- List of Dutch submissions for the Academy Award for Best Foreign Language Film
- Apophenia

== Sources ==
- Alexis, Jonas (2011). Christianity and Rabbinic Judaism: Surprising Differences, Conflicting Visions, and Worldview Implications – from the Early Church to Our Modern Time. WestBow Press. ISBN 978-1-4497-3487-9.
- Bouineau, Jean-March (2001). Paul Verhoeven: Beyond Flesh and Blood. Paris, France: Cinéditions. ISBN 978-2-951-63060-4.
- Derry, Charles (2009). Dark Dreams 2.0: A Psychological History of the Modern Horror Film from the 1950s to the 21st Century. Jefferson, North Carolina: McFarland. ISBN 978-0-786-43397-1.
