= My Little War =

First edition Cover art by Paul Gustave Van Hecke

My Little War (Dutch: Mijn kleine oorlog) is the fourth novel by Louis Paul Boon, first published in 1947. A translation was produced by Paul Vincent in 2010.

== Origin ==
At the end of 1944, Boon started a series of chronicles in the Belgium weekly Sunday Post. In 1946 he collected the 33 short stories and added non-related fragments from his notebooks to each story, which appeared as a book in 1947. In 1960, Boon revised the work for a second edition that more closely reflects Dutch standards for correct language. See chapter two of Vanheste (1989, link below) for a scholarly study of the textual history.

== Content ==
My Little War contains some thirty short stories, each of two pages on average, dealing with the troubles of the 'man in the street' during World War II and the German Occupation of Belgium.

Most characters appear in only one story, hence the only character that can be considered somewhat of the main character is the narrator himself, Louis. He is the protagonist in the first chronicles and the witness in others, while still others have only reached him by hearsay. in addition to the publication history, the content have led readers and scholars alike to consider the book rather as a collection of stories than a novel. In fact, the book is much more of a unity than it is credited for. For instance, the narrator insists that the reader could just as easily be the writer, and this equation of "me" and "you" is consistently held up throughout all parts of the book. Hence an argument can be made to qualify it as a highly originally shaped novel.

== Reception ==
Upon publication, and for some decades after that, My Little War was often overlooked and sold poorly. But as readers and scholars began to study Boon's other works and understood the nature of his art better and better, the book acquired the reputation of being the inauguration of Boon's major phase. In recent decades it has attracted a huge body of commentary, as an online search for the original title in Dutch will quickly reveal.

== See also ==
- The Sorrow of Belgium (1983) by Hugo Claus
- The Assault (1982) by Harry Mulisch
