= The Sorrow of Belgium =

1983 novel by Hugo Claus

- First edition (Dutch)
- Author: Hugo Claus
- Original title: Het Verdriet van België
- Translator: Arnold J. Pomerans
- Cover artist: James Ensor's Music in the Vlaanderenstraat (1891)
- Language: Dutch
- Publisher: De Bezige Bij
- Publication date: 1983
- Publication place: Belgium
- English publication date: 1994
- ISBN: 978-0-14-018801-1

The Sorrow of Belgium (Dutch: Het verdriet van België) is a 1983 novel by the Belgian author Hugo Claus (1929–2008). The book, widely considered Claus's most important work and "the most important Dutch-language novel of the twentieth century", is a Bildungsroman which explores themes around politics and growing up in Flanders around World War II. It has been described as "one of the great novels of postwar Europe".

The Sorrow of Belgium explores the childhood and youth of Louis Seynaeve, a Flemish schoolboy living in the region of Kortrijk during World War II when Belgium was under German occupation. The novel itself is a Bildungsroman and Künstlerroman, formed from two sections:

- "The Sorrow" (Het verdriet); 27 numbered chapters with titles
- "of Belgium" (van België); text not divided in chapters.

The work was first published in an English translation by Arnold J. Pomerans in 1994. It was also made into a mini-series the same year.

== Background ==
Hugo Claus was born in Bruges, West Flanders in 1929. He grew up in a Catholic milieu and was educated at a boarding school. He was eleven at the time of the German invasion of Belgium. Under the German occupation, many of Claus' teachers and his own father were sympathetic to collaborationism and fascism. Claus himself was briefly a member of a Flemish nationalist youth organisation.

== Synopsis ==
Belgium, 1939. Louis Seynaeve, who turns eleven in April, goes to a boarding school led by nuns in Haarbeke, a fictitious town close to Kortrijk. Louis has a lot of fantasies. He and his friends call themselves the Four Apostles and they possess seven forbidden books. His father comes to tell him that his mother fell down the stairs, which actually means that she is pregnant. Several months later the baby is stillborn.

His family members are Flemish nationalists. Louis' father buys a printing press in Germany and a Hitler Youth doll. During the German occupation of Belgium in the Second World War his family sympathises with the Germans. Louis attends meetings of the Hitler Youth in Mecklenburg.

Louis discovers more "forbidden books" and becomes interested in entartete Kunst. Gradually he becomes aware of the narrow-mindedness of his family and his education. He ends up becoming a writer. He is the author of "The Sorrow", the first part of the novel.

== Main characters ==
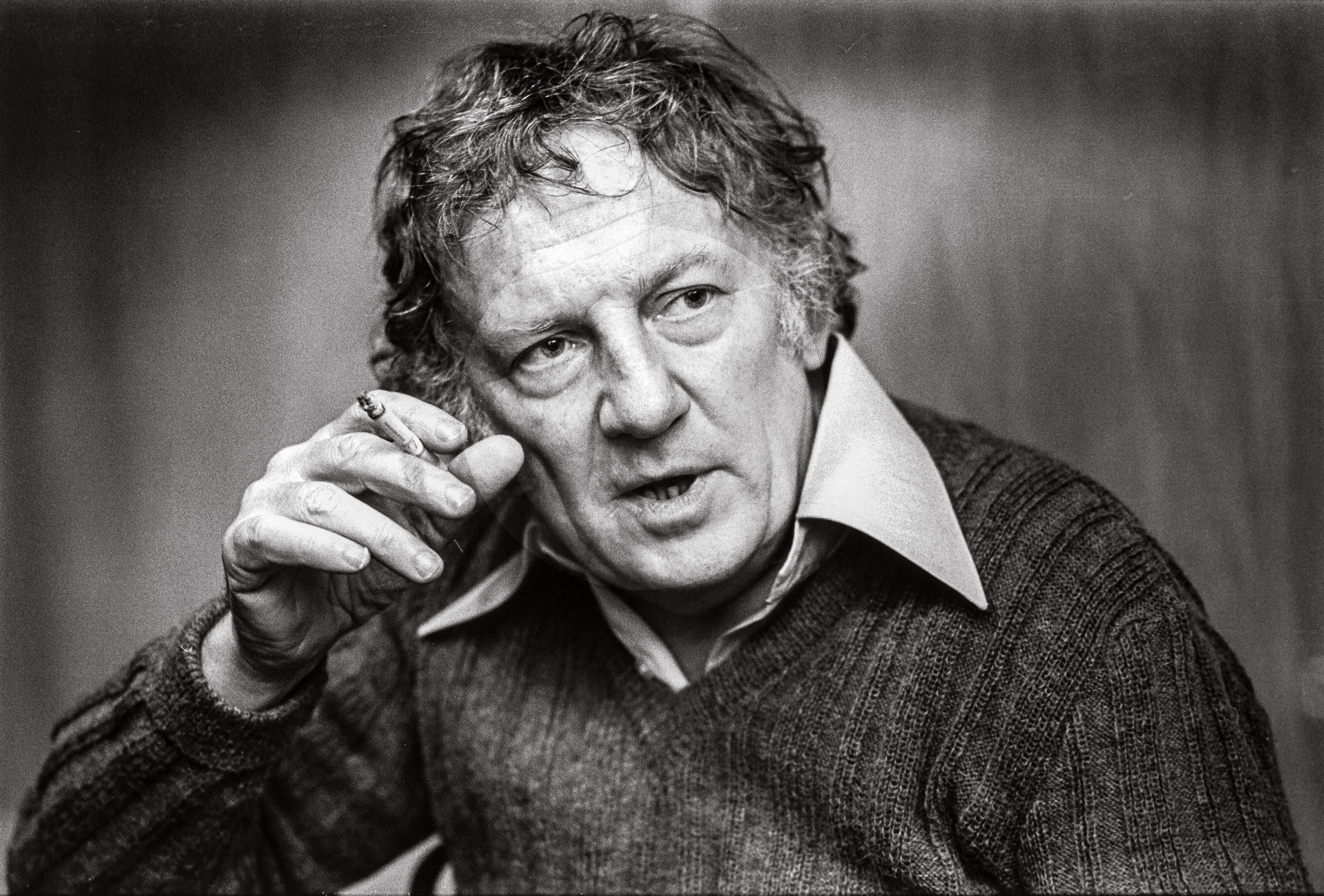
Hugo Claus, pictured in 1984

- Louis Seynaeve is the protagonist, a Belgian youth who is an alter ego of the author
- Staf Seynaeve is Louis' father, a printer and a Flemish nationalist with pro-Nazi sympathies.
- Constance Seynaeve-Bossuyt is Louis' mother. She will work for a German company during the war.
- Gerard Vlieghe is Louis' best friend at the boarding school. He will join NSJV, a Belgian movement related to the Hitlerjugend.
- Rebekka Cosijns ("Bekka") is a girlfriend of Louis. His parents forbid him to play with her because she is Romani.
- Evariste de Launey is a Jesuit and a teacher of Louis. He will work for the Belgian resistance.
- Byttebier is a classmate, known as the "Apostle Barnabas".
- Dondeyne is a classmate, known as "Apostle Matthias". His younger brother is called René.

== Reception ==
Wim Hazeu in Hervormd Nederland: "After Claus probably no one in our Sprachraum will be able to write such a big and in many views great book about Belgium in wartime. He's the only one who could handle such a subject and he did it."

Suzanne Ruta in The New York Times Book Review: "Mr. Claus' wonderful novel is a chronicle of war in a small corner of one small country and a painstaking portrait of the artist as an obnoxious young man.

Reviewing the work in the London Review of Books in 1990, Patrick Parrinder stated that The Sorrow "presents a world in which collaboration with the Nazis is made to seem as inevitable as breathing." He noted that "while Claus’s novel is a major exercise in the recovery of buried historical experience, it is weirder and more idiosyncratic than this summary suggests. It is a chronicle not only of the years of social deprivation and darkness but of the 'slimy, inner civil war' in the protagonist’s consciousness."

== See also ==
- The Assault (1982) by Harry Mulisch
- My Little War (1947) by Louis Paul Boon
