= 10251 Mulisch =

Asteroid

Discovery
- Discovered by: C. J. van Houten; I. van Houten-G. T. Gehrels
- Discovery site: Palomar Obs.
- Discovery date: 26 March 1971

Designations
- Named after: Harry Mulisch (Dutch writer)
- Alternative designations: 3089 T-1 · 1980 WX_{1} 1997 ML_{10}
- Minor planet category: main-belt · (inner) background

Orbital characteristics
- Epoch 23 March 2018 (JD 2458200.5)
- Uncertainty parameter 0
- Observation arc: 46.10 yr (16,837 d)
- Aphelion: 2.5367 AU
- Perihelion: 2.1299 AU
- Semi-major axis: 2.3333 AU
- Eccentricity: 0.0872
- Orbital period (sidereal): 3.56 yr (1,302 d)
- Mean anomaly: 147.36°
- Mean motion: 0° 16^{m} 35.4^{s} / day
- Inclination: 2.0659°
- Longitude of ascending node: 250.96°
- Argument of perihelion: 205.49°

Physical characteristics
- Mean diameter: 2.398±0.559 km
- Geometric albedo: 0.337±0.158
- Absolute magnitude (H): 15.2

10251 Mulisch, provisional designation 3089 T-1, is a bright background asteroid from the inner regions of the asteroid belt, approximately 2.4 kilometers (1.5 miles) in diameter. It was discovered during the Palomar–Leiden Trojan survey on 26 March 1971, by Ingrid and Cornelis van Houten at Leiden, and Tom Gehrels at Palomar Observatory in California, United States. The asteroid was named after Dutch writer Harry Mulisch.

== Orbit and classification ==
Mulisch is a non-family asteroid from the main belt's background population. It orbits the Sun in the inner main-belt at a distance of 2.1–2.5 AU once every 3 years and 7 months (1,302 days; semi-major axis of 2.33 AU). Its orbit has an eccentricity of 0.09 and an inclination of 2° with respect to the ecliptic. The body's observation arc begins at Palomar on 26 March 1971, two nights prior to its official discovery observation.

=== Palomar–Leiden Trojan survey ===
The survey designation "T-1" stands for the first Palomar–Leiden Trojan survey, named after the fruitful collaboration of the Palomar and Leiden Observatory in the 1960s and 1970s. Gehrels used Palomar's Samuel Oschin telescope (also known as the 48-inch Schmidt Telescope), and shipped the photographic plates to Ingrid and Cornelis van Houten at Leiden Observatory where astrometry was carried out. The trio are credited with the discovery of several thousand asteroid discoveries.

== Physical characteristics ==
The asteroid has an absolute magnitude 15.2. Based on its high albedo measured by the Wide-field Infrared Survey Explorer, Mulisch likely belongs to the stony S-complex. As of 2018, no rotational lightcurve of this asteroid has been obtained from photometric observations. Its rotation period, pole and shape remain unknown.

=== Diameter and albedo ===
According to the survey carried out by the NEOWISE mission of NASA's WISE telescope, Mulisch measures 2.398 kilometers in diameter and its surface has an albedo of 0.337.

== Naming ==
This minor planet was named after Dutch writer Harry Mulisch (1927–2010), known for his novels, plays, essays, poems and philosophical reflections such as The Discovery of Heaven. The official naming citation was published by the Minor Planet Center on 13 June 2006 (M.P.C. 56959).
