= Feminateek =

Collection of images of female eroticism

Feminateek, also known as the Fenomenale Feminateek ("Phenomenal Library of Women"), is a collection of 22400 images of female eroticism compiled in 144 volumes by Flemish author Louis Paul Boon.

Boon started his hobby of collecting and filing female erotic photographs and images from periodicals in 1954, and continued to do so until his death in 1979. Boon organised his collection thematically, according to a scheme he wrote down in what is known as De Catalogus Van De Fenomenale Feminateek ("The Catalogue of the Phenomenal Library of Women").

In 2004 Meulenhoff/Manteau published a selection of the Fenomenale Feminateek, together with the Catalogue. At the time of this publication an exposition of a limited part of the Feminateek was put up in the Letterkundig Museum in The Hague.

In 2008 two expositions of images of the Feminateek were planned in Belgium. One was planned from 20 June in the FotoMuseum of Antwerp, but was cancelled after an intervention by the provincial authority. The curator of the "Zogezegd" literary festival in Gent confirmed shortly after the Antwerp decision became known end of January 2008, that the plans to show the images at the Gent festival on 4 April remain unchanged.
