= Dender =

Dender/Dendre
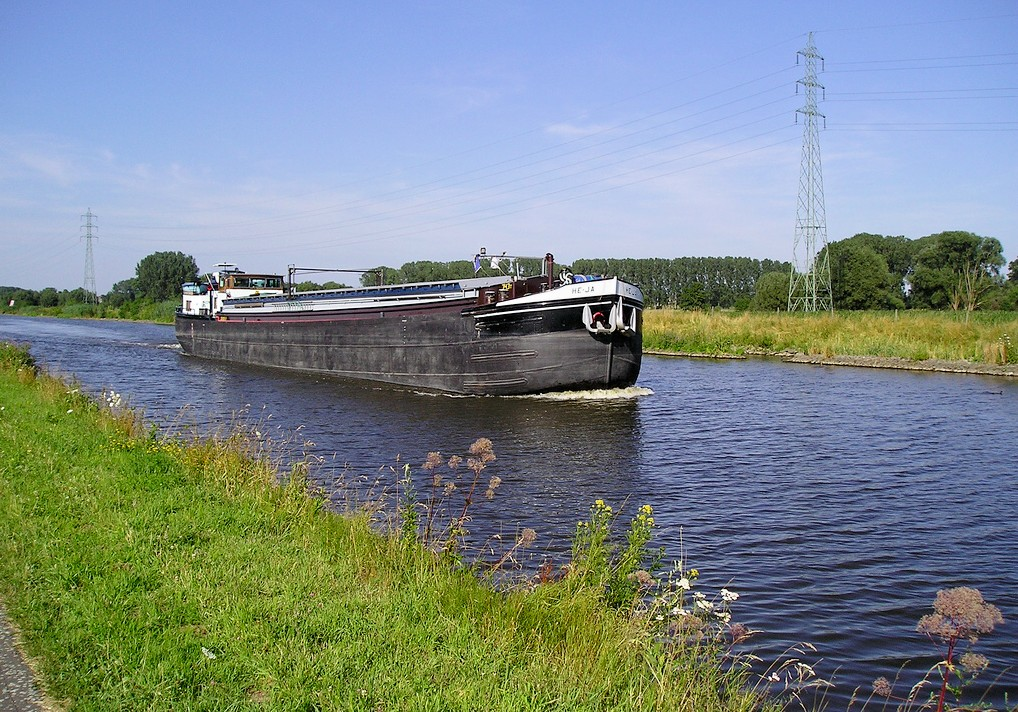
- A ship on the Dender between Dendermonde and Aalst

Location
- Country: Belgium

Physical characteristics
- Source
  - location: Hainaut
- Mouth
  - location: Scheldt
  - coordinates: 51.0449°N 4.0890°E
- Length: 65 km (40 mi)

Basin features
- Progression: Scheldt→ North Sea

The Dender (Dutch: [ˈdɛndər]) or Dendre (French: [dɑ̃dʁ]) is a 65-kilometre (40-mile) long river in Belgium, the right tributary of the river Scheldt. The confluence of the two rivers is in the Belgian town of Dendermonde.

The Western or Little Dender is 22 kilometres (14 miles) long and begins in Barry near Leuze-en-Hainaut at an elevation of about 60 to 70 metres (200 to 230 ft) above sea level. It begins as several canals in the fields merging together to form the Little Dender. As such, it does not have any one specific source. The source of the Eastern Dender, which is 39 kilometres (24 miles) long, is near Jurbise at a height of 100 metres (330 feet) above sea level. The two rivers meet in the town of Ath. From that confluence, the river is called the Dender proper. From Ath, the Dender passes into the Denderstreek through the cities and towns of Geraardsbergen, south of which its tributary, the Mark, flows into it. From this confluence, the river continues to flow through Ninove, Denderleeuw, and Aalst, before ending in Dendermonde. The Dender is navigable up to Aalst for small ships up to 600 tons and further upstream for ships up to 350 tons. The Molenbeek-Ter Erpenbeek flows into the Dender at Hofstade.

== Gallery ==
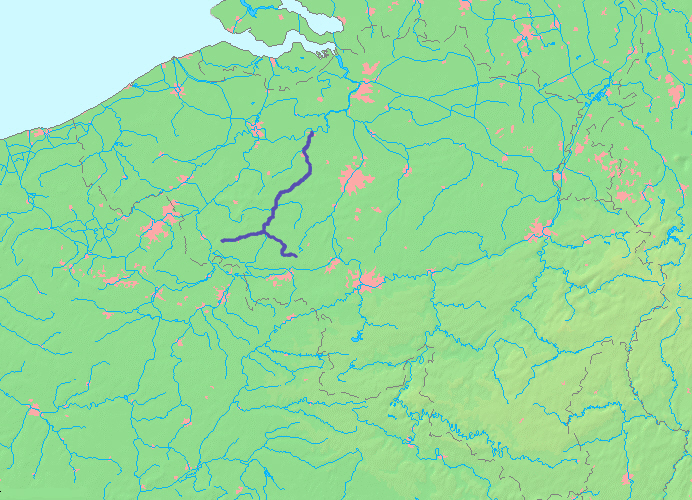
The course of the Dender

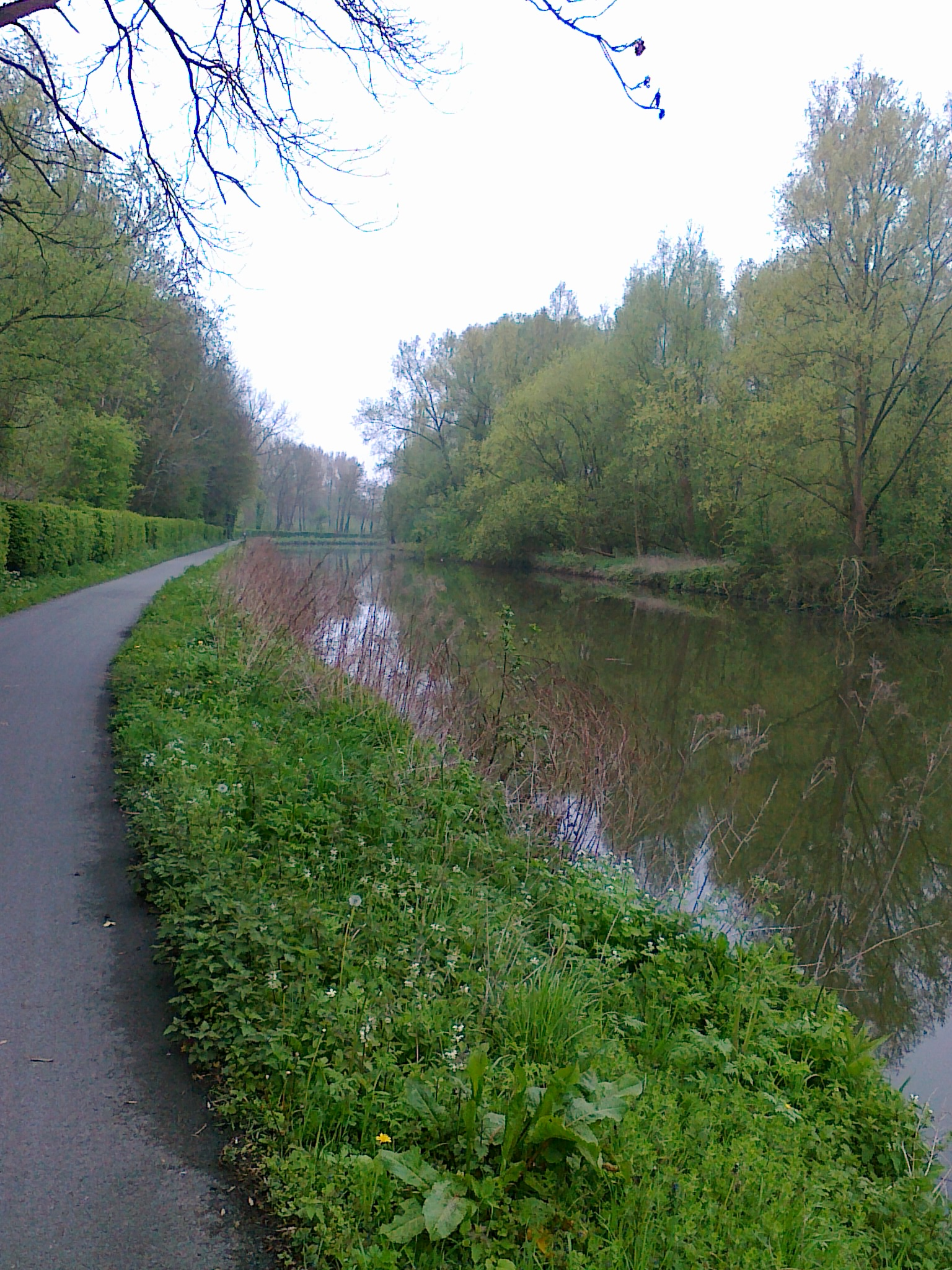
The Dender in Aalst and Erembodegem

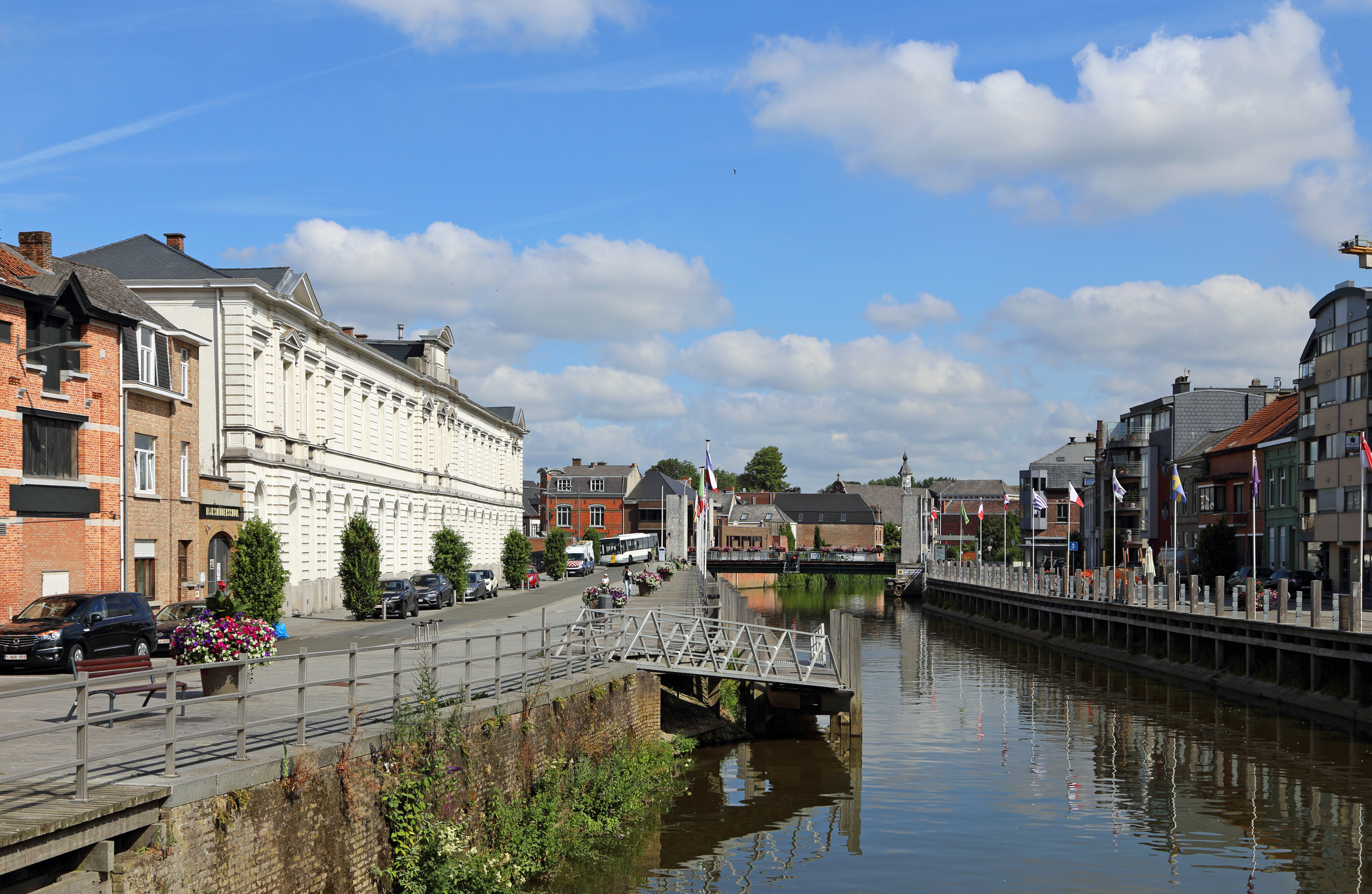
The Dender in Geraardsbergen
