= Mark (Dender) =

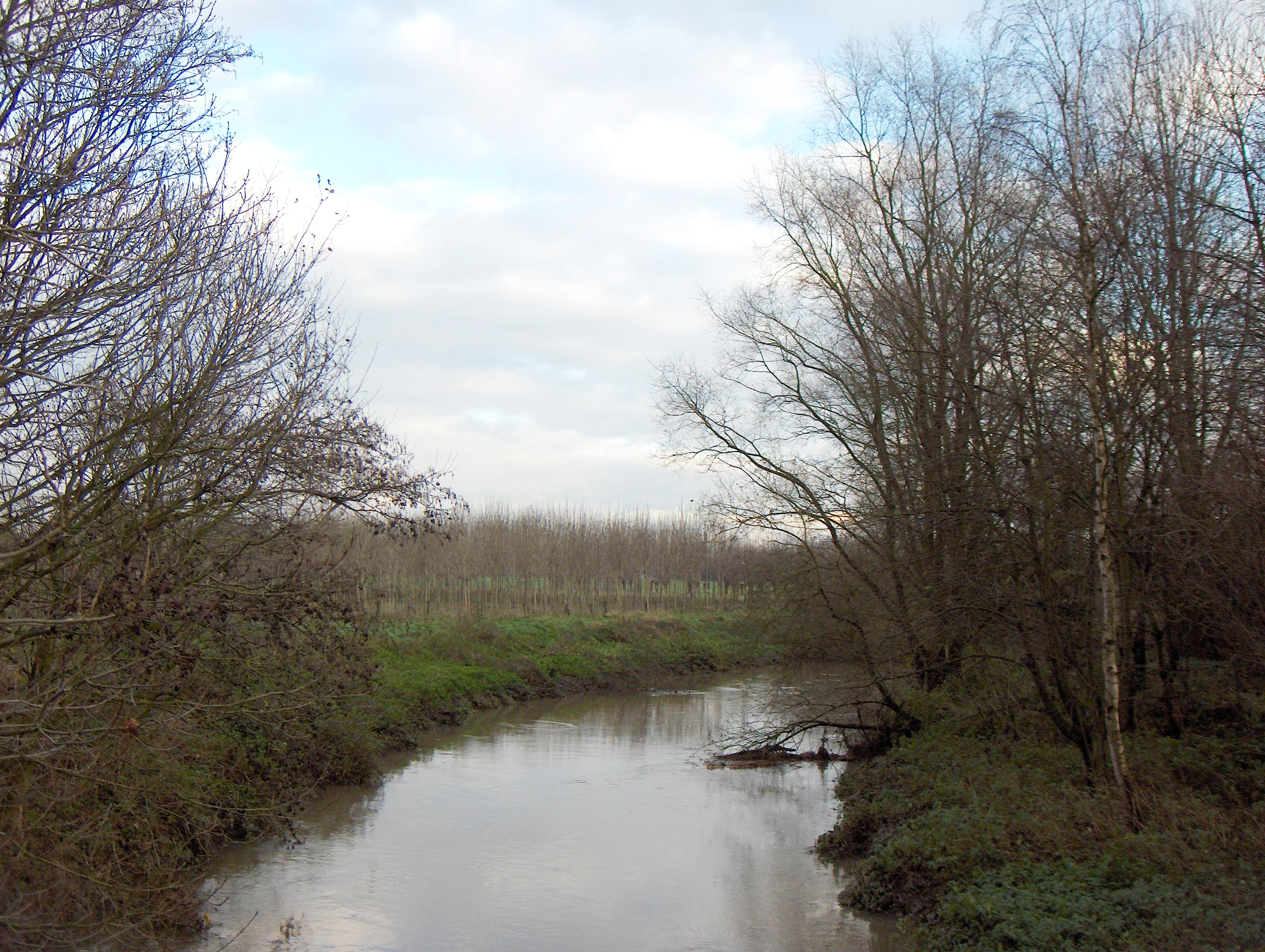

Location
- Country: Belgium

Physical characteristics
- Mouth: Dender
  - coordinates: 50°44′17″N 3°51′49″E

Basin features
- Progression: Dender→ Scheldt→ North Sea

The Mark (Dutch) or Marcq (French) is a river in Belgium, right tributary of the Dender. It rises around 5 kilometres (3 mi) south-west of Enghien, Hainaut, close to the village St-Marcou in the forests of Bois de Ligne en Bois d'Enghien. It passes through the homonymous village Marcq, Enghien, Herne, Tollembeek, Galmaarden, Vollezele, Bever, Moerbeke and Viane. The Mark flows into the Dender in Deux-Acres, between Lessines and Geraardsbergen. The Dender is a tributary of the Scheldt. The Mark is approximately 25 kilometres (16 mi) long.
