= The Discovery of Heaven =

Novel by Harry Mulisch

- First edition cover
- Author: Harry Mulisch
- Original title: De ontdekking van de hemel
- Translator: Paul Vincent
- Language: Dutch
- Genre: Philosophical fiction
- Set in: Netherlands, Cuba, Rome, Poland and Jerusalem, 1933–1985
- Publisher: De Bezige Bij (Dutch); Penguin Books (English)
- Publication date: October 1992
- Publication place: Netherlands
- English publication date: 1996
- Media type: Book
- Pages: 905
- ISBN: 0-670-85668-1
- OCLC: 34411842
- Dewey Decimal: 839.3/1364 20
- LC Class: PT5860.M85 O5713 1996
- Preceded by: The Last Call
- Followed by: The Procedure

The Discovery of Heaven (Dutch: De ontdekking van de hemel) is a 1992 novel by Dutch writer Harry Mulisch. It is considered Mulisch's masterpiece and was voted best book in the Dutch language in a 2007 poll among the readers of NRC Handelsblad.

A 2001 film adaptation by director Jeroen Krabbé features Stephen Fry and Flora Montgomery in the leading roles.

== Plot summary ==
In the book, an angel-like being is given the task of returning the stone tablets containing the Ten Commandments to Heaven. However, he cannot directly travel to Earth, so he manipulates events to bring three people together who will conceive a child with an innate desire to fulfill the mission. The book is divided into four parts, each representing a different phase of the story.

In "The Beginning of the Beginning," the angel reports to his superior that he has completed his mission after seventy years of planning. He orchestrates the birth of the messenger's parents, Max Delius and Ada Brons, who meet in the aftermath of World War II. Max and Ada's friend, Onno Quist, also plays a significant role in their lives. Max and Onno become close friends, engaging in intellectual conversations about various topics, including religion and philosophy. Ada falls in love with Max, but their relationship ends abruptly when Max leaves during a sexual encounter. Ada then develops a relationship with Onno.

In "The End of the Beginning," Ada discovers she is pregnant, and Onno proposes to her, assuming the child is his. However, Max realizes he could be the father and decides to distance himself from Ada and Onno. Ada's condition worsens after a car accident, and Max begins a secret affair with Ada's mother, Mrs. Brons. Max suggests they raise the child together, and they move to an apartment near Westerbork. Ada gives birth to a child named Quinten.

"The Beginning of the End" focuses on Quinten's upbringing. He is an introverted and intelligent child, fascinated by architecture and ancient keys. Onno's political career crumbles, and he decides to disappear from society. Max leaves Mrs. Brons for another woman but continues to live with her and Quinten. Max is on the verge of a major astronomical discovery when he is killed by a meteoroid.

In "The End of the End," Quinten, now sixteen, sets out to find his father. He travels to Italy and eventually meets Onno in Rome. They visit various sights and become fixated on the stone tablets stored in the Lateran. Quinten believes they hold significance in Christianity and Judaism. After studying ancient architecture and locksmithing, Quinten convinces Onno to steal the stone tablets. They discover the tablets in the Lateran chapel and travel to Jerusalem.

In Jerusalem, Onno encounters an elderly woman who may be Max's mother and Quinten's grandmother. Meanwhile, Quinten enters a hallucinative state and returns to the Dome of the Rock with the tablets. In this dream-like state, he ascends to heaven with the tablets, completing his mission.

In the end, the angel-like being is commended by the Archangel for his actions, but he feels remorse for severing the connection between heaven and Earth. However, he realizes the situation is beyond his control.

== Reception ==
Cover of an English translation

In a review of the German translation, Der Spiegel called The Discovery of Heaven a masterpiece that successfully captured the plight of the post-War generation in Europe, that "drags along its parents' crimes suffering for life". In the Netherlands, the novel's publication led critics to compare Mulisch with Thomas Mann and Robert Musil; a review in Trouw called it the work of a virtuoso, "amusing, yet also touching and exciting".

A 1997 New York Times review was less favorable, praising the book for its "novelistic bravura", but criticizing the "labyrinthine middle section" that "slows it nearly to a halt".

== Adaptation ==
In 2001 the book was made into a movie of the same name by Jeroen Krabbé. Mulisch allowed his novel be adapted for film on condition that the English comedian Stephen Fry play Onno Quist. Krabbé did not follow the book closely and removed some of the longer pieces, especially the friendship between Max and Onno and the youth of Quinten. He changed some events for dramatic reasons. This film is notable for being the film debut of Neil Newbon.
