= Erembodegem =

Village in Belgium

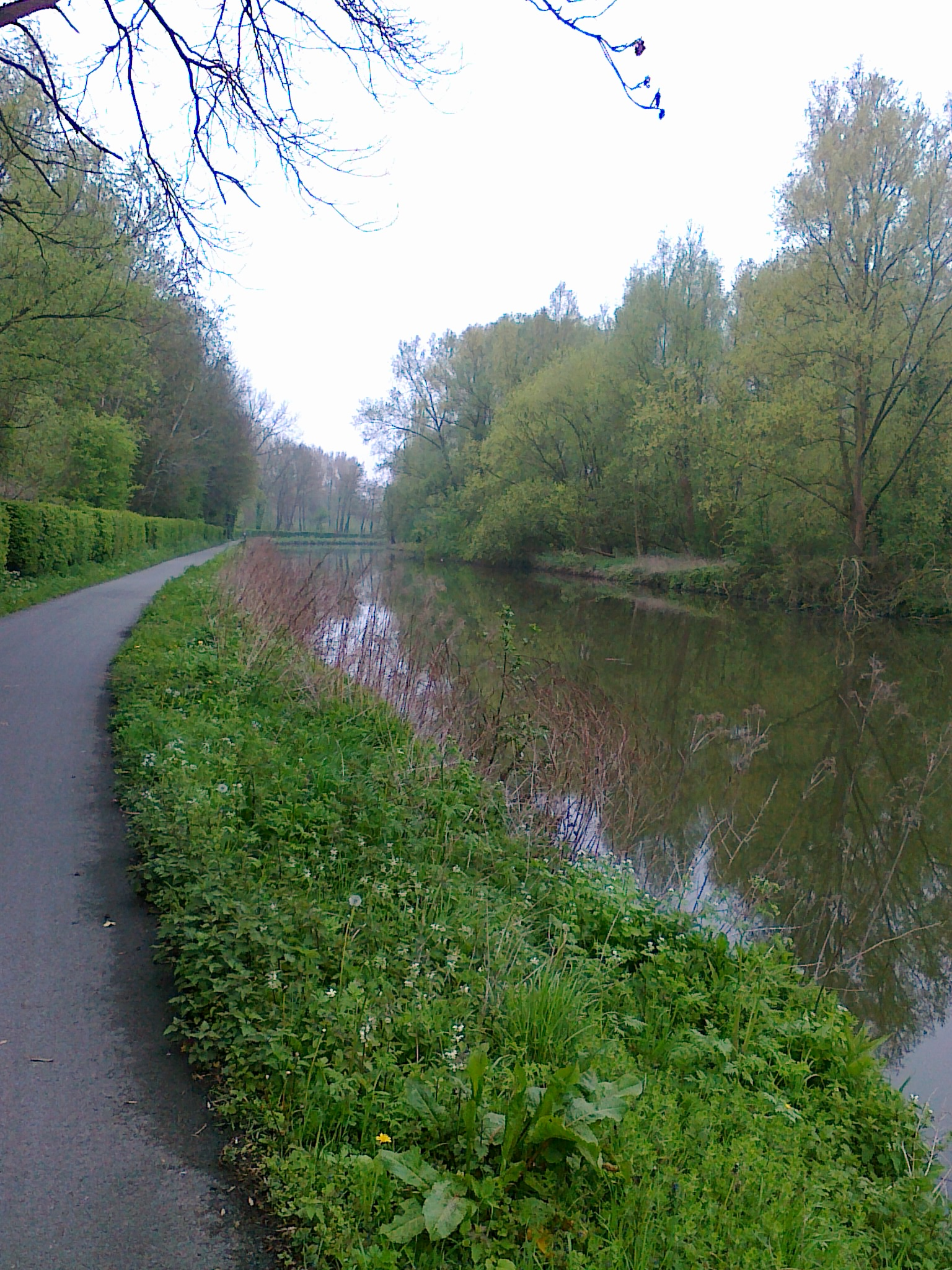
Path along the Dender on the Denderende Steden bicycle route

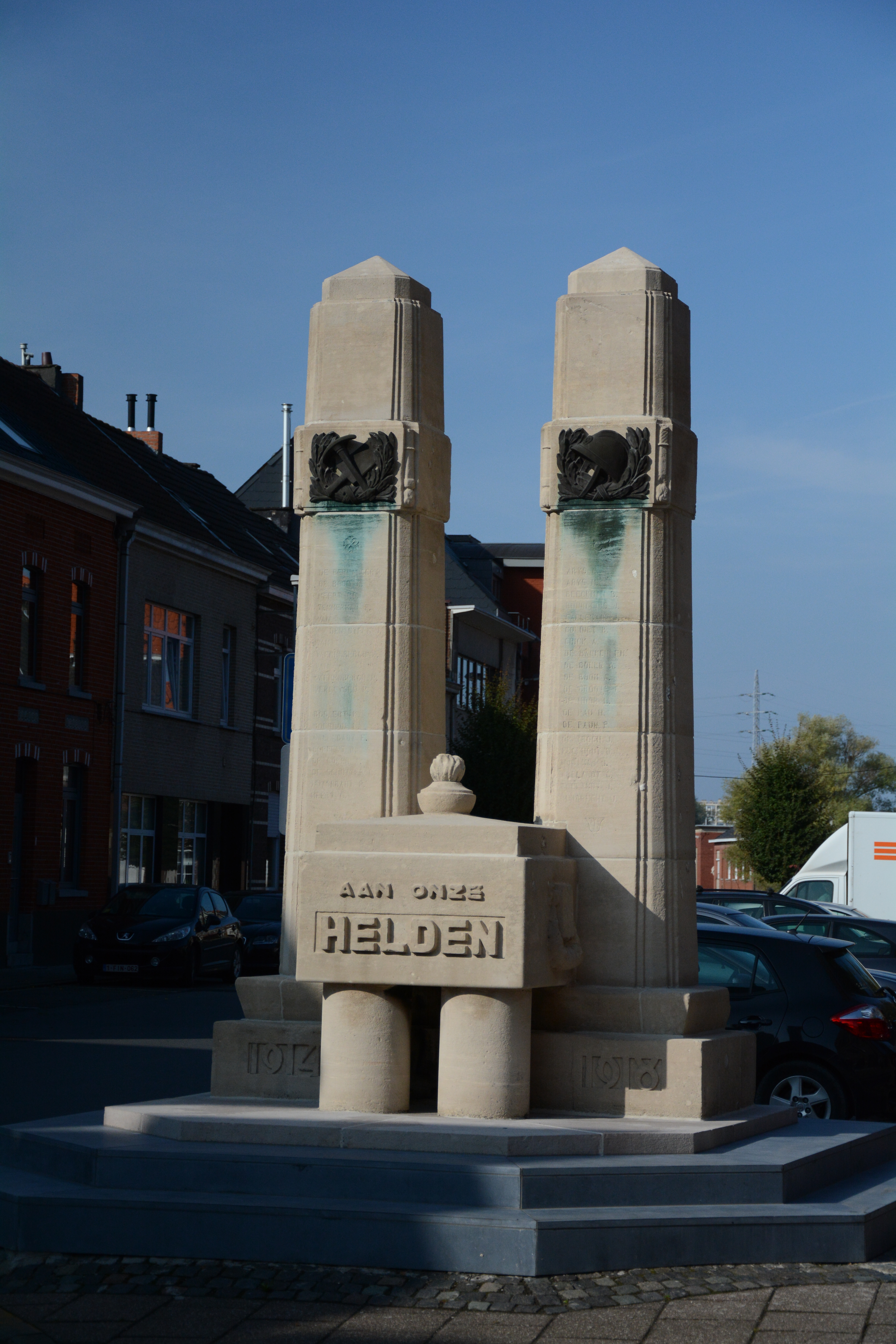
War memorial in Erembodegem

Erembodegem is a village in the Belgian province of East Flanders and is a submunicipality of Aalst. It was an independent municipality until the municipal reorganization of 1977. Erembodegem is located in the Denderstreek. The Dender flows through it. It measures 1178 ha and has 11804 inhabitants.

== History ==
Erembodegem was first mentioned in 1146 as Erembaldengem. The first population lived on the Dender and the Roman road Elewijt-Asse-Wervik. From 1227 it was one of the count's proper villages, which later came into the possession of several families. The parish (until 1602 together with Teralfene) was under the patronage of the Affligem Abbey. The foundations of the old church (burned down in 1582 and 1940) were excavated in 1943.
