= Louis Paul Boon =

Belgian writer (1912–1979)

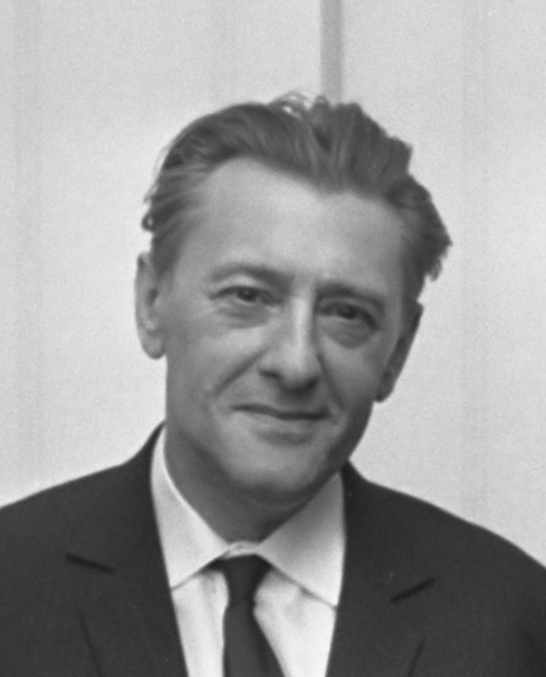
- Louis Paul Boon (1967)
- Born: Lodewijk Paul Aalbrecht Boon; 15 March 1912; Aalst, Belgium
- Died: 10 May 1979 (aged 67); Erembodegem, Belgium
- Occupations: author, poet, painter
- Known for: My Little War (1947); Chapel Road (1953); Menuet (1955); Pieter Daens (1971)

Lodewijk Paul Aalbrecht (Louis Paul) Boon (15 March 1912, in Aalst – 10 May 1979, in Erembodegem) was a Belgian writer of novels, poetry, pornography, columns and art criticism in Flemish. He was also a painter. He is best known for the novels My Little War (1947), the diptych Chapel Road (1953) / Summer in Termuren (1956), Menuet (1955) and Pieter Daens (1971).

== Biography ==
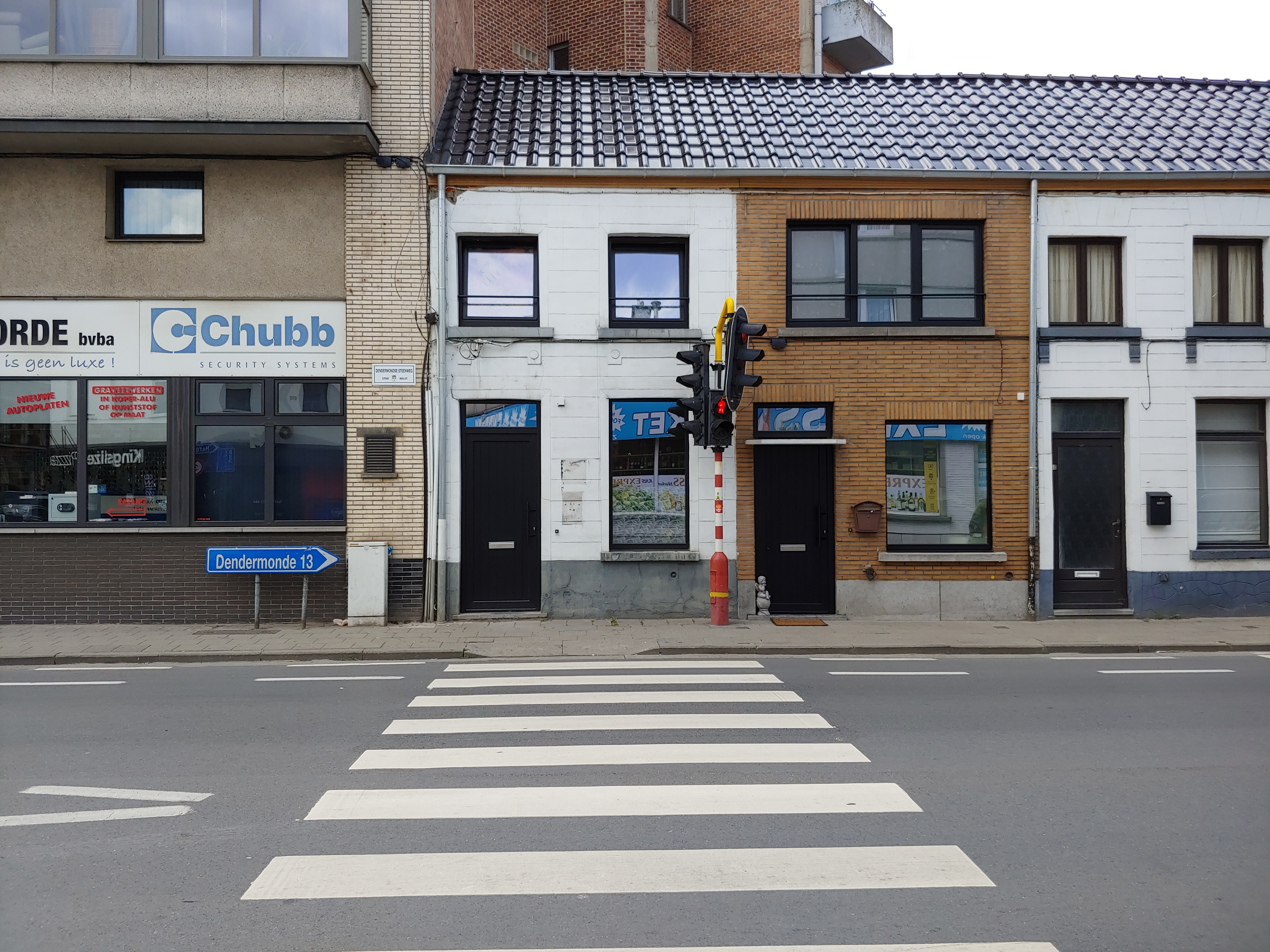
The birth-house of Boon, 2022, missing its commemorative plaque

He was born in 1912 as Lodewijk Paul Aalbrecht Boon in Aalst, Belgium, the oldest son in a working-class family. Although he was still very young during the First World War, memories of a German soldier shooting a prisoner would end up in later autobiographical work. Boon left school at age 16 to work for his father as a car painter. He was expelled from school for possession of forbidden books. During evenings and weekends he studied art at the Academy of Fine Arts, but soon had to abandon his studies due to lack of funds. In 1936 he married Jeanneke De Wolf. Three years later, their son Jo was born.

=== World War II ===
In September 1939, Boon was mobilised and stationed as a soldier in Gooik and Tessenderlo. Boon was moved to Veldwezelt at the outbreak of World War II in May 1940 in order to defend the Albert Canal. However, he was captured as a prisoner of war on the first day and eventually sent home, after a few weeks in a prisoner camp. His experiences during the War and mostly the Occupation are the subject of Boon's fourth book, My Little War (1947).

After writing an unpublished novel, Boon's official debut came in 1942 with De voorstad groeit (The suburb grows). It was awarded the Leo J. Krynprijs award at the recommendation of Willem Elsschot. His next novel was loosely based on the life of Vincent van Gogh, Abel Gholarts (1944, not available in translation).

=== After World War II ===
Boon started working as a journalist for the communist dailies De Rode Vaan (1945–1946), Front (1946–1947) and De Vlaamse Gids (1948). Together with Maurice Roggeman, he also made a comic strip, Proleetje & Fantast, for De Rode Vaan, for which he wrote storylines. Later he contributed to the newspaper Vooruit with which he established himself as a freelancer. In subsequent years, Boon continued to combine newspaper and literary work, and even added painting and sculpture to his activities. His literary output ranges from short prose, longer experimental novels, one man magazines, documentary and historical novels, poetry, erotic works and fairy tales.

Boon died in his home in Erembodegem in 1979 at the age of 67.

== My Little War ==
His experiences during World War II and the Occupation are the subject of Boon's fourth book, My Little War (1947, translation 2010 by Paul Vincent, Dalkey Archive Press). With this title Boon emerged for the first time as an important innovator of the novel. Rather than containing one story, "My Little War" contains over thirty loosely interrelated chapters, each containing a story that can be read as an independent piece. Most stories describe the difficult circumstances of life during the Occupation, such as finding food and fuel to warm the house, some deal with the deteriorating sexual mores, and some treat more direct war experiences such as bombings. Yet the overarching structure, though well hidden, makes for a coherent whole as well. The stories are interspersed with numerous raw fragments about equally raw incidents during the Occupation as the short stories: rape, theft, treason, humiliation. Boon admitted that the work of John Dos Passos provided the inspiration for this literary device. In this book, the term 'enemy' by no means signifies Germans exclusively, even though one story tells of the extermination of a Jewish girl and another of a camp prisoner's experiences. People are just as likely, if not more, to be robbed of food, money, or even their spouse's fidelity by their neighbours as they are by the Germans.

== Chapel Road ==
In 1953 he published the work that now stands as his greatest masterpiece, Chapel Road (De Kapellekensbaan, translated by Adrienne Dixon), which he began to write as early as 1943. Its dazzling construction combines several narrative threads, including an almost postmodern one where the writer and his friends discuss how the story should develop further. Another one is an extensive reworking of the most classic medieval work in the Dutch language, the twelfth-century story of Reynard the fox. There are several references to Chapel Road in Boon's lengthy 1956 novel Zomer te Ter-muren (Summer in Termuren), which picks up where the earlier novel left off.

== Legacy ==
Boon's literary legacy is a versatile, ranging from journalistic pieces on Belgian politics and society to erotic novelas. In historical novels such as De Bende van Jan de Lichte, De zoon van Jan de Lichte, De Zwarte Hand, and Daens, he depicted the oppression of the working class in 18th century Flanders; in his controversial Geuzenboek, he wrote about the Spanish domination of the Low Countries in the 16th century. Nearly all of Boon's work was infused by his profound commitment to socialism; in experimental, modernistic works such as Vergeten straat, Boon projected an ideal society but at the same time shared his doubts as to whether human nature could achieve utopia.

Two awards have been named after him: the Louis Paul Boonprijs for Arts and the literary award De Boon.

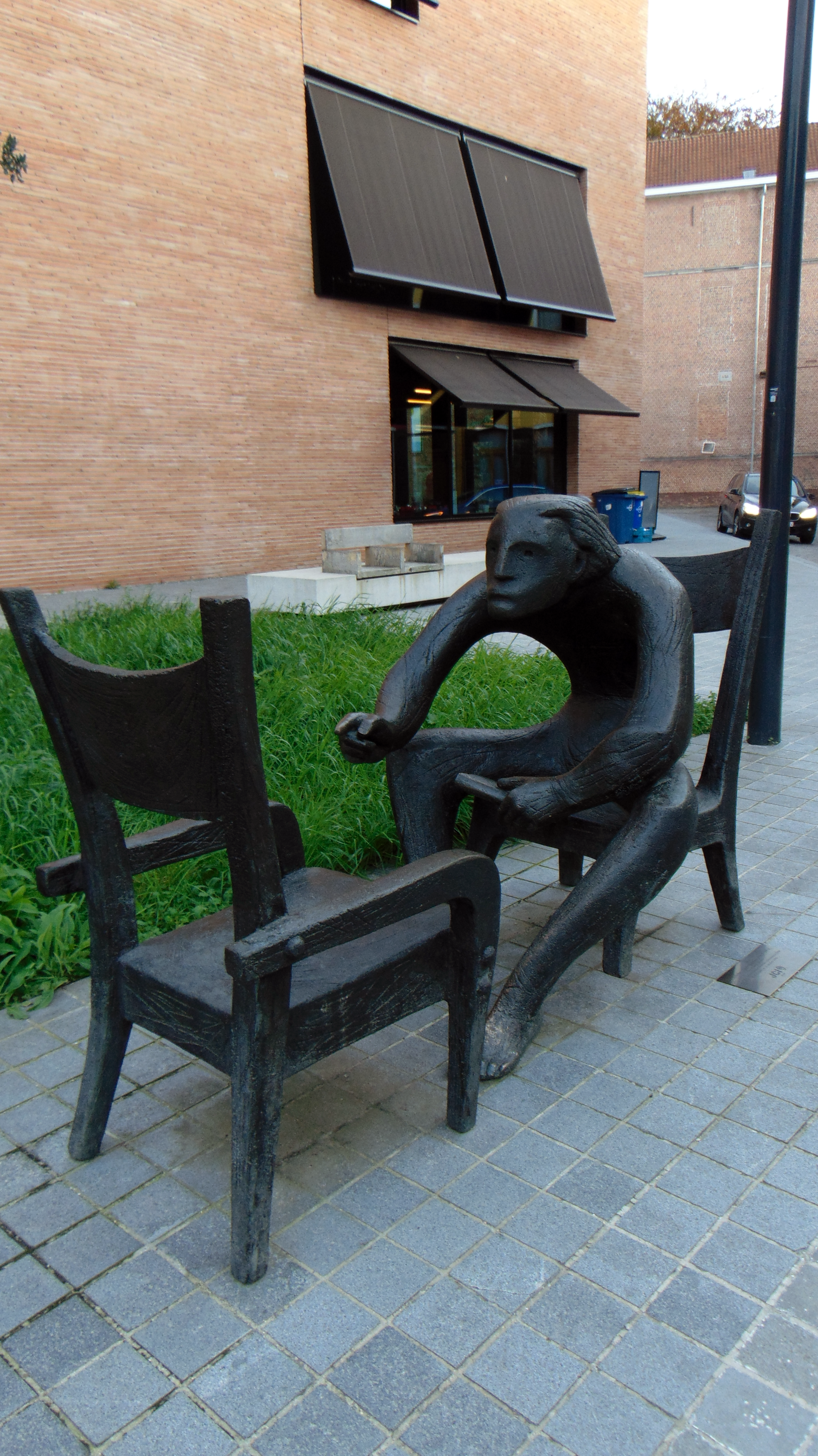
Statue of Louis Paul Boon

== Nobel Prize ==
Boon was thought to have been shortlisted for a Nobel Prize in Literature in the late 1970s, and even received an invitation to appear at the Swedish Embassy, probably to be told that the Prize had been awarded to him. The day before the appointment he died at his writing table of a heart attack. Very little of his writing has been translated into English, but De Kapellekensbaan and Zomer in Ter-Muren are both available in English translation from Dalkey Archive Press as Chapel Road and Summer in Termuren, and Paul Vincent's translation of Mijn kleine oorlog (as My Little War) was published by Dalkey in 2009.

== Selected bibliography ==
=== Translated in English ===
- My Little War (1946), translated by Paul Vincent, Dalkey Archive Press
- Chapel Road (1953), translated by Adrienne Dixon, Dalkey Archive Press
- Summer in Termuren (1956), translated by Paul Vincent, Dalkey Archive Press

=== Other selected works, not translated in English ===
- De voorstad groeit (1942), novel
- Abel Gholaerts (1944), novel
- Vergeten straat (1946), novel
- Boontje's reservaat (1954-1957), one-man magazine with documentary reports, stories, memories and essays
- Menuet (1955), novella
- De kleine Eva uit de Kromme Bijlstraat (1956), long-form, narrative poem. Awarded the Henriette Roland Holst-prize
- De bende van Jan de Lichte (1957), modern picaresque novel
- De paradijsvogel (1958), novel
- Blauwbaardje in Wonderland en andere grimmige sprookjes voor verdorven kinderen (1962), fairy tales
- Geniaal, maar met korte beentjes (1967), essays
- Pieter Daens of hoe in de negentiende eeuw de arbeiders van Aalst vochten tegen armoede en onrecht (1971), historical novel. Awarded the Multatuli-prize
- Mieke Maaike's obscene jeugd (1972), pornographic novella
- De zwarte hand, of het anarchisme van de negentiende eeuw in het industriestadje Aalst (1976), historical novel
- Het geuzenboek (1979), historical novel

== See also ==
- Flemish literature
