= Hugo Claus =

Belgian author (1929–2008)

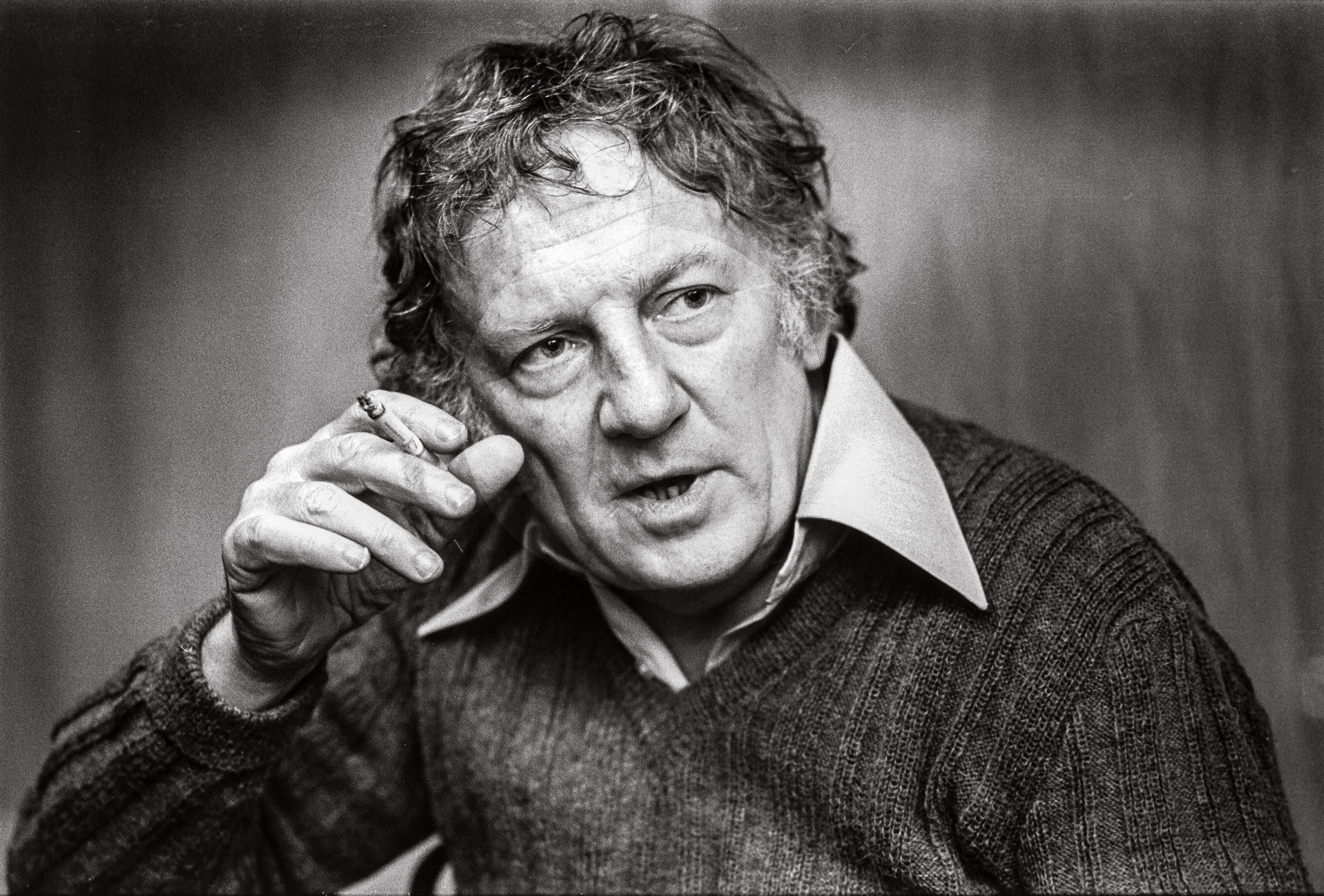
- Claus in 1984
- Born: Hugo Maurice Julien Claus; 5 April 1929; Bruges, Belgium
- Died: 19 March 2008 (aged 78); Antwerp, Belgium
- Occupations: Playwright, novelist, poet, painter, film director
- Spouse(s): Elly Overzier; Veerle de Wit
- Writing career
- Pen name: Dorothea van Male; Jan Hyoens; Thea Streiner
- Notable work: The Sorrow of Belgium

Hugo Maurice Julien Claus (Dutch pronunciation: [ˈɦyɣoː ˈklʌus]; 5 April 1929 – 19 March 2008) was a leading Belgian author who published under his own name as well as various pseudonyms. Claus' literary contributions spanned the genres of drama, novels, and poetry; he also left a legacy as a painter and film director. He wrote primarily in Dutch, although he also wrote some poetry in English. He won the 2000 International Nonino Prize in Italy.

His death by euthanasia, which is legal in Belgium, led to considerable controversy.

== Life ==
Hugo Claus was born on 5 April 1929 at Sint-Janshospitaal in Bruges, Belgium. He was the eldest of four sons born to Jozef Claus and Germaine Vanderlinden. Jozef worked as a printer but was also fond of theatre.

Hugo was educated at a boarding school led by nuns in Aalbeke and experienced the German occupation of Belgium during World War II. The experience was formative, and would later be adapted by Claus into his semi-autobiographical The Sorrow of Belgium (1983). Many of Claus' teachers were Flemish nationalists who were sympathetic to fascism, and Claus joined the pro-German youth wing of the Flemish National Union. His father was also briefly detained after the Liberation for collaborationism. A sympathizer of the political left at a more mature period in his life, Claus lauded the socialist model after a visit to Cuba in the 1960s.

Claus' prominence in literary circles and his debut as a novelist came in 1950, with the publication of his De Metsiers at age twenty-one. His first published poems had in fact been printed by his father as early as 1947. He lived in Paris from 1950 until 1952, where he met many of the members of the CoBrA art movement.

From February 1953 until the beginning of 1955, Hugo Claus lived in Italy where his girlfriend Elly Overzier (born in 1928) acted in a few films. They were married on 31 May 1955, and had a son, Thomas, on 7 October 1963.

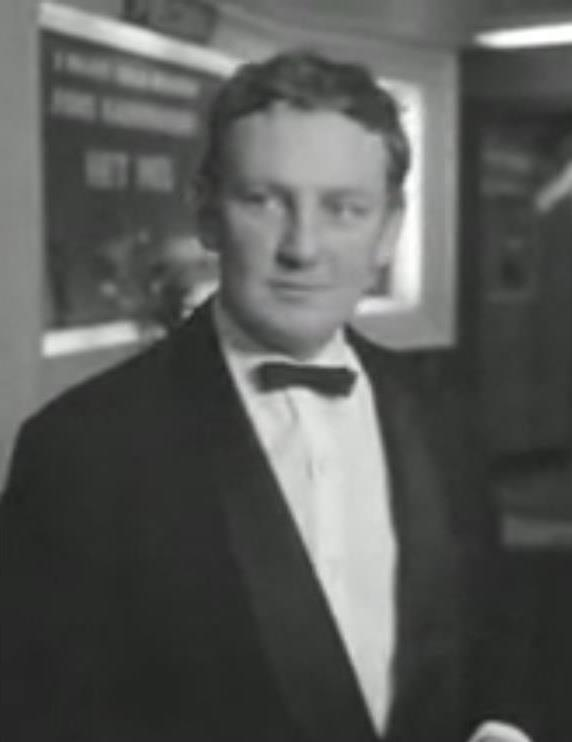
Claus at the premiere of Het Mes, Amsterdam, 1961

In the early 1970s, he had an affair with actress Sylvia Kristel, who was 23 years younger, with whom he had a son, Arthur, in 1975. They lived in the Raamgracht 5–7 building in Amsterdam. The relationship ended in 1977, when she left him for actor Ian McShane.

He was a "contrarian", of "anarchist spirit". Journalist Guy Duplat recalls that Claus had organized in Knokke the election of a "Miss Knokke Festival", which was a typical beauty contest, except for the Claus ruling that the members of the all-male jury would have to be naked.

=== Literary career ===
Hugo Claus was considered to be one of the most important contemporary Belgian authors. Claus published the novel Schola Nostra (1971) under the pseudonym Dorothea Van Male. He also used the pseudonyms Jan Hyoens and Thea Streiner. The 1962 De verwondering (The Astonishment) and the 1983 Het verdriet van België (The Sorrow of Belgium) rank among Claus' most significant works as a novelist. Lee views Het verdriet van België as a postmodern critique of national identity.

Most prolific in literary endeavours as a dramatist, Claus wrote 35 original pieces and 31 translations from English, Greek, Latin, French and Spanish plays and novels. His dramatic sketch Masscheroen was first staged at Knokke Casino and featured an all-nude cast: three naked men were given the task of portraying the Christian Holy Trinity of God the Father, God the Son, and the Holy Spirit; the work also made light of the Holy Virgin, a Belgian saint, and the Three Wise Men. Attacked as blasphemous and deleterious to the public's moral well-being, the light-hearted play's performance triggered a notable legal case in which Claus was prosecuted: convicted on charges of public indecency, Claus was ordered to pay a ten-thousand-Belgian franc fine and serve a four-month prison sentence. The prison term was reduced to a suspended sentence after a public outcry.

Claus also wrote the script of a satirical comic strip, "De Avonturen van Belgman" ("The Adventures of Belgian Man") in 1967, which spoofed the Belgian bi-lingual troubles. The strip itself was drawn by artist Hugoké (Hugo de Kempeneer). In 1985, Claus also wrote a series of satirical poems about Pope John Paul II's upcoming visit to Belgium that year, titled Een Weerzinwekkend Bezoek. The poems were illustrated with cartoons by GAL.

Hugo Claus' name had been put forward many times for the Nobel Prize in Literature, on which he would casually comment "this prize money would suit me fine".

=== Painting and film ===
As a painter, Claus was a participant in the CoBrA art movement from 1950. He had developed friendships with some of its members and illustrated a book by Pierre Alechinsky in 1949. He collaborated with key figures in the movement including Karel Appel and Corneille and participated in some exhibitions. He later used his experiences of this time in his book Een zachte vernieling (Mild Destruction).

Claus wrote the screenplay for the 1966 film, De dans van de reiger (Dance of the Heron) which he adapted from his own 1962 stage play, self subtitled 'a macabre comedy in two parts.' It was directed by Fons Rademakers.

Claus directed seven films between 1964 and 2001. De Vijanden (The Enemies), a 1968 film about an American soldier, a German soldier and a young Flemish man wandering around in the midst of the 1944 Ardennes Offensive, was co-written by him. His film Het sacrament was screened in the Un Certain Regard section at the 1990 Cannes Film Festival.

=== Death ===
Claus suffered from Alzheimer's disease and requested his life to be terminated through euthanasia, which is a legal procedure in Belgium, at the Middelheim Hospital in Antwerp on 19 March 2008.

Bert Anciaux, then Flemish Minister of Culture, stated "I knew him well enough to know that he wanted to depart with pride and dignity." Former Belgian Prime Minister Guy Verhofstadt said that he imagined the onset of Alzheimer's must have been "inevitable and unbearable torture". "I can live with the fact that he decided thus," he said, "because he left us as a great glowing star, right on time, just before he would have collapsed into a Stellar black hole."

His death by euthanasia has received criticism from the Roman Catholic Church and the Belgian Alzheimer League. The Roman Catholic Church criticized the media coverage; Belgian Cardinal Godfried Danneels referred to Claus' euthanasia in his Easter Homily. The Belgian Alzheimer League respects Claus' decision, but believes the media coverage of his death neglects other options for Alzheimer's patients.

== Prizes ==
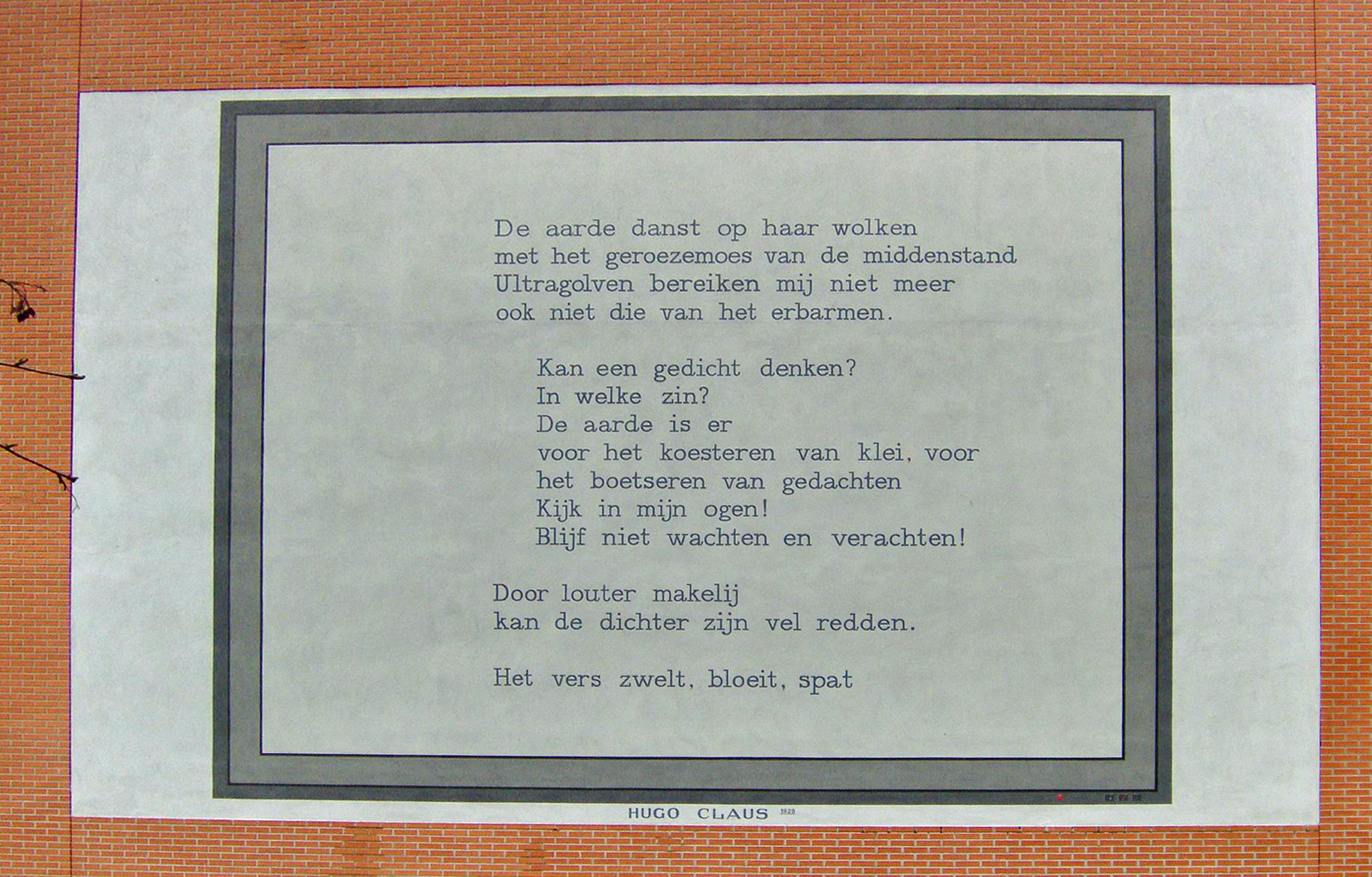
Poem by Hugo Claus as a wall poem in Leiden

Amongst others:

- 1950 – Leo J. Krynprijs for De Metsiers
- 1952 – Arkprijs van het Vrije Woord for De Metsiers
- 1964 – August Beernaertprize for De verwondering
- 1965 – Henriëtte Roland Holst-prize for all his plays
- 1967 – Edmond Hustinxprize for all his plays
- 1979 – Constantijn Huygens Prize
- 1985 – Cestoda-prize
- 1986 – Herman Gorterprize for Alibi
- 1986 – Prijs der Nederlandse Letteren
- 1994 – Prijs voor Meesterschap for his complete oeuvre
- 1994 – VSB Poetry Prize for De Sporen
- 1997 – Libris Prize for De Geruchten
- 1998 – Aristeion Prize for De Geruchten
- 2000 – International Nonino Prize for La sofferenza del Belgio

== Bibliography ==
Claus wrote over a thousand pages of poetry, more than sixty plays, over twenty novels and several essays, film scripts, libretti and translations. Only a small part of this œuvre has been translated into English:

- Prose:
  - The Duck Hunt, 1955 (De Metsiers, 1950)
  - Sister of Earth, 1970 (De Metsiers, 1950)
  - The Sorrow of Belgium, 1990 (Het verdriet van België, 1983) (ISBN 1-58567-238-6)
  - The Swordfish, 1996 (De Zwaardvis, 1989) (ISBN 0-7206-0985-2)
  - Desire, 1997 (Het verlangen, 1978) (ISBN 0-14-025538-9)
  - Wonder, 2009 (De verwondering, 1962) (ISBN 978-0-9800330-1-4)
- Poetry:
  - with Karel Appel: Love Song, 1963 (written in English)
  - Four Flemish Poets: Hugo Claus, Gust Gils, Paul Snoek, Hugues C. Pernath / edited by Peter Nijmeijer. (1976) (ISBN 0856820342)
  - with Pierre Alechinsky and Karel Appel: Two-brush paintings: Their poems by Hugo Claus, 1980 (Zwart, 1978)
  - An Evening of postwar poetry of the Netherlands and Flanders [sound recording]: Hugo Claus, Judith Herzberg, Gerrit Kouwenaar, and Cees Nooteboom reading their poems, 1984
  - Selected Poems 1953–1973, 1986
  - The Sign of the Hamster, 1985 (Het teken van de Hamster, 1964) (ISBN 9071345130)
  - Greetings: selected poems, 2004 (ISBN 0151009007)
  - Even Now, selected and translated by David Colmer, 2013
- Theatre:
  - Friday, 1972 (Vrijdag, 1968) (ISBN 0706700511)
  - Four Works for the Theatre, 1980 (ISBN 0-9666152-1-2)
  - Friday, 1993 (Vrijdag, 1968)
  - The sacrament and other plays of forbidden love, 2007 (ISBN 9781575911106)
- Essay:
  - Karel Appel, Painter, 1963 (Karel Appel, Schilder, 1964)

== See also ==
- Belgian literature
