= Harry Mulisch =

Dutch writer

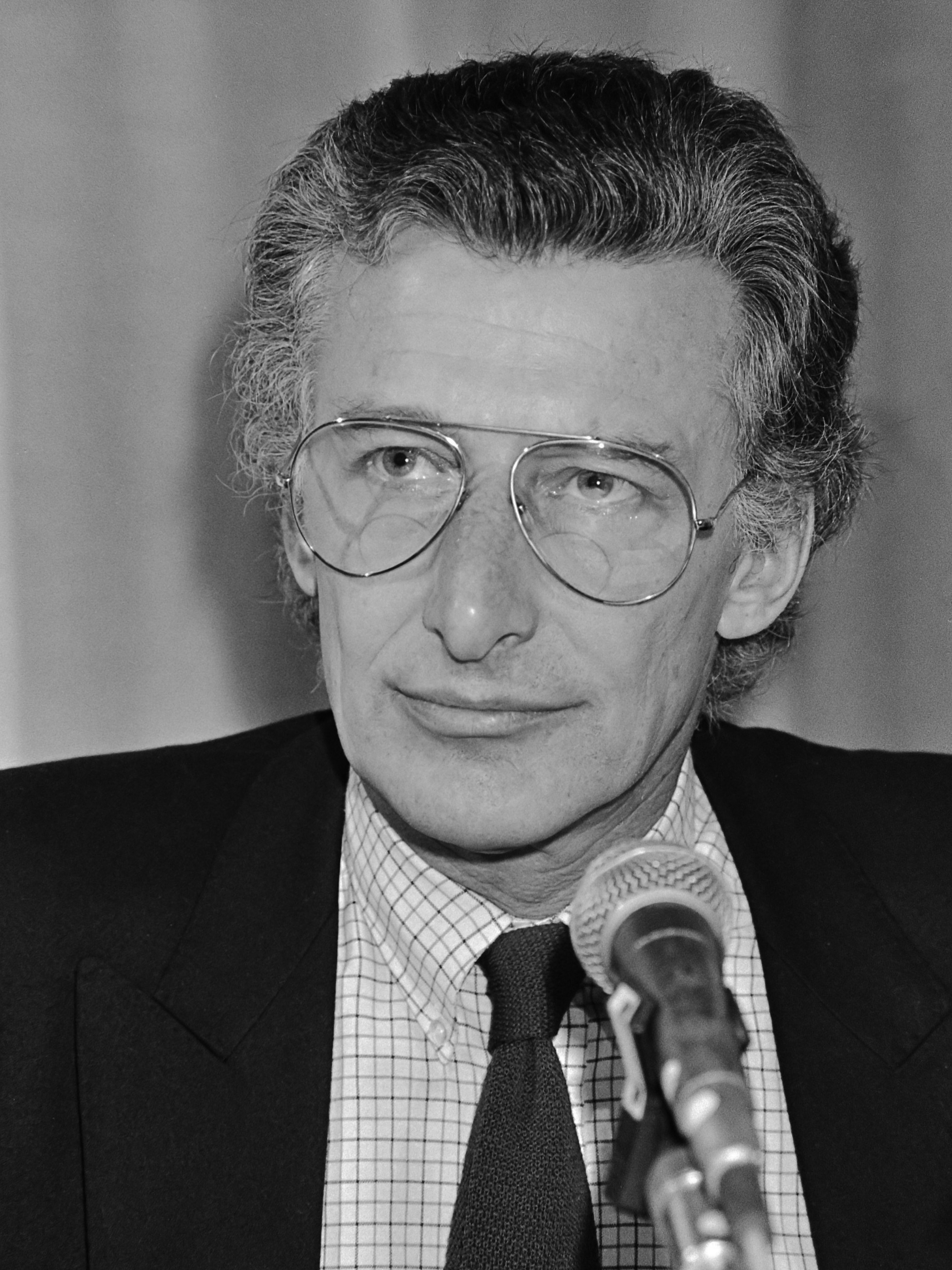
- Mulisch in 1981
- Born: Harry Kurt Victor Mulisch; 29 July 1927; Haarlem, Netherlands
- Died: 30 October 2010 (aged 83); Amsterdam, Netherlands
- Resting place: Zorgvlied, Amsterdam
- Occupation: Writer
- Spouse: Sjoerdje Woudenberg (m. 1971)
- Partner: Kitty Saal
- Children: Anna (1971); Frieda (1974); Menzo (1992)
- Writing career
- Language: Dutch
- Period: 1952–2001
- Genres: Novels, plays, essays, poems
- Notable work: The Discovery of Heaven (1992)
- Notable awards: List
- Movements: Jewish mysticism; Greek mythology (Homer, Sophocles, etc.)
- Website: mulisch.nl

Harry Kurt Victor Mulisch (Dutch pronunciation: [ˈɦɑri ˈmulɪɕ]; 29 July 1927 – 30 October 2010) was a Dutch writer. He wrote more than 80 novels, plays, essays, poems, and philosophical reflections. Mulisch's works have been translated into 38 languages.

Along with Willem Frederik Hermans and Gerard Reve, Mulisch is considered one of the "Great Three" (De Grote Drie) of Dutch postwar literature. His novel The Assault (1982) was adapted into a film that won both a Golden Globe and an Academy Award. Mulisch's work is also popular among the country's public: a 2007 poll of NRC Handelsblad readers voted his novel The Discovery of Heaven (1992) the greatest Dutch book ever written. He was regularly mentioned as a possible future Nobel laureate. He won the 2007 International Nonino Prize in Italy.

== Life ==
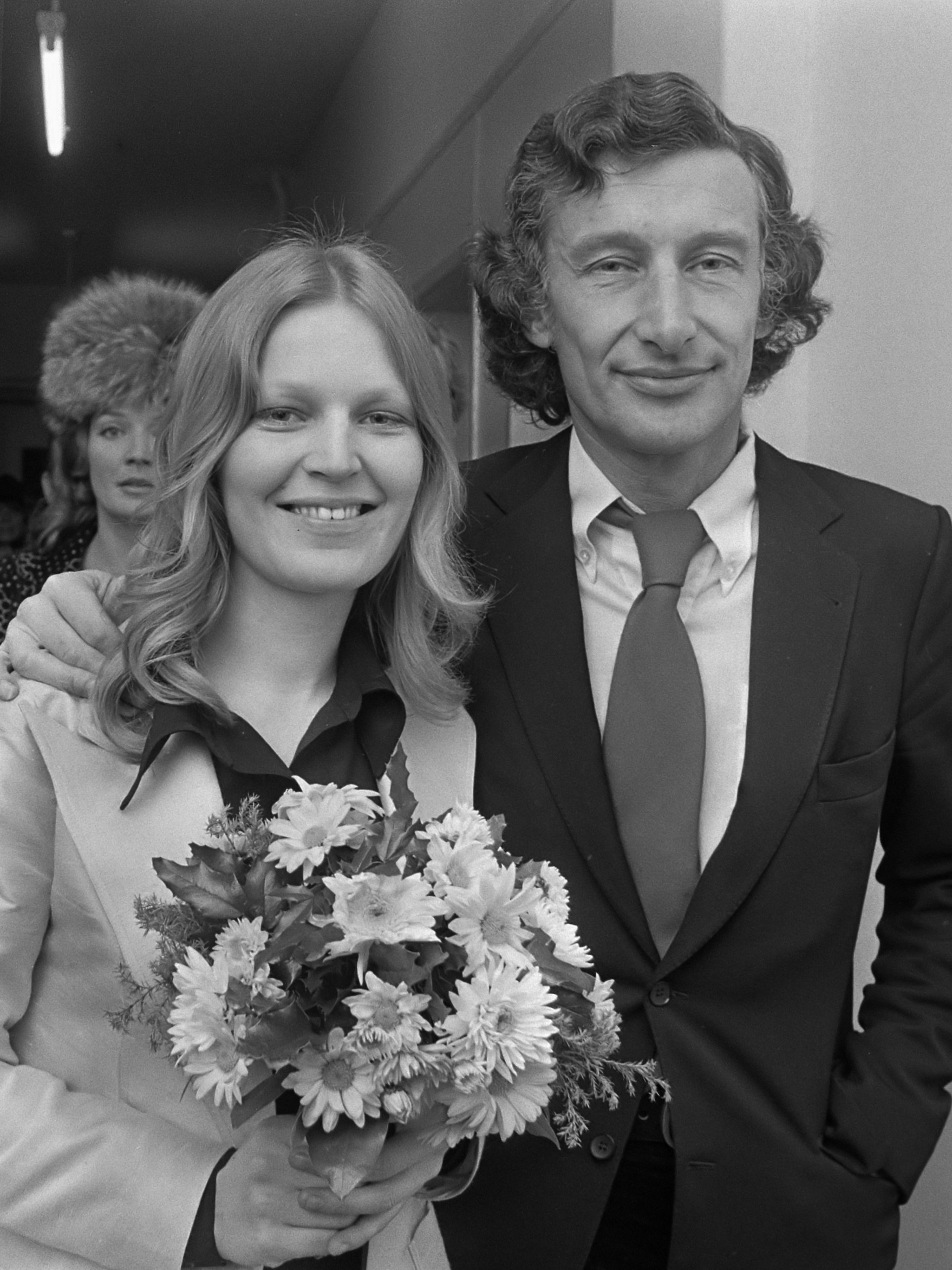
Harry Mulisch and Sjoerdje Woudenberg on their wedding day in 1971

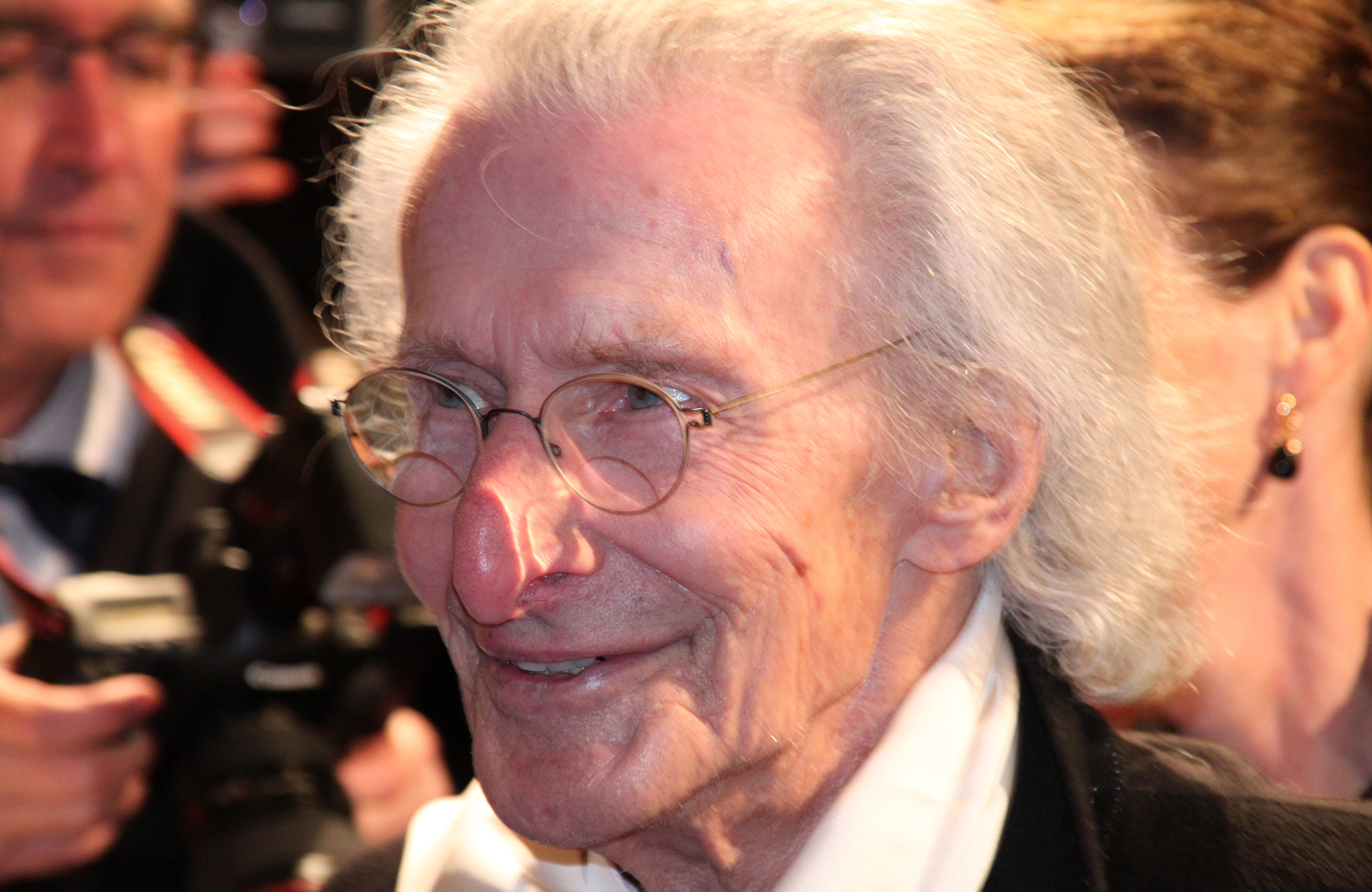
Mulisch in 2010

Harry Kurt Victor Mulisch was born on 29 July 1927 in Haarlem in the Netherlands. Mulisch's father was from Austria-Hungary and emigrated to the Netherlands after the First World War. During the German occupation in World War II his father worked for a German bank which also dealt with confiscated Jewish assets. His mother, Alice Schwarz, was Jewish. Mulisch and his mother escaped transportation to a concentration camp thanks to Mulisch's father's collaboration with the Nazis, but his maternal grandmother was killed in a gas chamber. Mulisch was raised largely by his parents' housemaid, Frieda Falk. Mulisch said of himself, he did not just write about World War II, he was WWII.

Mulisch lived in Amsterdam from 1958 until his death in 2010.

Mulisch had two daughters, his daughters Frieda and Anna, with his wife Sjoerdje Woudenberg, and a son, Menzo, from his relationship with Kitty Saal.

=== Death ===
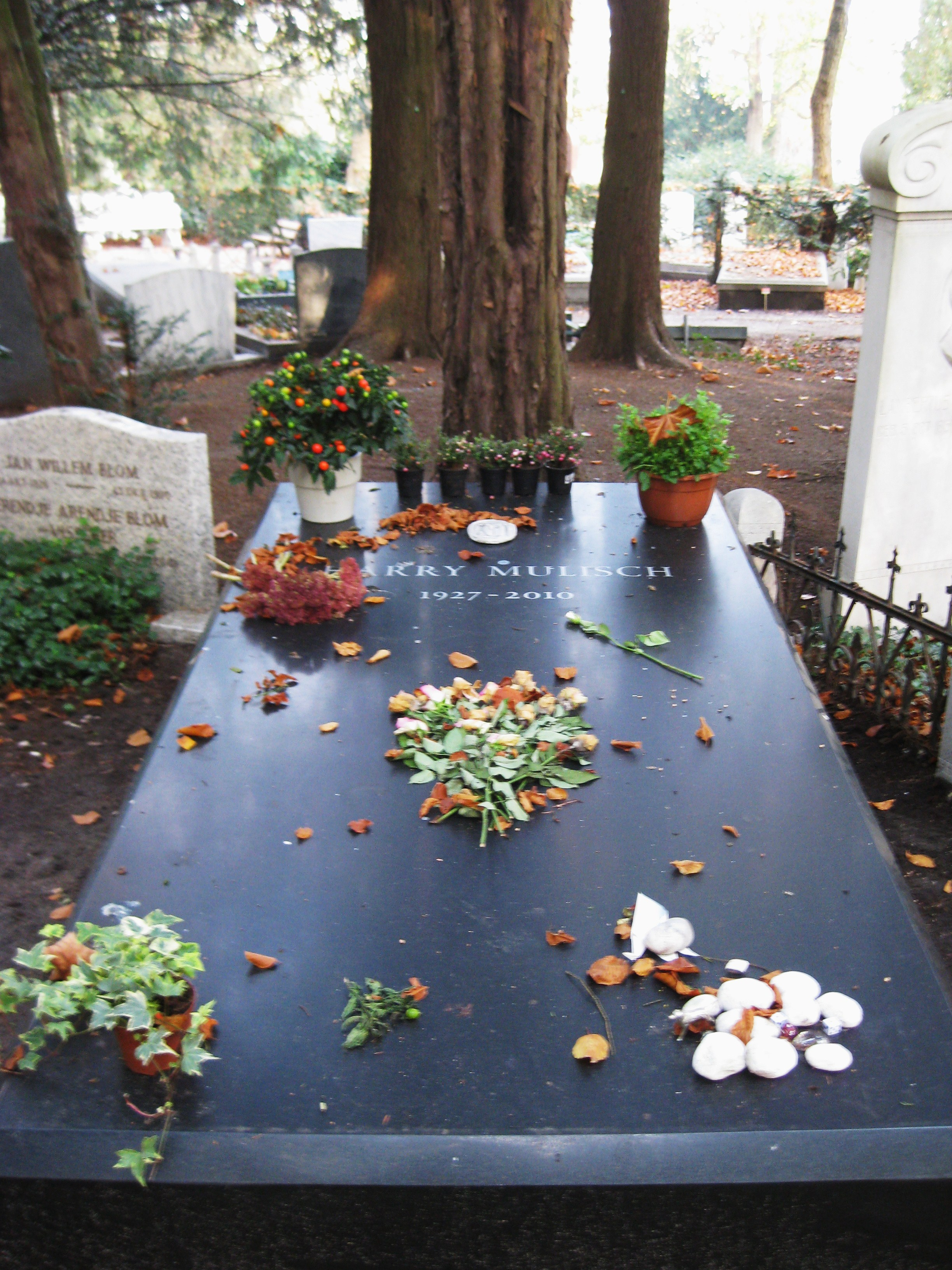
Harry Mulisch' grave at Zorgvlied in 2011

Mulisch died in 2010. His death occurred at his Amsterdam home and his family was with him at the time. Dutch prime minister Mark Rutte described his death as "a loss for Dutch literature and the Netherlands". Culture minister Halbe Zijlstra bemoaned the demise of the "Big Three" as Gerard Reve and Willem Frederik Hermans had already died. Marlise Simons of The New York Times said his "gift for writing with clarity about moral and philosophical themes made him an enormously influential figure in the Netherlands and earned him recognition abroad". The L Magazine's Mark Ashe quoted the American editions of his novels by referring to him as "Holland's Greatest Author" and "Holland's most important postwar writer".

== Works ==
Mulisch gained international recognition with the film The Assault (1986), based on his book of the same title (1982). It received an Oscar and a Golden Globe for best foreign movie and has been translated into more than twenty languages.

His novel The Discovery of Heaven (1992) is considered his masterpiece and was voted "the best Dutch-language book ever" by Dutch readers in a 2007 newspaper poll. "It is the book that shaped our generation; it made us love, even obsess, with reading", said Peter-Paul Spanjaard, 32, a lawyer in Amsterdam at the time of Mulisch's death. It was filmed in 2001 as The Discovery of Heaven by Jeroen Krabbé, starring Stephen Fry.

Among the many awards he received for individual works and his total body of work, the most important is the Prijs der Nederlandse Letteren (Prize of Dutch Literature, a lifetime achievement award) in 1995.

== Themes in his work ==
A frequent theme in his work is the Second World War. His father had worked for the Germans during the war and went to prison for three years afterwards. As the war spanned most of Mulisch's formative phase, it had a defining influence on his life and work. In 1961, Mulisch travelled twice to Israel as a reporter for Elseviers Weekblad to cover the Eichmann trial; seventeen of his articles on the proceedings appeared between April and December. He expanded this material into the nonfiction reportage De Zaak 40/61, published in 1962. Major works set against the backdrop of the Second World War are De Aanslag (The Assault), Het stenen bruidsbed, and Siegfried.

Mulisch often incorporated ancient legends or myths in his writings, drawing on Greek mythology (e.g. in De Elementen), Jewish mysticism (in De ontdekking van de Hemel and De Procedure), well known urban legends and politics

Mulisch was politically left-wing, once signing a book "dedicated in admiration" to Fidel Castro.

In 1984, he delivered the Huizinga Lecture in Leiden, the Netherlands, under the title Het Ene (The Unifying Principle).

== Bibliography ==
- Archibald Strohalm (1952; novel)
- Tussen hamer en aambeeld ("Between hammer and anvil", 1952; novella)
- Chantage op het leven ("Blackmail on life", 1953; short story)
- De Diamant ("The Diamond", 1954; novel)
- De Sprong der Paarden en de Zoete Zee ("The Jump of Horses and the Sweet Sea", 1955; novel)
- Het mirakel ("The miracle", 1955; short stories)
- Het Zwarte licht ("The Black Light", 1957; novel)
- Manifesten ("Manifestos", 1958; essays)
- Het Stenen Bruidsbed ("The Stone Bridal Bed", 1959; novel)
- Tanchelijn (1960; play)
- De knop ("The button", 1961; play)
- Voer voor Psychologen ("Food for psychologists", 1961; autobiography)
- Wenken voor de bescherming van uw gezin en uzelf, tijdens de Jongste Dag ("Tips for the Protection of Your Family and Yourself During the Last Judgment"), 1961; essays)
- De Zaak 40/61 ("Criminal Case 40/61", 1962; report on the Eichmann trial)
- Bericht aan de Rattenkoning ("Message to the Rat King", 1966; essay on the Provos revolts in Amsterdam in the 1960s)
- Wenken voor de Jongste Dag ("Tips for the Last Judgment", 1967; essays)
- Het woord bij de daad ("The word added to the deed", 1968; essays)
- Reconstructie ("Reconstruction", 1969; essays)
- Paralipomena Orphica ("Paralipomena Orphica", 1970; essays)
- De Verteller ("The Narrator", 1970; novel)
- De Verteller verteld: Kommentaar, Katalogus, Kuriosa en een Katastrofestuk ("The Narrator being narrated: Comments, Catalogue, Curiosities and a Piece of Catastrophe, 1971; essay on The Narrator)
- De toekomst van gisteren ("Yesterday's future", 1972; essay on a book the author cannot write)
- Oidipous Oidipous (1972; play)
- Woorden, woorden, woorden ("Words, words, words", 1973; poetry)
- De vogels ("The Birds", 1974; poetry)
- Mijn Getijdenboek ("My book of hours") (1975; autobiography)
- Tegenlicht (1975; poetry)
- Kind en Kraai (1975; poetry)
- Twee Vrouwen ("Two Women", 1975; novel) (filmed as Twice a Woman in 1979)
- De wijn is drinkbaar dankzij het glas (1976; poetry)
- Oude Lucht (1977; stories)
- De Compositie van de Wereld (1980; a philosophical system)
- Opus Gran (1982; poetry)
- De Aanslag (The Assault, 1982; novel); see above.
- De Kamer (1984; stories)
- Hoogste Tijd ("Last Call", 1985; novel);
- De Pupil ("The Pupil", 1987; novel)
- De Elementen ("The Elements", 1988; novel)
- Het beeld en de klok (1989; short story)
- De Ontdekking van de Hemel (The Discovery of Heaven, 1992; novel)
- De Procedure ("The Procedure", 1999; novel)
- Het Theater, de brief en de waarheid ("The Theatre, the Letter and the Truth", 2000; novel); "Boekenweekgeschenk".
- Siegfried (2001; novel)
- De tijd zelf ("Time Itself", 2011; unfinished novel, published posthumously)
- De ontdekking van Moskou ("The Discovery of Moscow", 2015; unfinished novel, published posthumously)
- Ik kan niet dood zijn (2020, notes and aphorisms, collected by Kitty Saal and Johan Kuiper, published posthumously)

== Honours and awards ==
=== Honours ===
- 1977: Knight of the Order of Orange-Nassau (Netherlands)
- 1992: Officer of the Order of Orange-Nassau (Netherlands)
- 1997: Commander of the Order of the Netherlands Lion
- 2001: Knight of the Order of Arts and Letters (France)
- 2002: Officer's Cross of the Order of Merit of the Federal Republic of Germany

=== Awards ===
- 1951: Reina Prinsen Geerligs Award, for the novel "archibald strohalm"
- 1957: De Bijenkorf Literary Award, for the novel "The Black Light"
- 1957: Anne Frank Award, for the novel "archibald strohalm"
- 1961: Athos Prize, for lifetime achievement
- 1961: ANV-Visser Neerlandia Prize, for the play "Tanchelijn"
- 1963: Vijverberg Prize, for the report "Criminal Case 40/61"
- 1977: Constantijn Huygens Prize, for lifetime achievement
- 1977: Cestoda Prize
- 1977: P. C. Hooft Award, for lifetime achievement
- 1986: Deep Sea Award, for the novel "The Assault"
- 1993: Multatuli Prize, for the novel "The Discovery of Heaven"
- 1993: Mecca Award, for the novel "The Discovery of Heaven"
- 1995: Dutch Literature Prize, for his whole oeuvre
- 1999: Libris Prize, for the novel The procedure
- 1999: Prix Jean Monnet de Littérature Européenne, French prize for the novel "The Discovery of Heaven"
- 2003: Inktaap prize, for the novel "Siegfried"
- 2003: Premio Flaiano, Italian prize for literature
- 2007: Prix européen des jeunes lecteurs, French prize for the novel "Siegfried"
- 2007: Honorary Doctorate from the University of Amsterdam
- 2007: International Nonino Prize, Italian prize for literature
- 2007: shortlisted for the International Booker Prize.
- 2007: Prize for best Dutch novel of all time, for the novel "The Discovery of Heaven"
- 2009: Golden Century Award, for his entire oeuvre

=== Planetoid ===
Mulisch was honoured with a planetoid in his name on 12 October 2006 (see 10251 Mulisch)
