= Dutch-language literature =

Dutch-language literature comprises all writings of literary merit written in the Dutch language, a product of the Netherlands, Belgium (see also literature of Flanders), Suriname, the Netherlands Antilles and of formerly Dutch-speaking regions, such as French Flanders, South Africa, and Indonesia. The Dutch East Indies, as Indonesia was called under Dutch colonization, spawned a separate subsection in Dutch-language literature. Conversely, Dutch-language literature sometimes was and is produced by people originally from abroad who came to live in Dutch-speaking regions, such as Anne Frank and Kader Abdolah. In its earliest stages, Dutch-language literature is defined as those pieces of literary merit written in one of the Dutch dialects of the Low Countries. Before the 17th century, there was no unified standard language; the dialects that are considered Dutch evolved from Old Frankish. A separate Afrikaans literature started to emerge during the 19th century, and it shares the same literary roots as contemporary Dutch, as Afrikaans evolved from 17th-century Dutch. The term Dutch literature may either indicate in a narrow sense literature from the Netherlands, or alternatively Dutch-language literature (as it is understood in this article).

== Overview ==
Until the end of the 11th century, Dutch literature, like literature elsewhere in Europe, was almost entirely oral and in the form of poetry. In the 12th and 13th century, writers starting writing chivalric romances and hagiographies for noblemen. From the 13th century, literature became more didactic and developed a proto-national character, as it was written for the bourgeoisie. With the close of the 13th century a change appeared in Dutch literature. The Flemish and Hollandic towns began to prosper and a new sort of literary expression began. Around 1440, literary guilds called rederijkerskamers ("Chambers of Rhetoric") arose which were usually middle-class in tone. Of these chambers, the earliest were almost entirely engaged in preparing mysteries and miracle plays for the people. Anna Bijns (c. 1494–1575) is an important figure who wrote in modern Dutch. The Reformation appeared in Dutch literature in a collection of Psalm translations in 1540 and in a 1566 New Testament translation in Dutch. The greatest of all Dutch writers is widely considered to be the playwright and poet Joost van den Vondel (1587–1679).

During the late eighteenth and early nineteenth century, the Low Countries had gone through major political upheaval. The most prominent writers of this era were Willem Bilderdijk (1756–1831), Hiëronymus van Alphen (1746–1803), and Rhijnvis Feith (1753–1824). Piet Paaltjens (ps. of François Haverschmidt, 1835–1894) represents in Dutch the Romantic vein exemplified by Heine. A new movement developed called Tachtigers or "Movement of (Eighteen-)Eighty", after the decade in which it arose. One of the most important historical writers of the 20th century was Johan Huizinga, who is known abroad and translated in different languages and included in several great books lists. During the 1920s, a new group of writers who distanced themselves from the ornate style of the Movement of 1880 arose, led by Nescio (J.H.F. Grönloh, 1882–1961). During WW II, influential writers included Anne Frank (whose diary was published posthumously), who died in a German concentration camp, as did crime fiction writer, journalist and poet Jan Campert. Writers who had lived through the atrocities of the Second World War reflected in their works on the changed perception of reality. Obviously many looked back on their experiences the way Anne Frank had done in her Diary, this was the case with Het bittere kruid (The bitter herb) of Marga Minco, and Kinderjaren (Childhood) of Jona Oberski. The renewal, which in literary history would be described as "ontluisterend realisme" (shocking realism), is mainly associated with three authors: Gerard Reve, W.F. Hermans and Anna Blaman. Reve and Hermans are often cited together with Harry Mulisch as the "Big Three" of Dutch postwar literature.

== Old Dutch texts (500–1150) ==
Around 500 AD, Old Frankish evolved to Old Dutch, a West Germanic language that was spoken by the Franks and to a lesser extent by people living in the regions conquered by the Franks. Until the end of the 11th century, Dutch literature - like literature elsewhere in Europe - was almost entirely oral and in the form of poetry, as this helped troubadours remembering and reciting their texts. Scientific and religious texts were written in Latin and as a consequence most texts written in the Netherlands were written in Latin rather than Old Dutch. Extant Dutch texts from this period are rare.

In the earliest stages of the Dutch language, a considerable degree of mutual intelligibility with most other West Germanic dialects was present, and some fragments and authors can be claimed by both Dutch and German literature. Examples include the 10th-century Wachtendonck Psalms, a West Low Franconian translation of some of the Psalms on the threshold of what is considered Dutch, and the 12th-century County of Loon poet Henric van Veldeke (1150 – after 1184).

=== The Leiden Willeram ===
The Leiden Willeram is a manuscript containing a Low Franconian version of the Old High German commentary on Song of Solomon by the German abbot Williram of Ebersberg (ultimately by Isidore of Seville). Until recently, based on its orthography and phonology the text of this manuscript was believed by most scholars to be Middle Franconian, that is Old High German, with some Limburgic or otherwise Franconian admixtures. But in 1974, the German philologist Willy Sanders proved in his study Der Leidener Willeram that the text actually represents an imperfect attempt by a scribe from the northwestern coastal area of the Low Countries to translate the East Franconian original into his local vernacular. The text contains many Old Dutch words not known in Old High German, as well as mistranslated words caused by the scribe's unfamiliarity with some Old High German words in the original he translated, and a confused orthography heavily influenced by the Old High German original. For instance, the grapheme <z> is used after the High German tradition where it represents Germanic t shifted to /ts/. Sanders also proved that the manuscript, now in the University Library of Leiden University, was written at the end of the 11th century in the Abbey of Egmond in modern North Holland, whence the manuscript's other name Egmond Willeram.

=== Hebban olla vogala ===
The oldest known poetry was written by a West-Flemish monk in a convent in Rochester, England, around 1100: hebban olla vogala nestas hagunnan hinase hic enda thu wat unbidan we nu ("All birds have started making nests, except me and you, what are we waiting for"). According to professor Luc de Grauwe the text could equally well be Old English, more specifically Old Kentish, though there is no consensus on this hypothesis. At that time, Old (West) Dutch and Old English were very similar.

=== The Rhinelandic Rhyming Bible ===
Another important source for Old Dutch is the so-called Rhinelandic Rhyming Bible (Dutch: Rijnlandse Rijmbijbel and German: Rheinische Reimbibel). This is a verse translation of biblical histories, attested only in a series of fragments, which was composed in a mixed dialect containing Low German, Old Dutch and High German (Rhine-Franconian) elements. It was likely composed in north-west Germany in the early 12th century, possibly in Werden Abbey, near Essen.

== Middle Dutch literature (1150–1500) ==
In the 12th and 13th century, writers starting writing chivalric romances and hagiographies (i.e. stories about the lives of saints) for paying noblemen. From the 13th century, literature became more didactic and developed a proto-national character. The primary audience was no longer the nobility, but the bourgeoisie. The growing importance of the Southern Low Countries resulted in most works being written in Brabant, Flanders and Limburg.

In the first stages of Dutch literature, poetry was the predominant form of literary expression. It was both in the Low Countries and the rest of Europe that courtly romance and poetry were popular literary genres during the Middle Ages. One Minnesanger was the aforementioned Van Veldeke, the first Dutch-language writer known by name, who also wrote epic poetry and hagiographies. The chivalric romance was a popular genre as well, often featuring King Arthur or Charlemagne as protagonist.

As the political and cultural emphasis at the time lay in the southern provinces, most of the works handed down from the early Middle Ages were written in southern Low Franconian dialects such as Limburgish, Flemish and Brabantic. The first Dutch language writer known by name is Van Veldeke, who wrote courtly love poetry, and epics.

Beatrice of Nazareth (1200–1268) was the first known prose writer in the Dutch language, the author of the Seven Ways of Holy Love. The Brussels friar Jan van Ruusbroec (better known in English as the Blessed John of Ruysbroeck, 1293/4–1381) followed Beatrice in taking prose out of the economic and political realms and using it for literary purposes. He wrote sermons filled with mystic thought.

A number of the surviving Dutch language epic works, especially the courtly romances, were copies from or expansions of earlier German or French efforts, but there are examples of truly original works (such as the anonymous Karel ende Elegast) and even Dutch-language works that formed the basis for version in other languages (such as the morality play Elckerlijc that formed the basis for Everyman). Another genre popular in the Middle Ages was the fable, and the most elaborate fable produced by Dutch literature was an expanded adaptation of the Reynard the Fox tale, Vanden vos Reynaerde ("Of Reynard the Fox"), written around 1250 by a person only identified as Willem.

Until the 13th century, the Middle Dutch language output mainly serviced the aristocratic and monastic orders, recording the traditions of chivalry and of religion, but scarcely addressed the bulk of the population. With the close of the 13th century a change appeared in Dutch literature. The Flemish and Hollandic towns began to prosper and to assert their commercial supremacy over the North Sea, and these cities won privileges amounting almost to political independence. With this liberty there arose a new sort of literary expression.

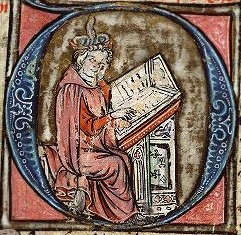
Jacob van Maerlant

The most important exponent of this new development was Jacob van Maerlant (~1235–~1300), a Flemish scholar who worked in Holland for part of his career. His key works are Der Naturen Bloeme ("The Flower of Nature", c. 1263), a collection of moral and satirical addresses to all classes of society, and De Spieghel Historiael ("The Mirror of History", c. 1284). Jacob van Maerlant straddles the cultural divide between the northern and southern provinces. Up until now, the northern provinces had produced little of worth, and this would largely remain the case until the fall of Antwerp during the Eighty Years' War shifted focus to Amsterdam. He is sometimes referred to as the "father of Dutch poetry", "a title he merits for productivity if for no other reason."

Around 1440, literary guilds called rederijkerskamers ("Chambers of Rhetoric") arose. These guilds, whose members called themselves Rederijkers or "Rhetoricians", were in almost all cases middle-class in tone, and opposed to aristocratic ideas and tendencies in thought. Of these chambers, the earliest were almost entirely engaged in preparing mysteries and miracle plays for the people. Soon their influence grew until no festival or procession could take place in a town unless the Chamber patronized it. The Chambers' plays very rarely dealt with historical or even Biblical personages, but entirely with allegorical and moral abstractions and were didactic in nature. The most notable examples of Rederijker theatre include Mariken van Nieumeghen ("Mary of Nijmegen") and Elckerlijc (which was translated into English as Everyman).

At the close of the early period, Anna Bijns (c. 1494–1575) stands as a transitional figure. Bijns was an Antwerp schoolmistress and lay nun whose main targets were the faith and character of Luther. In her first volume of poetry (1528) the Lutherans are scarcely mentioned and focus lies on her personal experience of faith, but in that of 1538 one finds sharp words for the Lutherans on every page. With the writings of Bijns, the period of Middle Dutch closes and the modern Dutch begins (see also History of the Dutch language).

== Renaissance and the Golden Age (1550–1670) ==
The first ripples of the Reformation appeared in Dutch literature in a collection of Psalm translations printed at Antwerp in 1540 under the title of Souter-Liedekens ("Psalter Songs"). For the Protestant congregations, Jan Utenhove printed a volume of Psalms in 1566 and made the first attempt at a New Testament translation in Dutch. Very different in tone were the battle songs sung by the Reformers, the Gueux songs. The famous songbook of 1588, Een Geusen Lied Boecxken ("A Gueux Songbook"), was full of heroic sentiment.

Philips van Marnix, lord of Sint-Aldegonde (1538–1598) was one of the leading spirits in the war of Dutch independence and an intimate friend of William I, Prince of Orange. The lyrics to Wilhelmus van Nassouwe, the current Dutch national anthem and an apology of the Prince's actions composed around 1568, are ascribed to Marnix. His chief work was 1569's Biëncorf der Heilige Roomsche Kercke (Beehive of the Holy Roman Church), a satire of the Roman Catholic church. Marnix occupied the last years of his life in preparing a Dutch version of the Bible, translated directly from the original; at his death only Genesis was completed. In 1619 the Synod of Dort placed the unfinished work in the hands of four theologians, who completed it. This translation formed the starting point for the Statenvertaling or "States' Translation", a full Bible translation into Dutch ordered by the Synod. In order to be intelligible to all Dutchmen, the Statenvertaling included elements of all main Dutch dialects and so became the cornerstone of modern standard Dutch.

Dirck Volckertszoon Coornhert (1522–1590) was the Low Countries' first truly humanist writer. In 1586 he produced his original masterpiece, the Zedekunst ("Art of Ethics"), a philosophical treatise in prose. Coornhert's humanism unites the Bible, Plutarch and Marcus Aurelius in one grand system of ethics.

By this time, the religious and political upheaval in the Low Countries had resulted in the 1581 Act of Abjuration, deposing their king, Philip II of Spain and the subsequent eighty years' struggle to confirm that declaration. As a result, the southern provinces, some of which had supported the declaration, were separated from the northern provinces as they remained under Spanish rule. Ultimately, this would result in the present-day states of Belgium (south) and the Netherlands (north). After Antwerp had fallen into Spanish hands in 1585, Amsterdam became the centre of all literary enterprise as all intelligentsia fled towards the north. This meant both a cultural renaissance in the north and a sharp decline in the south at the same time, regarding the level of Dutch literature practised. The north received a cultural and intellectual boost whereas in the south, Dutch was largely replaced by French as the language of culture and administration.

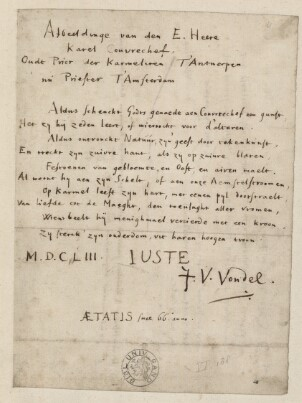
Poem written by Joost van den Vondel, 17th century.

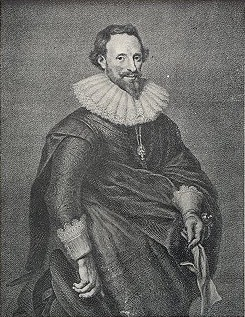
P.C. Hooft

In Amsterdam, a circle of poets and playwrights formed around Maecenas-like figure Roemer Visscher (1547–1620), which would eventually be known as the Muiderkring ("Circle of Muiden") after the residence of its most prominent member, Pieter Corneliszoon Hooft (1581–1647), writer of pastoral and lyric poetry and history. From 1628 to 1642 he wrote his masterpiece, the Nederduytsche Historiën ("History of the Netherlands"). Hooft was a purist in style, modelling himself (in prose) after Tacitus. He is considered one of the greatest historians, not merely of the Low Countries, but of Europe. His influence in standardising the language of his country is considered enormous, as many writers conformed themselves to the stylistic and grammatical model Hooft devised. Other members of his Circle included Visscher's daughter Tesselschade (1594–1649, lyric poetry) and Gerbrand Adriaensz Bredero (1585–1618, romantic plays and comedies), whose best-known piece is De Spaansche Brabanber Jerolimo ("Jerolimo, the Spanish Brabanter"), a satire upon the refugees from the south. A versatile poet loosely associated with the Circle of Muiden was the diplomat Constantijn Huygens (1596–1687), perhaps best known for his witty epigrams. Huygens' style was bright and vivacious and he was a consummate artist in metrical form.

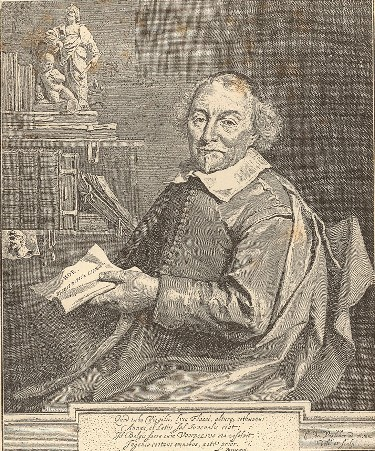
Joost van den Vondel

The greatest of all Dutch writers is widely considered to be the playwright and poet Joost van den Vondel (1587–1679), who mainly wrote historical and biblical tragedies. In 1625 he published what seemed an innocent study from the antique, his tragedy of Palamedes, or Murdered Innocence, but which was a thinly veiled tribute to Johan van Oldebarnevelt, the Republic's Grand Pensionary, who had been executed in 1618 by order of stadtholder Maurice of Nassau. Vondel became in a week the most famous writer in the Netherlands and for the next twelve years, until the accession of stadtholder Frederick Henry, had to maintain a hand-to-hand combat with the Calvinists of Dordrecht. In 1637 Vondel wrote of his most popular works on the occasion of the opening of a new Amsterdam theatre: Gijsbrecht van Aemstel, a play on a local historical figure loosely modeled on material from the Aeneid that is still staged to this day. In 1654 Vondel brought out what most consider the best of all his works, the tragedy of Lucifer, from which it is said Milton drew inspiration. Vondel is considered the typical example of Dutch creativity and imagination at their highest development.

A similar school to that in Amsterdam arose in Middelburg, the capital of Zeeland, led by Jacob Cats (1577–1660). In Cats the genuine Dutch habit of thought, the utilitarian and didactic spirit reached its zenith of fluency and popularity. During early middle life he produced the most important of his writings, his didactic poems, the Maechdenplicht ("Duty of Maidens") and the Sinne- en Minnebeelden ("Images of Allegory and Love"). In 1624 he moved from Middelburg to Dordrecht, where he soon after published his ethical work called Houwelick ("Marriage"); and this was followed by an entire series of moral pieces. Cats is considered somewhat dull and prosaic by some, yet his popularity with the middle classes in the Netherlands has always been immense.

As with contemporary English literature, the predominant forms of literature produced in this era were poetry and drama, Coornhert (philosophy) and Hooft (history) being the main exceptions. In another prose genre, Johan van Heemskerk (1597–1656) was the leading man of a new vogue blown over from France: the romance. In 1637 he produced his Batavische Arcadia ("Batavian Arcadia"), the first original Dutch romance, in its day extremely popular and widely imitated. Another exponent of this genre was Nikolaes Heinsius the Younger, whose Mirandor (1695) resembles but precedes Lesage's Gil Blas.

The period from 1600 to 1650 was the blossoming time in Dutch literature. During this period the names of greatest genius were first made known to the public and the vigour and grace of literary expression reached their highest development. It happened, however, that three men of particularly commanding talent survived to an extreme old age, and under the shadow of Vondel, Cats and Huygens sprang up a new generation which sustained the great tradition until around 1670, when decline set in sharply.

== 1670–1795 ==
After the great division of the Low Countries into the Dutch Republic and the Spanish Netherlands formalised in the Peace of Westphalia (1648), "Dutch literature" almost exclusively meant "Republican literature", as the Dutch language fell into disfavour with the southern rulers. A notable exception was the Dunkirk writer Michiel de Swaen (1654–1707), who wrote comedies, moralities and biblical poetry. During his lifetime (1678) the Spanish lost Dunkirk to the French and so De Swaen is also the first French-Flemish writer of importance.

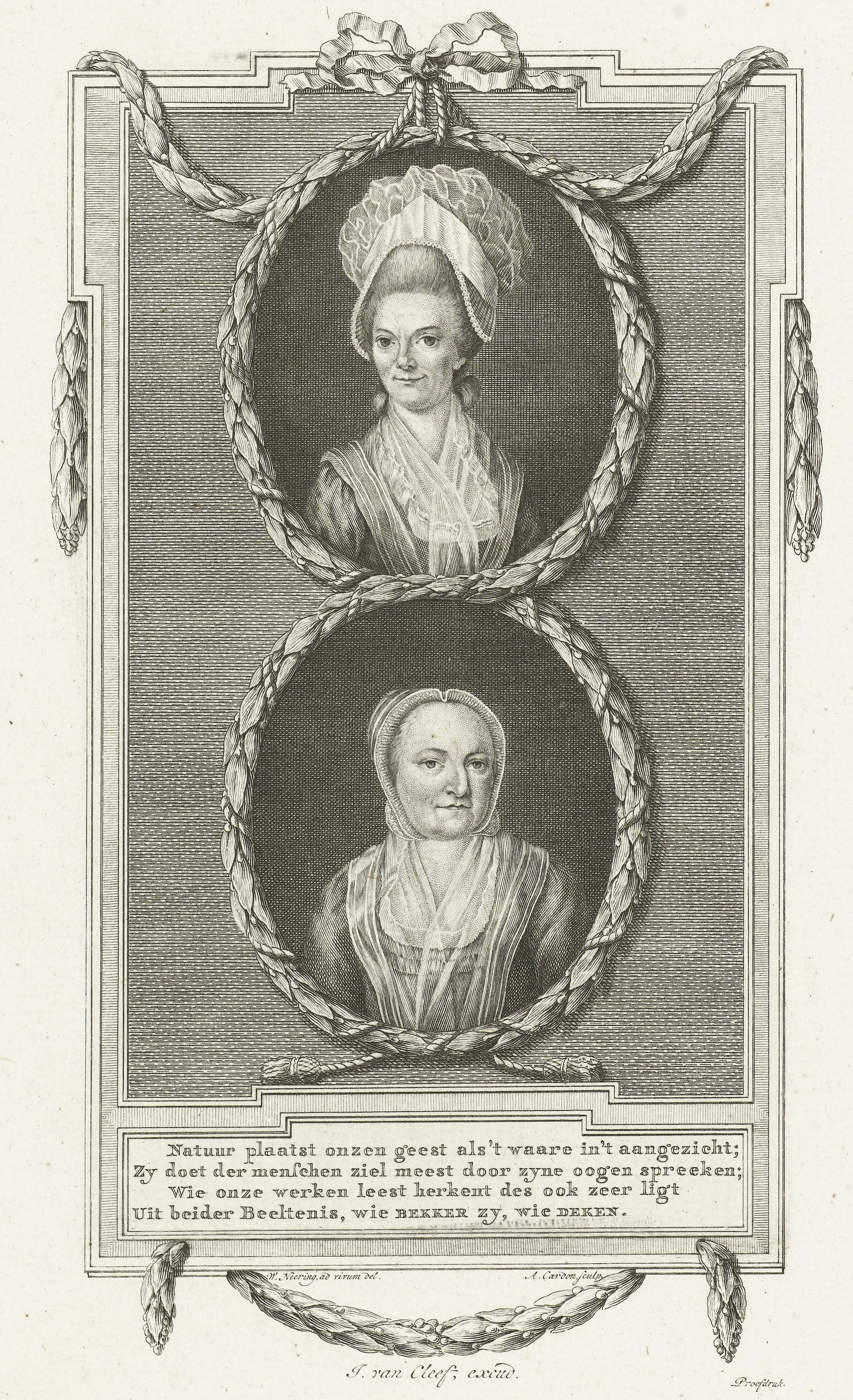
Betje Wolff (top) and Aagje Deken

The playwrights of the time followed the French model of Corneille and others, led by Andries Pels (d. 1681). A well-known poet of this period was Jan Luyken (1649–1712). A writer who revived especially an interest in literature was Justus van Effen (1684–1735). He was born at Utrecht and was influenced by Huguenot émigrés who had fled for the Republic after the revocation of the Edict of Nantes in 1685. Van Effen wrote in French for a great part of his literary career but, influenced by a visit to London where the Tatler and Spectator were on the rise, from 1731 began to publish his Hollandsche Spectator ("Dutch Spectator") magazine, which his death in 1735 soon brought to a close. Still, what he composed during the last four years of his life is considered by many to constitute the most valuable legacy to Dutch literature that the middle of the 18th century left behind.

The year 1777 is considered a turning point in the history of letters in the Netherlands. It was in that year that Elizabeth “Betje” Wolff (1738–1804), a widow lady in Amsterdam, persuaded her friend Agatha “Aagje” Deken (1741–1804), a poor but intelligent governess, to throw up her situation and live with her. For nearly thirty years these women continued together, writing in combination. In 1782 the ladies, inspired partly by Goethe, published their first novel, Sara Burgerhart, which was enthusiastically received. Two further, less successful novels appeared before Wolff and Deken had to flee France, their country of residence, due to persecution by the Directory.

The last years of the 18th century were marked by a general revival of intellectual force. The romantic movement in Germany made itself deeply felt in all branches of Dutch literature and German lyricism took the place hitherto held by French classicism, in spite of the country falling to French expansionism (see also History of the Netherlands).

== 19th century ==
During the late eighteenth and early nineteenth century, the Low Countries had gone through major political upheaval. The Spanish Netherlands had first become the Austrian Netherlands before being annexed by France in 1795. The Republic saw a revolution inspired and backed by France that led to the Batavian Republic and Kingdom of Holland vassal states before actual French annexation in 1810. After Napoleon's downfall in the Southern Netherlands village of Waterloo, the northern and southern provinces were briefly united as the United Kingdom of the Netherlands. This period lasted until 1830 only, when the southern provinces seceded to form Belgium. It had little influence in literature, and in the new state of Belgium, the status of the Dutch language remained largely unchanged as all governmental and educational affairs were conducted in French.

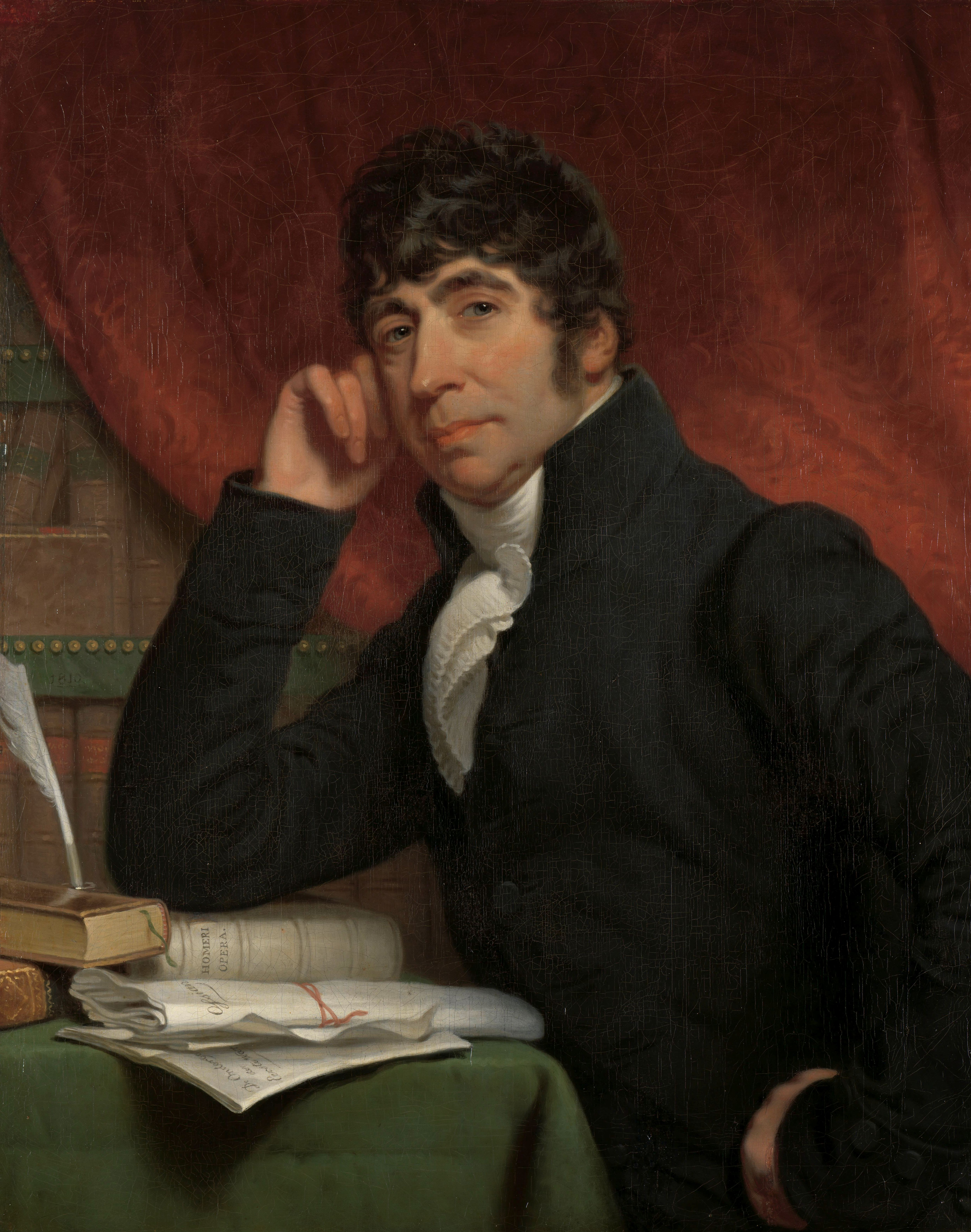
Portrait of Willem Bilderdijk by Charles Howard Hodges from 1810

Against this backdrop, the most prominent writer was Willem Bilderdijk (1756–1831), a highly intellectual and intelligent but also eccentric man who lived a busy, eventful life, writing great quantities of verse. Bilderdijk had no time for the emerging new romantic style of poetry, but its fervour found its way into the Netherlands nevertheless, first of all in the person of Hiëronymus van Alphen (1746–1803), who today is best remembered for the verses he wrote for children. Van Alphen was an exponent of the more sentimental school along with Rhijnvis Feith (1753–1824), whose romances are steeped in Weltschmerz.

In Hendrik Tollens (1780–1856) some the power of Bilderdijk and the sweetness of Feith were combined. Tollens wrote nationalistic romances and lyrics celebrating the great deeds of Dutch history and today is best known for his poem "Wien Neêrlands Bloed" ("To Those in Whom Dutch Blood Flows"), which was the Dutch national anthem until it was superseded in 1932 by Marnix' "Wilhelmus". A poet of considerable talent, whose powers were awakened by personal intercourse with Tollens and his followers, was A. C. W. Staring (1767–1840). His poems are a blend of romanticism and rationalism.

The Dutch language of the north resisted the pressure of German from the outside and from within broke through its long stagnation and enriched itself, as a medium for literary expression, with a multitude of fresh and colloquial forms. At the same time, no very great genius arose in the Netherlands in any branch of literature. For the thirty or forty years preceding 1880 the course of literature in the Netherlands was smooth and even sluggish. The Dutch writers had slipped into a conventionality of treatment and a strict limitation of form from which even the most striking talents among them could scarcely escape.

Poetry and a large part of prose was dominated by the so-called school of ministers, as the leading writers all were or had been Calvinist ministers. As a result, many of their products emphasized Biblical and bourgeois domestic values. A prime example is Nicolaas Beets (1814–1903), who wrote large quantities of sermons and poetry under his own name but is chiefly remembered today for the humorous prose sketches of Dutch life in Camera Obscura (1839), which he wrote during his student days under the pseudonym of Hildebrand.

A poet of power and promise was lost in the early death of P.A. de Genestet (1829–1861). His narrative poem "De Sint-Nicolaasavond" ("Eve of Sinterklaas") appeared in 1849. Although he left no large contemporary impression, Piet Paaltjens (ps. of François Haverschmidt, 1835–1894) is considered one of the very few readable nineteenth-century poets, representing in Dutch the pure Romantic vein exemplified by Heine.

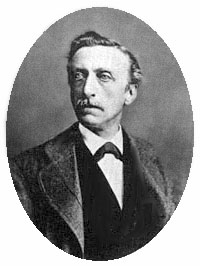
Multatuli (E. Douwes Dekker)

Under the influence of romantic nationalism, writers in Belgium began to reconsider their Flemish heritage and move for a recognition of the Dutch language. Charles De Coster laid the foundations for a native Belgian literature by recounting the Flemish past in historic romances but wrote his works in French. Hendrik Conscience (1812–1883) was the first to write about Flemish subjects in the Dutch language and so is considered the father of modern Flemish literature. In Flemish poetry, Guido Gezelle (1830–1899) is an important figure. An ordained journalist-cum-ethnologist, Gezelle celebrated his faith and his Flemish roots using an archaic vocabulary based on Medieval Flemish, somewhat to the detriment of readability. See also the article on Flemish literature.

After the restoration in 1815 to the Dutch state of the Dutch East Indies, works of literature continued to be produced there. With the rise of social consciousness regarding the administration of the colonies and the treatment of their inhabitants, an influential voice rose from the Indies in the form of Multatuli (ps. of Eduard Douwes Dekker, 1820–1887), whose Max Havelaar (1860) is a scathing indictment of colonial mismanagement and one of the few nineteenth-century prose works still widely considered readable today.

The principles of the 1830–1880 period were summed up in Conrad Busken-Huet (1826–1886), leading critic of the day; he had been during all those years the fearless and trusty watch-dog of Dutch letters as he understood them. He lived just long enough to become aware that a revolution was approaching, not to comprehend its character; but his accomplished fidelity to literary principle and his wide knowledge have been honoured even by the most bitter of the younger school.

In November 1881 Jacques Perk (born 1860) died. He was no sooner dead, however, than his posthumous poems, and in particular a cycle of sonnets called Mathilde, were published (1882) and awakened extraordinary emotion. Perk had rejected all the formulas of rhetorical poetry, and had broken up the conventional rhythms. There had been heard no music like his in the Netherlands for two hundred years. A group of young men collected around his name and were joined by the poet-novelist-dramatist Marcellus Emants (1848–1923). Emants had written a symbolical poem called "Lilith" in 1879 that had been stigmatised as audacious and meaningless; encouraged by the admiration of his juniors, Emants published in 1881 a treatise in which the first open attack was made on the old school.

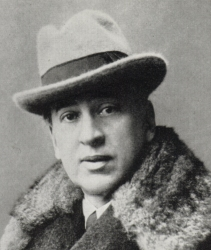
Louis Couperus

The next appearance was that of Willem Kloos (1857–1938), who had been the editor and intimate friend of Perk, and who now led the new movement. His violent attacks on recognized authority in aesthetics created a considerable scandal. For some time the new poets and critics found a great difficulty in being heard, but in 1884 they founded a review, De Nieuwe Gids ("The New Guide"), which was able to offer a direct challenge to the old guard's periodicals. The new movement was called Tachtigers or "Movement of (Eighteen-)Eighty", after the decade in which it arose. The Tachtigers insisted that style must match content, and that intimate and visceral emotions can only be expressed using an intimate and visceral writing style. Prime influences of the Tachtigers were U.K. poets such as Shelley and the French naturalists.

Leading representatives of the Tachtigers are:

- Willem Kloos
- Albert Verwey
- Frederik van Eeden
- Marcellus Emants
- Lodewijk van Deyssel
- Herman Gorter

Around the same time, Louis Couperus (1863–1923) made his appearance. His boyhood years were spent in Java, and he had preserved in all his nature a certain tropical magnificence. His first literary efforts were lyrics in the Tachtigers style, but Couperus proved far more important and durable as a novelist. In 1891 he published Noodlot, which was translated into English as Footsteps of Fate and which was greatly admired by Oscar Wilde. Couperus continued to pour out one important novel after another until his death in 1923. Another talent for prose was revealed by Frederik van Eeden (1860–1932) in De kleine Johannes ("Little Johnny", 1887) and in Van de koele meren des doods ("From the Cold Pools of Death", 1901), a melancholy novel.

After 1887 the condition of modern Dutch literature remained comparatively stationary, and within the last decade of the 19th century was definitely declining. In 1889 a new poet, Herman Gorter (1864–1927) made his appearance with an epic poem called Mei ("May"), eccentric both in prosody and in treatment. He held his own without any marked advance towards lucidity or variety. Since the recognition of Gorter, however, no really remarkable talent made itself prominent in Dutch poetry except P.C. Boutens (1870–1943), whose Verzen ("Verses") in 1898 were received with great respect.

Kloos collected his poems in 1894. The others, with the exception of Couperus, showed symptoms of sinking into silence. The entire school, now that the struggle for recognition was over, rested on its triumphs and soon limited itself to a repetition of its old experiments.

The leading dramatist at the close of the century was Herman Heijermans (1864–1924), a writer of strong realistic and socialistic tendencies who single-handedly brought Dutch theatre into the modern time. His fishermen's tragedy Op Hoop van Zegen ("Trusting Our Fate in the Hands of God"), which is still staged, remains his most popular play.

== 20th century ==
In common with the rest of Europe, the Netherlands of the nineteenth century effectively remained unchanged until World War I (1914–1918). Belgium was invaded by the German Empire; the Netherlands faced severe economic difficulties owing to its policy of neutrality and consequent political isolation, wedged as it was between the two warring sides.

Both the Belgian and Dutch societies emerged from the war pillarised, meaning that each of the main religious and ideological movements (Protestant, Catholic, Socialist and Liberal) stood independent of the rest, each operating its own newspapers, magazines, schools, broadcasting organizations and so on in a form of self-imposed, non-racial segregation. This in turn affected literary movements, as writers gathered around the literary magazines of each of the four "pillars" (limited to three in Belgium, as Protestantism never took root there).

One of the most important historical writers of the 20th century was Johan Huizinga, who is known abroad and translated in different languages and included in several great books lists. His written works were influenced by the literary figures of the early 20th century.

- Hendrik Marsman
- Adriaan Roland Holst
- J. van Oudshoorn
- Arthur van Schendel
- Hendrik de Vries
- Jacobus van Looy

=== New Objectivity and the Forum Group (1925–1940) ===
During the 1920s, a new group of writers who distanced themselves from the ornate style of the Movement of 1880 arose, claiming it to be too self-centered and distanced from real life. Their movement was called "Nieuwe Zakelijkheid", or New Objectivity. An isolated forerunner is the figure of Nescio (J.H.F. Grönloh, 1882–1961), who published his few short stories in the 1910s. A prime example of New Objectivity is F. Bordewijk (1884–1965), whose short story Bint (1931) and terse writing epitomise the style.

An offshoot of the New Objectivity movement centered on the Forum magazine, which appeared in the years 1932–1935 and was edited by the leading Dutch literary critic Menno ter Braak (1902–1940) and the novelist Edgar du Perron (1899–1940). Writers associated at one point or other with this modernist magazine include Belgian writers Willem Elsschot and Marnix Gijsen and Dutch writers J. Slauerhoff, Simon Vestdijk and Jan Greshoff.

=== Second World War and Occupation (1940–1945) ===
The Second World War marked an abrupt change in the Dutch literary landscape. Casualties of the start of the German occupation included Du Perron (heart attack), Ter Braak (suicide) and Marsman (drowned while trying to escape to the United Kingdom); many other writers were forced into hiding or rounded up in Nazi concentration camps, such as Vestdijk. Many writers ceased publishing as a consequence of refusing to join the German-installed Kultuurkamer (Chamber of Culture), which intended to regulate cultural life in the Netherlands. Jewish-born writer Josef Cohen escaped prosecution by converting to Christianity; aspiring writer Anne Frank (whose diary was published posthumously) died in a German concentration camp, as did crime fiction writer, journalist and poet Jan Campert, who was arrested for aiding Jews and died in 1943 in Neuengamme. His poem De achttien dooden ("The eighteen dead"), written from the point of view of a captured resistance member awaiting his execution, has become the most famous example of war-related Dutch literature.

=== Modern times (1945–present) ===
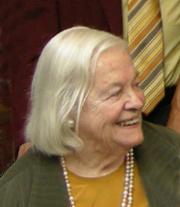
Hella S. Haasse

Writers who had lived through the atrocities of the Second World War reflected in their works on the changed perception of reality. Obviously many looked back on their experiences the way Anne Frank had done in her Diary, this was the case with Het bittere kruid (The bitter herb) of Marga Minco, and Kinderjaren (Childhood) of Jona Oberski. The renewal, which in literary history would be described as "ontluisterend realisme" (shocking realism), is mainly associated with three authors: Gerard Reve, W.F. Hermans and Anna Blaman. Idealism seems to have disappeared from their prose, now marked by the description of raw reality, inhumanity, with great attention to physicality and sexuality. An obvious example is "De Avonden" (The evenings) of Gerard Reve, analysing the disillusionment of an adolescent during the "wederopbouw", the period of rebuilding after the destruction of World War II. In Flanders, Louis Paul Boon and Hugo Claus were the main representatives of this new literary trend.

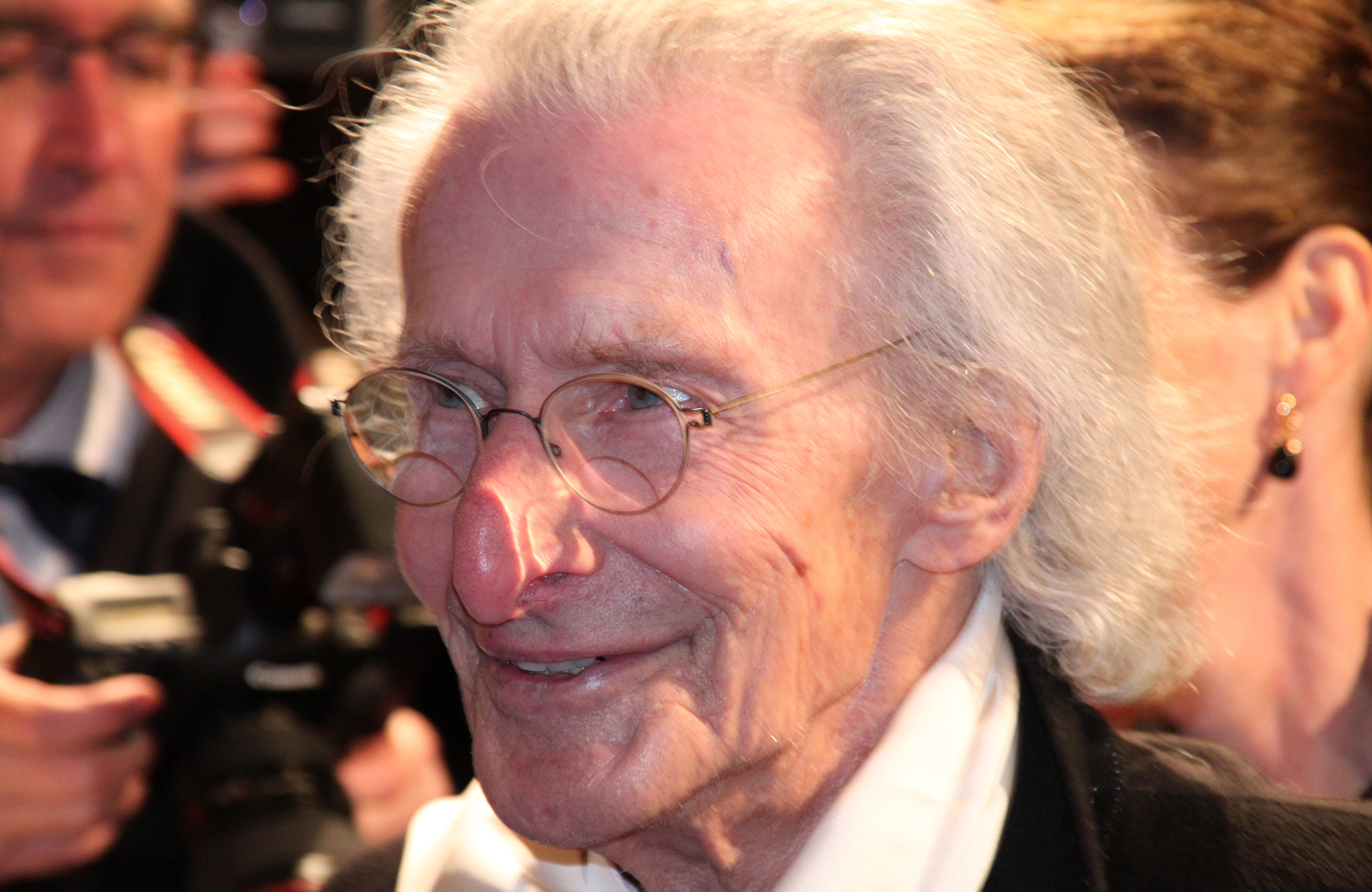
Harry Mulisch in 2010

- Netherlands: Vijftigers, Lucebert, Hans Lodeizen, Jules Deelder, J. Bernlef, Remco Campert, Hella S. Haasse, Eric de Kuyper, M. Vasalis, Leo Vroman, Harry Mulisch, Willem Frederik Hermans, Gerard Reve, Jan Wolkers, Rudy Kousbroek, Gerrit Komrij, Tessa de Loo, Cees Nooteboom, Maarten 't Hart, A.F.Th. van der Heijden, Rutger Kopland, H.H. ter Balkt, Gerrit Krol, Connie Palmen, Geert Mak, J.J. Voskuil, Arnon Grunberg, Joost Zwagerman, Tjalie Robinson, Marion Bloem, Ernst Jansz, Beb Vuyk, Maria Dermout, Adriaan van Dis.
- Flanders: Gerard Walschap, Louis Paul Boon, Hugo Claus, Jef Geeraerts, Tom Lanoye, Erwin Mortier, Dimitri Verhulst, Jotie T'Hooft, Herman Brusselmans, Tom Naegels, Kristien Hemmerechts, Herman de Coninck, Marnix Gijsen, Jos Vandeloo
- Suriname: Wim Bos Verschuur, Hugo Pos, Corly Verlooghen (nl), Ellen Ombre (nl)

== See also ==
- Middle Dutch literature
- Dutch folklore
- Basic Library of Dutch Literature
- Dutch Indies literature
- Belgian literature
  - Literature of Flanders
- Surinamese literature
- Afrikaans literature
- List of Dutch language writers
- List of Dutch poets
- Geographical distribution of Dutch speakers
