= Major general =

Military rank

Major general is a military rank used in many countries. It is derived from the older rank of sergeant major general.

In English-speaking countries, when appointed to a field command, a major general is typically in command of a division consisting of around 6,000 to 25,000 troops (several regiments or brigades). It is a rank that is subordinate to the rank of lieutenant general and senior to the rank of brigadier or brigadier general. In the Commonwealth, major general is equivalent to the navy rank of rear admiral. In air forces with a separate rank structure (Commonwealth), major general is equivalent to air vice-marshal.

In some countries, including much of Eastern Europe, that do not use the brigadier general rank, major general is the lowest of the general officer ranks.

== Countries ==
=== Major general ranks by country ===
==== Brunei ====
In the sultanate of Brunei, the rank of Major general (Malay: Mejar jeneral) is used by the Royal Brunei Land Force and the Royal Brunei Air Force. The rank is held by the Commander of the Royal Brunei Armed Forces.

==== Canada ====
In the Canadian Armed Forces, the rank of major-general (MGen) (French: major-général) is both a Canadian Army and Royal Canadian Air Force rank equivalent to the Royal Canadian Navy's rank of rear-admiral. A major-general is a general officer, the equivalent of a naval flag officer. The major-general rank is senior to the ranks of brigadier general and commodore, and junior to lieutenant-general and vice admiral. Prior to 1968, the Air Force used the rank of air vice-marshal, instead.

The rank insignia for a major-general in the Royal Canadian Air Force is a wide braid under a single narrow braid on the cuff, as well as two silver maple leaves beneath a crossed sword and baton, all surmounted by St. Edward's Crown. In the Canadian Army, the rank insignia is a wide braid on the cuff, as well as two gold maple leaves beneath a crossed sword and baton, all surmounted by St. Edward's Crown. It is worn on the shoulder straps of the service dress tunic, and on slip-ons on other uniforms. On the visor of the service cap are two rows of gold oak leaves.

Major-generals are initially addressed as 'general' and name, as are all general officers; thereafter by subordinates as 'sir' or 'ma'am' as applicable in English (French: mon général). Major-generals are normally entitled to staff cars.

==== Myanmar ====
In Myanmar, a Major General rank is usually held by someone that is a Regional Military Command General Officer Commanding (Regional Commander or တိုင်းမှူး) or a Director such as Director of Defence Service Intelligence (Khin Nyunt for example)

==== New Zealand ====
In the New Zealand Army, major-general is the rank held by the chief of army (formerly the chief of general staff). The more senior rank of lieutenant-general is reserved for when an army officer holds the position of chief of defence force, who commands all of New Zealand's armed forces. This position is subject to rotation between the heads of the New Zealand Air Force, New Zealand Army, and New Zealand Navy.

==== Pakistan ====
Major general in the Pakistan Army is equivalent to rear admiral in the Pakistan Navy and air vice marshal in the Pakistan Air Force. It is the lowest of the general officer ranks, ranking between brigadier and lieutenant general.

==== Portugal ====
The rank of major-general was reintroduced in the Portuguese Army, Portuguese Air Force, and Portuguese National Republican Guard in 1999, replacing the former rank of brigadier in the role of brigade commander. As a rank, it had previously been used in the Army only for a brief period (from 1862 to 1864). It is equivalent to the rank of contra-almirante (rear-admiral) in the Portuguese Navy. In 2015, the rank of major-general was moved up one level, with the role of brigade commander being assumed by the below rank of brigadier-general.

In most of the 19th and first half of the 20th century, major-general was not used as a rank in the Portuguese military, but as an appointment title conferred to the general officer that acted as the military head of a service branch. The roles of Major-General of the Navy (Major-General da Armada) and Major-General of the Army (Major-General do Exército) became extinct in 1950, with their roles being unified in the then created Chief of the General Staff of the Armed Forces.

==== Russia ====
In the Russian Army, the rank 'major general' is known as Russian: генера́л-майо́р, romanized: generál-mayór. It is equivalent to a British brigadier or an American brigadier general.

==== Turkey ====
The Turkish Army and Air Force refer to the rank as tümgeneral. The Turkish Navy equivalent is tümamiral. The name is derived from tümen, the Turkish word for a military division (tümen itself is an older Turkish word meaning 10,000). Thus, linguistically, it is similar to the French equivalent for a major general, French: général de division.

==== United States ====
In the United States, the rank of major general exists in the United States Air Force, United States Army, United States Marine Corps, and United States Space Force.

=== Generalmajor ===
Generalmajor is the Germanic variant of major general, used in a number of Central and Northern European countries, including Austria, Belgium, Denmark, Finland, Germany, Norway, and Sweden.

== Insignia ==
=== Army ===
Gjeneral major
(Albanian Land Force)

Général major
(Arabic: لواء, romanized: Liwa)
(Algerian Land Forces)

գեներալ-մայոր
General-mayor
(Armenian Ground Forces)

Major general
(Australian Army)

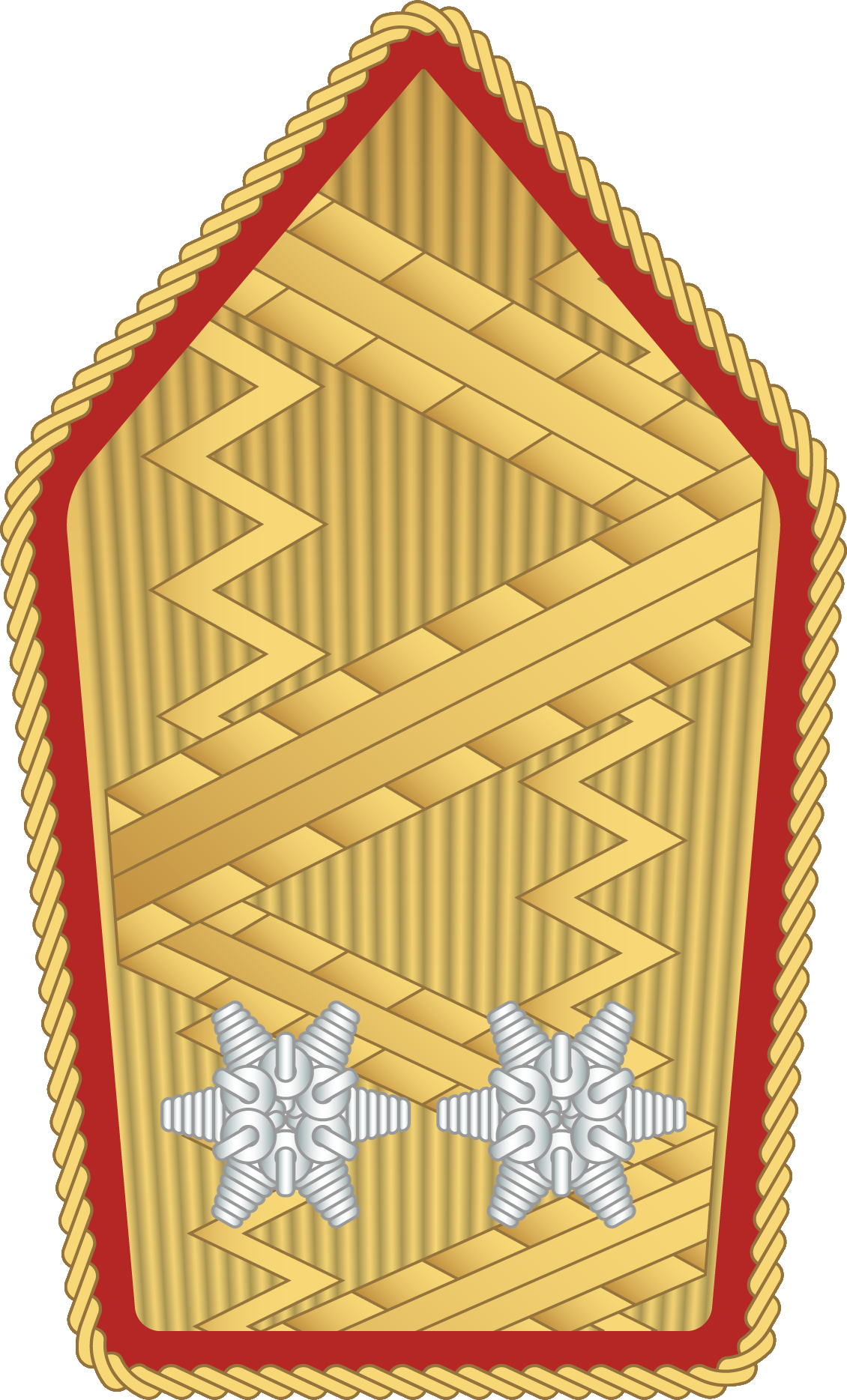
Generalmajor
(Austrian Land Forces)

General-mayor
(Azerbaijani Land Forces)

Major general
(Barbados Regiment)

Major general
(Bengali: মেজর জেনারেল, romanized: Mējara jēnārēla)
(Bangladesh Army)

Ґенэрал-маёр
G̀jeneral-major
(Belarusian Ground Forces)

Generaal-majoor
(Général-major)
(Belgian Land Component)

Major general
(Belize Defence Force)

Major general
(Dzongkha: གུང་ བློན་ འོག མ །)
(Royal Bhutan Army)

General major
(Bosnian Ground Forces)

Major general
(Botswana Ground Force)

Mejar jeneral
(Royal Brunei Land Force)

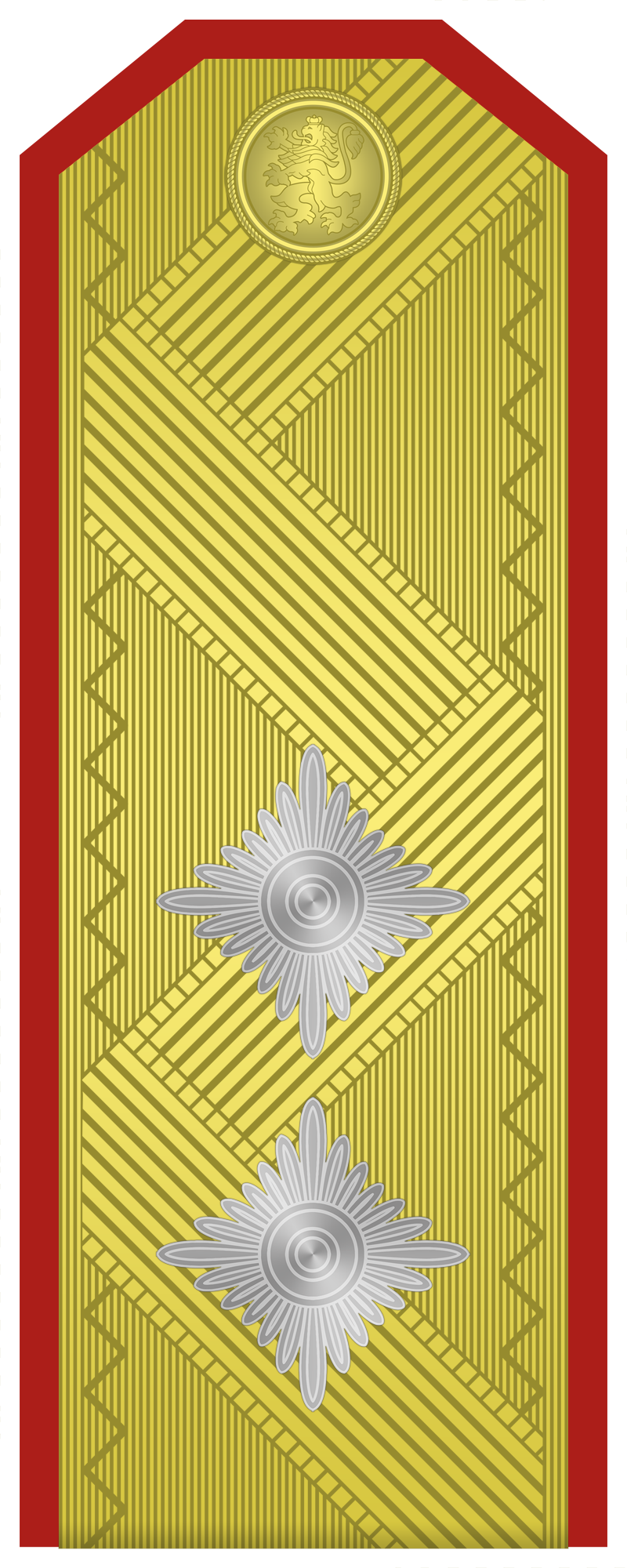
Генерал-майор
General-mayor
(Bulgarian Land Forces)

Général-major
(Kirundi: Jenerai majoro)
(Burundi Army)

Major-general
(French: Major-général)
(Canadian Army)

Major-general
(Cape Verdean National Guard)

Brigadier general
(Colombian National Army)

Général-major
(Land Forces of the DR Congo)

General bojnik
(Croatian Army)

Generálmajor
(Czech Land Forces)

Generalmajor
(Royal Danish Army)

Mayor general
(Dominican Army)

Major general
(Eritrean Army)

Kindralmajor
(Estonian Land Forces)

Major general
(Eswatini Army)

ሜጄር ጄኔራል
Mējēri jēnērali
(Ethiopian Ground Forces)

Major general
(Fiji Infantry Regiment)

Kenraalimajuri
(Swedish: Generalmajor)
(Finnish Army)

Major general
(Gambian National Army)

გენერალ-მაიორი
General-maiori
(Georgian Land Forces)

Generalmajor
(German Army)

Major general
(Ghana Army)

Major-general
(Army of Guinea-Bissau)

Major general
(Guyana Army)

Major general
(Hindi: मेजर - जनरल, romanized: mejar - janaral)
(Indian Army)

Mayor jenderal
(Indonesian Army)

Major-general
(Irish: Maor-ghinearál)
(Irish Army)

Major general
(Jamaican Army)

Генерал-майор
General-mayor
(Kazakh Ground Forces)

Major general
(Kenya Army)

Gjeneral major
(Kosovo Security Force)

Генерал-майор
General-mayor
(Kyrgyz Army)

Ģenerālmajors
(Latvian Land Forces)

Generolas majoras
(Lithuanian Land Forces)

Major general
(Lesotho Army)

Major general
(Liberian Ground Forces)

Major general
(Malawi Army)

Mejar jeneral
(Malaysian Army)

Major general
(Dhivehi: ބްރިގޭޑިއަރ ޖެނެރަލް)
(Maldivian Marine Corps)

Хошууч генерал
Khoshuuch gyenyeral
(Mongolian Ground Force)

General major
(Montenegrin Ground Army)

Major-general
(Mozambican Army)

Major general
(Namibian Army)

Generaal-majoor
(Royal Netherlands Army)

Major-general
(New Zealand Army)

Mayor general
(Nicaraguan Army)

Major general
(Nigerian Army)

Генерал мајор
General major
(North Macedonian Ground Forces)

Generalmajor
(Norwegian Army)

میجر جنرل
Major general
(Pakistan Army)

Major general
(Papua New Guinea Land Element)

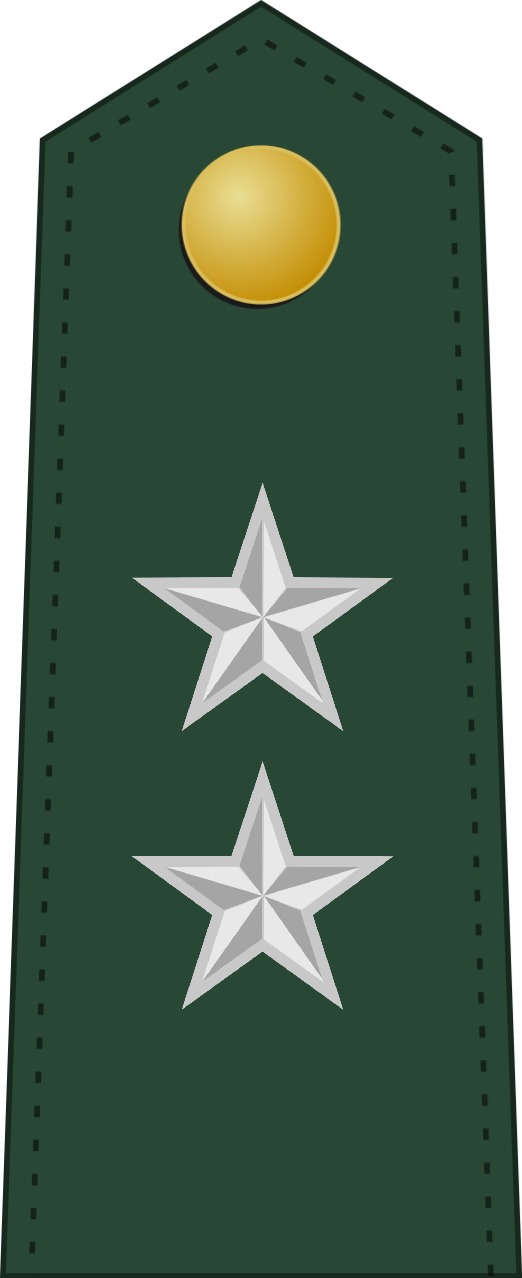
Major general
(Philippine Army)

Major-general
(Portuguese Army)

General-maior
(Romanian Land Forces)

Генера́л-майо́р
Generál-mayór
(Russian Ground Forces)

Major general
(Rwandan Land Forces)

Генерал-Мајор
General-major
(Serbian Army)

Major general
(Sierra Leone Army)

Major general
(Singapore Army)

Generálmajor
(Slovak Ground Forces)

Generalmajor
(Slovenian Ground Force)

Major general
(Somali: Sareeye Gaas)
(Somali National Army)

Major general
(South African Army)

Major general
(Sri Lanka Army)

Generalmajor
(Swedish Army)

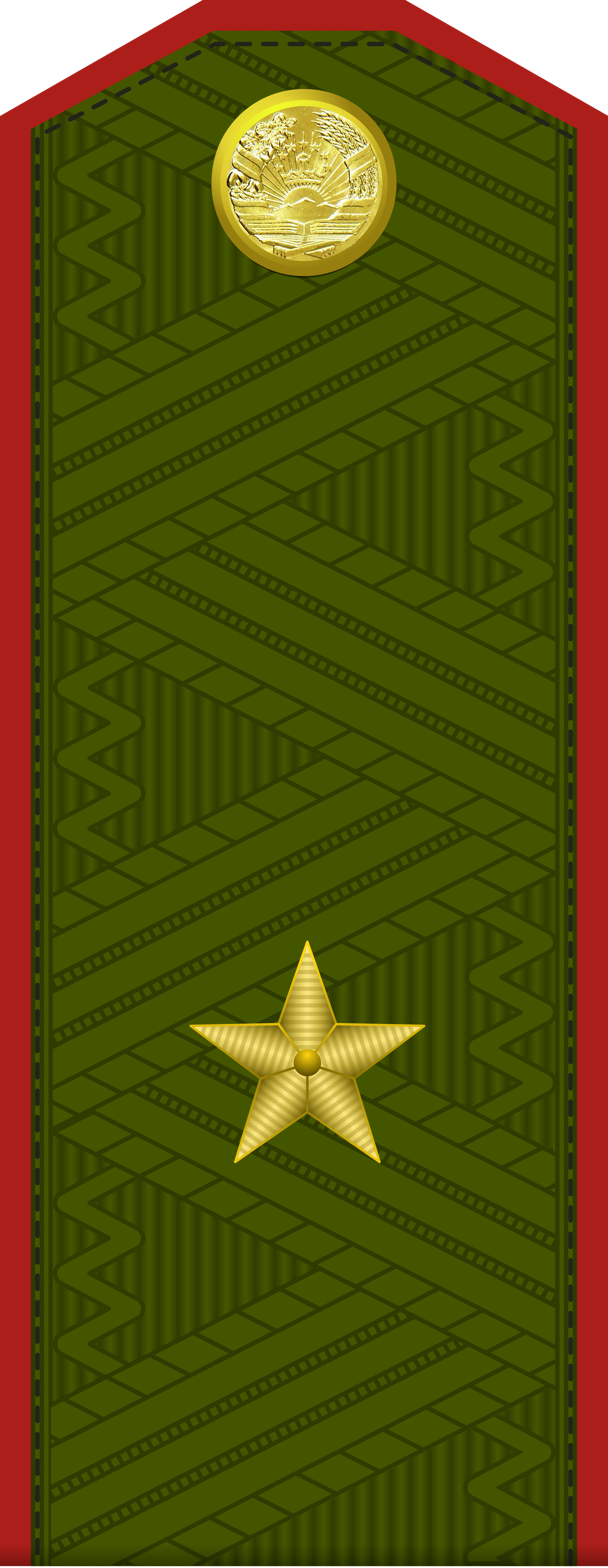
Генерал-майор
General-mayor
(Tajik Ground Forces)

Meja jenerali
(Tanzanian Army)

Major-general
(Timor-Leste Army)

Major general
(Trinidad and Tobago Regiment)

General-maýor
(Turkmen Ground Forces)

Major general
(Ugandan Land Forces)

Генерал-майор
Heneral-maior
(Ukrainian Ground Forces)

Major general
(British Army)

Major general
(United States Army)

Mayor general
(National Army of Uruguay)

General-mayor
(Uzbek Ground Forces)

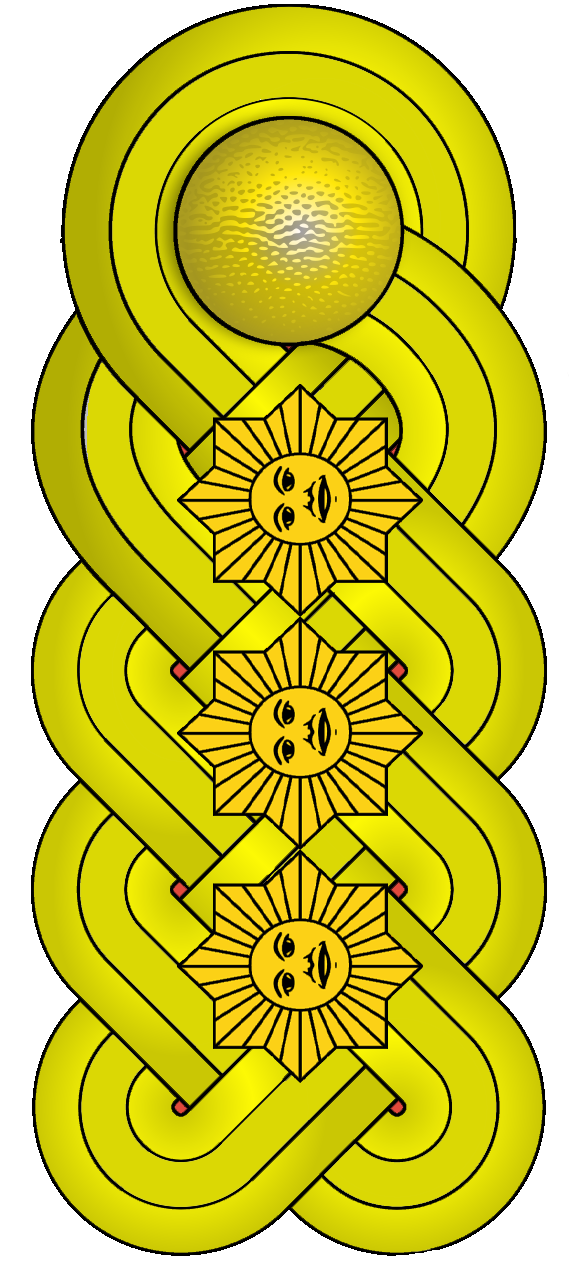
Mayor general
(Venezuelan Army)

Major general
(Zambian Army)

Major general
(Zimbabwe National Army)

== See also ==
- List of comparative military ranks
- Major-General's Song
- Military organization
