= Justus van Effen =

Dutch writer and translator (1684-1735)

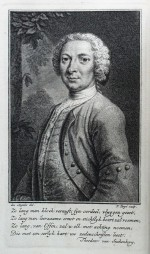
Justus van Effen

Justus van Effen (21 February 1684 – 18 September 1735) was a Dutch writer, who wrote chiefly in French but also made crucial contributions to Dutch literature. A journalist, he imitated The Spectator with the publication of the Dutch-language Hollandsche Spectator. He gained international fame as a writer of French periodicals and a translator from English into French, and he is also recognized as one of the most important Dutch language writers of the 18th century and an influential figure of the Dutch Enlightenment.

== Life and works ==
He was born in Utrecht, the second child of Melchior and Maria van Effen. Justus van Effen planned a scholarly career, and around 1699 he began his studies at the University of Utrecht, but after the early death of his father (on 6 May 1706) he was forced to become a private tutor, taking responsibilities for his mother and sister. He had made acquaintances among French émigrés, in connection with whom he began literary life in 1713 by editing a French journal. From 1715 to 1727 he was a secretary at the Netherlands embassy in London, where he also became a member of the Royal Society, and later, served as a clerk in the Dutch government warehouses (1732).

What gained him fame, however, were his literary and journalistic endeavours. A translator from English to French, he translated Swift's "Tale of a Tub" into Dutch and Defoe's Robinson Crusoe, and is credited with a significant influence in the bringing of English literature to continental Europe.

An enthusiast for English periodicals, and in particular, The Spectator of Joseph Addison and Richard Steele, soon after first issues of The Spectator he launched Le Misanthrope (1711–1712) (a widely read journal referred to as "the first moralist periodical on the continent"), Le Bagatelle (1718–1719), Le nouveau Spectateur François (1725) and then in his native language, the Hollandsche Spectator (1731–1735).

The Hollandsche Spectator was one of the most notable papers inspired by The Spectator. Its topics consisted of everything a coffeehouse audience would be interested in: politics, religion and morality, fashion, and humor. Socially conservative, written in a pleasing tone and style, it raised important issues, questioning the reasons behind the waning position of the Dutch Republic on the international scene, and served as literary and moral guide for the bourgeoisie. The Hollandsche Spectator is considered one of the achievements of the late 18th century Dutch literature, and an inspiration to much Dutch journalism and literature.

Van Effen died in 's-Hertogenbosch, aged 51.
