= Hollandsche Spectator =

Periodical literature

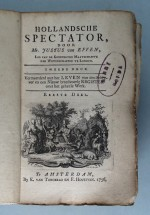
De Hollandsche Spectator

The Hollandsche Spectator (lit. "Dutch Spectator") was an important Dutch language newspaper (or an early magazine) of the Enlightenment period.

It was founded by Justus van Effen, who was inspired by the British Spectator of Joseph Addison and Richard Steele. Justus van Effen was a government official, author and translator, and had previous experience as a publisher of several French-language magazines (Le Misanthrope (1711–1712) - a widely read journal referred to as "the first moralist periodical on the continent", Le Bagatelle (1718–1719), and Le Spectateur Français (1725)).

The Hollandsche Spectator was published in Amsterdam by Uytwerf Hermanus. It first appeared weekly, then twice a week. About 360 editions were published between August 20, 1731, and April 8, 1735. Effen's death in 1735 was soon followed by the closure of the newspaper. However, it has inspired dozens of successors.

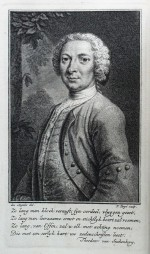
Justus van Effen

It was one of the most notable papers inspired by The Spectator, in which the spectator, literally "observer", is the mask behind which the author hides his views; often the anonymous authors claimed that he is not a person but a group. The topics of the Hollandsche Spectator consisted of everything that would interest a coffeehouse audience: politics, religion and morality, fashion, and humor. Socially conservative, written in a pleasing tone and style, it raised important questions, such as the reasons behind the Dutch Republic's waning position on the international scene, and served as literary and moral guide for the emerging Dutch bourgeoisie. It also opened the market for newspapers and magazines in the Dutch language.

The publishing of the Hollandsche Spectator is considered one of the most valuable achievements of the late 18th-century Dutch literature, and an inspiration to much Dutch journalism and literature.

== See also ==
- Dutch Enlightenment
- De Nederlandsche Spectator (1855–1860)
- The Spektator (1843–1850)
