= List of countries by English-speaking population =

Native English speakers by subdivision (in the Anglophone)

The following is a list of English-speaking populations by country, including information on both native speakers and second-language speakers.

== List ==
| Country | Population | Total English speakers | Total % | As first language | L1 % | As an additional language (Note: Statistics on second language speakers are inevitably not precise; partly because there is no widely agreed definition of second language speakers – there is no differentiation between countries where English is the lingua franca and those where it is not.) | L2 or L3 % | Notes / Sources |
|---|---|---|---|---|---|---|---|---|
| United States | 312,142,415 | 299,270,000 | 95.88% | 244,079,241 | 78.19% | 55,191,937 | 17.68% | Figures are from the 2022 American Community Survey 5-year estimates by the U.S. Census Bureau for persons age 5 and older. Total English speakers are those who either spoke English at home (i.e. as first language) or reported speaking another language at home but could speak English "very well" or "well" (i.e. as an additional language). |
| India | 1,400,000,000 | 269,800,000 | 19% | 1,259,678 | 0.02% | 268,540,322 | 18.98% | 2021 estimate. 2011 figure for first language. |
| Pakistan | 220,892,331 | 156,766,249 | 60.91% | 8,642 | 0.0035% | 156,766,349 | 60.91% | English is one of the official languages under the constitution and is commonly used in education and administration. According to statistics from various sources, the English-speaking population ranges from 88.69 million to 156 million, accounting for 58 to 61% of the total population. when combining L1 L2 and L3 speakers English is the most spoken language in Pakistan. |
| Nigeria | 206,200,000 | 125,039,688 | 60.64% | 20,000,000 | 9.70% | 103,198,040 | 50.05% | English is the most widespread language in the country due to the many different languages spoken, with 60 million speakers. This includes speakers of an English creole, accounting for 51% to 57% of the total population. It is estimated that 10% of Nigerians speak English as a first language. |
| Indonesia | 279,118,866 | 85,968,611 | 30.80% | 837,356 | 0.30% | 85,131,255 | 30.50% | Indonesians learn English as a major foreign language. |
| Philippines | 118,060,000 | 70,117,935 | 63.74% | 36,935 | 0.04% | 70,081,000 | 63.71% | Over 60 million people aged 5 years or more can speak English. "Six out of 10 people aged 5 and over can speak English (63.71%)." |
| United Kingdom | 64,835,742 | 63,718,834 | 98.28% | 59,323,568 | 91.50% | 4,395,266 | 6.78% | Data is from the 2021 census. Additional English speaker figures are for usual residents aged 3 years and over with a main language other than English who can speak English "very well" or "well" (or, in the case of Scotland, those who have reported speaking ability in English). |
| Germany | 82,347,000 | 45,900,000 | 55.74% | 774,000 | 0.94% | 45,100,000 | 54.77% | Native speakers: Mikrozensus 2021, Statistisches Bundesamt. Non-native speakers: Eurobarometer report 2012. Does not include foreign military personnel based in Germany. |
| Kenya | 52,533,109 | 41,332,711 | 78.68% | – | – | 7,900,000 | 15.04% | Crystal (2003), p. 109. |
| Egypt | 110,990,000 | 38,846,500 | 35.0% | – | – | – | – | Speakers to at least an intermediate level, Euromonitor International Report 2012 |
| Japan | 126,146,099 | 35,320,907 | 28.00% | ? | ? | ? | ? | |
| South Africa | 61,090,000 | 31,000,000 | 50.70% | 5,228,301 | 8.73% | 25,771,699 | 38.96% | Native speakers from 2022 Census. Non-native speakers: Crystal (2003), p. 109. |
| Canada | 37,138,500 | 30,480,750 | 82.07% | 20,193,335 | 54.37% | 10,287,415 | 27.70% | The 2016 count reported that 23,757,525 people were able to conduct a conversation in English only, while 6,216,065 were able to converse in both English and French. The census also asked for the first language learned at home in childhood and still understood by the individual: 52% or 19,460,850 reported English as their only mother tongue, 165,320 reported both English and French as mother tongues, 533,265 reported English and a non-official language as mother tongues, and 33,900 reported English, French and a non-official language as mother tongues. The data also show that 26,007,500 Canadians report English as their first official language spoken. |
| Australia | 25,422,788 | 23,161,344 | 91.10% | 18,303,662 | 72.00% | 4,857,672 | 19.10% | The 2021 census data is subject to multiple interpretations. The data noted that 18,303,662 persons out of 23,401,892 total only spoke English, and a further 4,857,672 spoke English either "Very Well" or "Well". A further 872,213 persons were listed as speaking English "Not Well" or "Not At All". However, 1,389,243 persons provided incomplete information; 1,331,417 provided no language or proficiency details and 57,828 gave no information on proficiency. |
| Uganda | 44,270,000 | 19,800,000 | 44.73% | – | – | 19,800,000 | 44.73% | Uganda Bureau of Statistics (2016) |
| Spain | 49,700,000 | 19,400,000 | 39.00% | – | – | 19,400,000 | 39.00% | Eurobarometer-type data reports that about 39% of respondents in Spain say they are able to hold a conversation in English |
| Poland | 38,036,118 | 19,000,000 | 49.95% | 737,276 | 1.94% | 18,000,000 | 47.32% | AutoLingual (blog). Number of first language speakers comes from Statistics Poland. However, of the 737,276 people who spoke English "at home", 714,002 also spoke another language "at home", including 707,487 people who also spoke Polish "at home". |
| Ghana | 26,210,872 | 17,610,870 | 67.19% | – | – | 17,610,870 | 67.19% | 2021 Ghanaian Census, on population aged 6 or above who were "literate" in English. |
| Thailand | 63,038,247 | 17,121,187 | 27.16% | – | – | 17,121,187 | 27.16% | Crystal (2003), p. 109. |
| Ukraine | 33,365,000 | 17,016,000 | 51.00% | – | – | 17,016,000 | 51.00% | Sociological study by KIIS |
| Italy | 59,619,290 | 16,812,640 | 28.2% | 536,574 | 0.9% | 16,276,066 | 27.3% | Languageknowledge.eu |
| France | 67,500,000 | 16,000,000 | 24.6% | – | – | 16,000,000 | 57.25% | According to recent European Commission data compiled by Language Knowledge, approximately 24.6% of the population in France reported speaking English in 2024 |
| Mexico | 120,664,000 | 15,686,262 | 13.00% | – | – | 15,686,262 | 13.00% | Consulta Mitofsky-Tracking Poll Roy Campos: Las Lenguas Extranjeras en México, January 2013; and II Conteo de Población y Vivienda, Instituto Nacional de Estadística, Geografía e Informática (INEGI) |
| Malaysia | 27,170,000 | 15,580,000 | 57.34% | 380,000 | 1.40% | 15,200,000 | 55.94% | EF English Proficiency Index |
| Netherlands | 16,770,000 | 15,250,000 | 90.94% | – | – | 15,250,000 | 90.94% | Eurobarometer report 2016 |
| Turkey | 80,200,256 | 12,000,000 | 14.96% | – | – | 12,000,000 | 14.96% | Eurobarometer report 2006 |
| Brazil | 216,000,000 | 12,000,000 | 5.56% | 292,000 | 0.14% | 10,250,000 | 4.75% | British council (2012) and EF. About 5% of Brazilians have a proficient grasp of English as a second or foreign additional language and an additional 6% have a very rudimentary knowledge. |
| Zimbabwe | 14,439,000 | 11,850,710 | 82.07% | 505,365 | 3.50% | 11,530,710 | 79.86% | |
| Iraq | 46,118,793 | 16,141,578 | 35.00% | 138,356 | 0.30% | 16,003,222 | 34.70% | Eligible population is from the final results of the 2024 General Population and Housing Census announced in February 2025. Because the census did not collect data on native or foreign languages, the total and additional speaker counts are modeled using the proportions from the 2011 Euromonitor International report. |
| Bangladesh | 165,158,616 | 10,784,488 | 6.53% | 709,873 | 0.43% | 10,074,615 | 6.10% | Population data are from 2022 Bangladeshi census, and second language data come from the subsequent survey |
| China | 1,432,035,200 | 10,000,000 | 0.70% | – | – | 10,000,000 | <0.70% | Figures are for English users in mainland China only (i.e. excluding Hong Kong where English is an official language and Macau). The often-cited figure of 300 million is for "learners". |
| Sweden | 10,377,771 | 9,236,000 | 89.00% | – | – | 9,236,000 | 89.00% | Statistics Sweden, 2021 |
| Tanzania | 35,341,131 | 7,660,000 | 21.67% | 240,000 | 0.67% | 7,420,000 | 21.00% | 2022 Population and Housing Census on literacy rate amongst people aged 15 or above. Figure for native speakers referred to those who were "literate in English only" while number for non-native speakers referred to those who were literate in "both Kiswahili and English". |
| Cameroon | 19,740,000 | 7,500,000 | 37.99% | – | – | 7,500,000 | 37.99% | Euromonitor International Report (2009) |
| Morocco | 37,340,000 | 6,883,220 | 18.43% | – | – | 6,883,220 | 18.43% | |
| Belgium | 10,584,534 | 6,250,000 | 59.05% | – | – | 6,250,000 | 59.05% | Eurobarometer report 2006 The Belgian population is divided in two distinct linguistic regions: The Belgian Dutch-speaking Flanders, and the Belgian French-speaking Wallonia (the region of Brussels also has a majority of native French speakers). Like in the Netherlands, a high percentage of Flemish people speak English fluently, and in Wallonia, a lower percentage of people speak English (as it is the case in France), which brings down the total percentage. |
| Israel | 9,601,000 | 3,100,000 | 31.6% | 100,000 | 1.4% | 3,200,000 | 33% | Data collected in Israel between 2018 and 2020 by the National Center for Exams and Evaluation showed that only 33% of Israeli students are able to hold a basic conversation in English; such data only refers to academic students who had declared to have studied English, which indicates that English knowledge among the general population is at a much lower level. |
| Austria | 8,415,000 | 6,150,000 | 73.08% | – | – | 6,150,000 | 73.08% | |
| Romania | 19,043,767 | 5,900,000 | 30.98% | – | – | 5,900,000 | 30.98% | Eurobarometer report 2012 |
| Greece | 10,787,690 | 5,500,000 | 50.98% | – | – | 5,500,000 | 50.98% | Eurobarometer report 2012 |
| Czech Republic | 10,562,214 | 5,350,000 | 50.65% | 16,481 | 0.16% | 5,350,000 | 50.65% | |
| Russia | 135,125,671 | 5,066,515 | 3.75% | – | – | 5,066,515 | 3.75% | Russian population Census, 2021, total count excluded 12,056,452 people who did not specify a language. |
| Ireland | 5,084,879 | 4,958,527 | 97.52% | 4,333,372 | 85.22% | 625,155 | 12.29% | Central Statistics Office 2022 Census Figures for native speakers are people whose spoke English or Irish at home (which likely included the approximately 70,000 people who spoke Irish daily outside education system), and additional speakers are people who spoke other languages and declared that they spoke English "very well" or "well". |
| Sierra Leone | 5,866,000 | 4,900,000 | 83.53% | 500,000 | 8.52% | 4,400,000 | 75.01% | Crystal (2003), p. 109. This includes speakers of an English creole. |
| New Zealand | 4,889,202 | 4,750,056 | 97.15% | 3,692,670 | 75.53% | 1,057,386 | 21.62% | There were 4,993,923 responses to 2023 Census: Language spoken. 4,750,056 gave English as a response . Another 104,721 reported no language (e.g. too young). Hence it is most meaningful to express the English-speaking per cent without including the figures for these 104,721. This gives 97.2% English-speaking (3,673,679 divided by 3,755,565), 2.8% non-English-speaking. Figures for native speakers are those who declared English to be the only language they spoke, so they are very likely to be undercounts. |
| Denmark | 5,543,000 | 4,770,000 | 86.05% | – | – | 4,770,000 | 86.05% | Eurobarometer report 2012 |
| Norway | 5,136,700 | 4,500,000 | 87.60% | – | – | 4,500,000 | 87.60% | |
| Papua New Guinea | 6,331,000 | 4,459,191 | 70.43% | – | – | 4,459,191 | 70.43% | 2011 Census. This statistic is people who are literate in Standard English, not including Tok Pisin. |
| Hong Kong | 7,179,127 | 4,217,535 | 58.75% | 330,782 | 4.61% | 3,886,753 | 54.14% | According to 2021 population census, Hong Kong has approximately 4.2 million speakers, of whom 330,782 regard English as their "usual" language. |
| Madagascar | 23,042,300 | 4,147,614 | 18.00% | – | – | 4,147,614 | 18.00% | The main languages are French and Malagasy. |
| Sri Lanka | 21,803,000 | 3,994,174 | 18.32% | 10,000 | 0.05% | 3,994,174 | 18.32% | Crystal (2003), p. 109; Department of Census and Statistics, 2012. 23.8% of the population aged over 10 could speak English. |
| Finland | 5,563,970 | 3,900,000 | 70.09% | 29,448 | 0.53% | 3,870,000 | 69.55% | Native speakers: Statistics Finland; Total speakers: Eurobarometer report 2022 |
| Cambodia | 15,766,292 | 3,500,000 | 22.20% | – | – | 3,500,000 | 22.20% | Quote of a Ministry of Education spokesman |
| Switzerland | 8,482,268 | 3,279,538 | 38.66% | 492,343 | 5.80% | 2,787,195 | 32.86% | Figure for speakers of English as "main language", according to Federal Statistical Office 2020. Source for number of total English speakers is an FSO survey in 2019 on "the main languages in regular use", which reported that 48.8% of permanent residents aged 15 or above (7,187,688 as of 2020) regularly used English; as a result, total speakers and non-native speakers are likely to be undercounts due to the exclusion of children below the age of 15. |
| Liberia | 3,750,000 | 3,100,000 | 82.67% | 600,000 | 16.00% | 2,500,000 | 66.67% | Crystal (2003), p. 109. This includes speakers of an English creole. |
| Jordan | 6,598,000 | 2,969,370 | 45.00% | – | – | 2,969,370 | 45.00% | Euromonitor International report (2011) |
| Portugal | 10,623,000 | 2,900,000 | 27.30% | – | – | 2,900,000 | 27.30% | Eurobarometer report 2012 |
| Argentina | 42,192,500 | 2,752,681 | 6.52% | – | – | 2,752,681 | 6.52% | Percentage of people who state they have a high level of English. Another 19.49% and 16.23% of people said they had an intermediate and low level, respectively, of English. |
| Singapore | 3,596,284 | 2,668,719 | 74.21% | 1,735,242 | 58.10% | 933,477 | 25.96% | Figures taken from 2020 indicate Singaporean residents (citizen and permanent resident population); data for population who spoke English as an additional language came from summing number of people whose second most spoken language at home was English. 2025 census indicates 58.1% of Singaporean residents speak English as their first language. |
| Jamaica | 2,714,000 | 2,650,000 | 97.64% | 45,900 | 1.69% | 2,604,100 | 95.95% | Crystal (2003), p. 109. This includes speakers of an English creole. |
| Algeria | 35,954,000 | 2,516,780 | 7.00% | – | – | 2,516,780 | 7.00% | |
| Peru | 31,151,643 | 2,492,131 | 8.00% | – | – | 2,492,131 | 8.00% | GfK survey in 2015 |
| Afghanistan | 41,130,000 | 2,467,800 | 6.00% | – | – | 2,467,800 | 6.00% | During the two decades since the U.S. military intervened in Afghanistan, English as a foreign language was learned by 6% of Afghans. (see Languages of Afghanistan) |
| Hungary | 9,603,634 | 2,428,295 | 25.29% | – | – | 2,428,295 | 25.29% | 2022 Census |
| Myanmar | 53,900,000 | 2,400,000 | 4.45% | – | – | 2,400,000 | 4.45% | Crystal (2003), p. 109. |
| Yemen | 24,800,000 | 2,232,000 | 9.00% | – | – | 2,232,000 | 9.00% | Euromonitor International report 2011 |
| Colombia | 47,661,368 | 2,012,950 | 4.22% | 75,600 | 0.16% | 1,937,350 | 4.06% | Total was estimated by multiplying projected population for 2014 (DANE) by percentage of Colombian population who speak English, 4.09%, then 63,600 was added to that figure which is the total of American and British residents. Figures for native speakers are as follows: 60,000 U.S. citizens who reside in Colombia. 12,000 are Colombian Raizal from San Andrés and Isla de Providencia where they speak San Andrés–Providencia Creole. 3,600 British expatriates. |
| Zambia | 11,922,000 | 1,910,000 | 16.02% | 110,000 | 0.92% | 1,800,000 | 15.10% | Crystal (2003), p. 109. |
| Bulgaria | 7,640,238 | 1,902,605 | 24.90% | 2,605 | 0.03% | 1,900,000 | 24.87% | Eurobarometer report 2012 and 2011 Census |
| Kazakhstan | 12,156,705 | 1,874,583 | 15.42% | 602 | 0.01% | 1,873,981 | 15.42% | Number of those who understand spoken English, from these 1.9 million: 311,435 (2.6%/16.6%) can only read, 931,444 (7.7%/49.6%) can read and write in English. The number of native speakers is the sum of Americans and Englishmen "by nationality". (Census 2009) |
| Rwanda | 8,289,582 | 1,760,444 | 21.24% | – | – | 1,760,444 | 21.24% | Figures reflect the resident population aged 15 and above who are literate in English (National Institute of Statistics of Rwanda 2022 Census) |
| Lebanon | 4,265,600 | 1,706,000 | 39.99% | – | – | 1,706,000 | 39.99% | Euromonitor International report (2011) |
| Chile | 16,634,603 | 1,585,027 | 9.53% | – | – | 1,585,027 | 9.53% | 2012 Census. |
| Croatia | 3,781,833 | 1,500,000 | 39.66% | 2,863 | 0.08% | 1,500,000 | 39.66% | 2021 Croatian census; Eurobarometer report 2024 |
| Slovakia | 5,449,270 | 1,400,000 | 25.69% | 4,365 | 0.08% | 1,400,000 | 25.69% | (For native speakers) 2021 census (total count includes 312,364 people whose first language was unknown, which is excluded when calculating the percentage), Eurobarometer report 2012 |
| Puerto Rico | 3,159,608 | 1,247,939 | 39.50% | 159,024 | 5.03% | 1,088,915 | 34.46% | 2022 American Community Survey Figures for non-native speakers were those who spoke another language and spoke English "very well" and "well". |
| Slovenia | 2,050,000 | 1,210,000 | 59.02% | – | – | 1,210,000 | 59.02% | Eurobarometer report 2012 |
| Trinidad and Tobago | 1,305,000 | 1,145,000 | 87.74% | – | – | 1,145,000 | 87.74% | Crystal (2003), p. 109. This includes speakers of an English creole. |
| Tunisia | 10,527,600 | 1,052,760 | 10.00% | – | – | 1,052,760 | 10.00% | 2011 Euromonitor report |
| Latvia | 2,070,371 | 950,000 | 45.89% | – | – | 950,000 | 45.89% | Eurobarometer report 2012 |
| Lithuania | 2,810,761 | 873,941 | 31.09% | – | – | 873,941 | 31.09% | 2021 census. Number of native speakers was not explicitly stated but included in "other". |
| Uruguay | 3,500,000 | 840,000 | 24.00% | – | – | 840,000 | 24.00% | 2019 National Statistics Institute poll. |
| Guatemala | 14,901,286 | 745,000 | 5.00% | – | – | 745,000 | 5.00% | Figure given by Prensa Libre (2011) |
| Guyana | 751,000 | 680,000 | 90.55% | – | – | 680,000 | 90.55% | Crystal (2003), p. 109. This includes speakers of an English creole. |
| Cyprus | 923,381 | 670,000 | 72.56% | 44,482 | 4.82% | 630,000 | 68.23% | (Native speakers), (Total speakers) Eurobarometer report 2024 |
| Estonia | 1,331,824 | 626,439 | 47.03% | 3,879 | 0.29% | 622,560 | 46.74% | 2021 Census. |
| Botswana | 1,639,833 | 630,000 | 38.42% | – | – | 630,000 | 38.42% | Crystal (2003), p. 109. |
| Panama | 4,176,869 | 584,762 | 14.00% | – | – | 584,762 | 14.00% | |
| Eswatini | 1,141,000 | 550,000 | 48.20% | – | – | 550,000 | 48.20% | Crystal (2003), p. 109. Official language, business conducted in English; primary school language. |
| Malawi | 13,931,831 | 540,209 | 3.88% | 209 | 0.01% | 540,000 | 3.87% | Crystal (2003), p. 109 and Kayambizinthu. |
| Lesotho | 1,795,000 | 500,000 | 27.86% | – | – | 500,000 | 27.86% | Crystal (2003), p. 109. |
| Solomon Islands | 631,061 | 459,906 | 72.88% | – | – | – | – | 2019 Census. Labelled "English Ability", defined as people who can write a simple sentence in English. |
| Malta | 497,265 | 440,000 | 88.48% | 50,242 | 10.10% | 390,000 | 78.43% | (For native speakers) Census of Population and Housing 2021, Eurobarometer report 2012 |
| El Salvador | 6,029,976 | 414,887 | 6.88% | – | – | 414,887 | 6.88% | 2024 Census. |
| Suriname | 470,784 | 410,000 | 87.09% | – | – | – | – | Crystal (2003), p. 109. This includes speakers of an English creole. |
| Costa Rica | 4,910,526 | 400,415 | 8.15% | – | – | 400,415 | 8.15% | Encuesta Nacional de Hogares 2017 |
| Iceland | 376,248 | 368,723 | 98.00% | – | – | – | – | |
| Namibia | 1,820,916 | 314,000 | 17.24% | 14,000 | 0.77% | 300,000 | 16.48% | Crystal (2003), p. 109. |
| Barbados | 296,000 | 296,000 | 100.00% | 10,000 | 3.38% | 286,000 | 96.62% | This includes speakers of an English creole. |
| Bahamas | 330,549 | 288,000 | 87.13% | – | – | – | – | Crystal (2003), p. 109. This includes speakers of an English creole. |
| Belize | 368,924 | 278,390 | 75.46% | – | – | 278,390 | 75.46% | 2022 Census Included population aged 4 or above who spoke English, no distinctions between first and second languages were made. |
| Ecuador | 14,483,499 | 225,000 | 1.55% | – | – | – | – | There are an estimated 225,000 English speakers in Ecuador. The majority resides in Quito. |
| Turkmenistan | 7,057,841 | 204,189 | 2.89% | – | – | 204,189 | 2.89% | 2022 Population and Housing Census |
| Mauritius | 1,233,097 | 202,000 | 16.38% | 15,759 | 1.28% | 200,000 | 16.22% | 2022 HPC |
| Fiji | 926,276 | ? | ? | 27,788 | 3.00% | ? | ? | According to the Freiburg Institute of Advanced Studies, "[while] nearly all Fiji Islanders speak English as a second language, [only] 1% to 3% of the population speak it as their first language". |
| Macao | 663,782 | 150,359 | 22.65% | 23,635 | 3.56% | 126,724 | 19.09% | 2021 Census |
| Brunei | 381,371 | 144,000 | 37.76% | 10,000 | 2.62% | 134,000 | 35.14% | Crystal (2003), p. 109. |
| Armenia | 2,921,062 | 143,939 | 4.93% | – | – | 143,939 | 4.93% | 2022 census, total count excludes 11,669 people who didn't answer question about language proficiency. All speakers were explicitly listed as second language speakers. |
| Vanuatu | 239,839 | 137,827 | 57.47% | 4,955 | 2.07% | 130,000 | 54.20% | 2020 Vanuatu Census. Data for total speakers were people aged 15+ who were literate in English, so the corresponding percentage was calculated through dividing the number by population aged 15+ (179,302). On the other hand, number of native speakers included anyone aged 3+, so the corresponding percentage is calculated by dividing it by total population aged 3 or above (239,839). It is impossible to precisely calculate number of non-native speakers as a result. Figures exclude Bislama. |
| Azerbaijan | 9,594,300 | 123,664 | 1.29% | – | – | 123,664 | 1.29% | 2019 Census, excluded territories controlled by Republic of Artsakh at that time. Figures included only "the fluent speakers". They were all explicitly listed as second language speakers. |
| Luxembourg | 477,061 | 122,467 | 25.67% | 20,316 | 4.26% | 100,000 | 20.96% | RP2021. Figures for total speakers were those who spoke English at home / school / work, so it excludes the people who knew English but didn't actively use it. Percentage of native speakers was calculated from a denominator of total valid responses on that question (563,092). Number of non-native speakers, therefore, cannot be precisely calculated. |
| Saint Vincent and the Grenadines | 120,000 | 114,000 | 95.00% | – | – | – | – | Crystal (2003), p. 109. This includes speakers of an English creole. |
| Guam | 135,770 | 109,218 | 80.44% | 57,906 | 42.65% | 51,312 | 37.79% | 2020 U.S. Census Figures for non-native speakers only included those who spoke another language and spoke English "very well". |
| Nepal | 29,164,578 | 103,884 | 0.35% | 1,323 | 0.0005% | 102,561 | 0.35% | Census 2021 Figures only include those who declared English as their first/second language and does not reflect overall English ability. |
| Grenada | 110,000 | 100,000 | 90.91% | – | – | – | – | Crystal (2003), p. 109. This includes speakers of an English creole. |
| Samoa | 188,540 | 94,000 | 49.86% | 1,000 | 0.53% | 93,000 | 49.33% | Crystal (2003), p. 109. |
| U.S. Virgin Islands | 80,430 | 73,219 | 91.03% | 56,173 | 69.84% | 17,046 | 21.19% | Crystal (2003), p. 109. This includes speakers of an English creole. |
| Isle of Man | 84,069 | 80,781 | 96.09% | 80,781 | 96.09% | – | – | 2021 Census Figure for total English Speakers was likely to be an undercount due to the number of second language speakers not being available. |
| Saint Lucia | 165,000 | 71,000 | 43.03% | 31,000 | 18.79% | 40,000 | 24.24% | Crystal (2003), p. 109. This includes speakers of an English creole. |
| Antigua and Barbuda | 85,000 | 68,000 | 80.00% | – | – | – | – | Crystal (2003), p. 109. This includes speakers of an English creole. |
| Micronesia | 111,000 | 64,000 | 57.66% | 4,000 | 3.60% | 60,000 | 54.05% | Crystal (2003), p. 109. |
| Bermuda | 65,000 | 63,000 | 96.92% | 63,000 | 96.92% | – | – | Crystal (2003), p. 109. |
| Dominica | 67,000 | 63,000 | 94.03% | 3,000 | 4.48% | 60,000 | 89.55% | Crystal (2003), p. 109. This includes speakers of an English creole. |
| Cayman Islands | 68,811 | 61,070 | 88.75% | 61,070 | 88.75% | – | – | 2021 Census |
| Kiribati | 94,312 | 68,765 | 72.91% | – | – | 68,765 | 72.91% | 2010 Census |
| Marshall Islands | 59,000 | 58,000 | 98.31% | 10,000 | 16.95% | 48,000 | 81.36% | Crystal (2003), p. 109. |
| Saint Kitts and Nevis | 50,000 | 39,000 | 78.00% | – | – | – | – | Crystal (2003), p. 109. This includes speakers of an English creole. |
| American Samoa | 44,174 | 20,855 | 47.21% | 1,444 | 3.27% | 19,411 | 43.94% | 2020 U.S. Census Figures for non-native speakers only included those who spoke another language and spoke English "very well". |
| Northern Mariana Islands | 44,111 | 28,599 | 64.83% | 11,466 | 25.99% | 17,133 | 38.84% | 2020 U.S. Census Figures for non-native speakers only included those who spoke another language and spoke English "very well". |
| Aruba | 104,000 | 44,000 | 42.31% | 9,000 | 8.65% | 35,000 | 33.65% | Crystal (2003), p. 109. |
| Gambia | 1,709,000 | 40,000 | 2.34% | 40,000 | 2.34% | – | – | Crystal (2003), p. 109. This includes speakers of an English creole. |
| Seychelles | 87,000 | 33,000 | 37.93% | 3,000 | 3.45% | 30,000 | 34.48% | Crystal (2003), p. 109. |
| Tonga | 100,000 | 30,000 | 30.00% | – | – | 30,000 | 30.00% | Crystal (2003), p. 109. |
| Gibraltar | 26,786 | 24,965 | 93.20% | 20,689 | 77.24% | 4,276 | 15.96% | 2012 Census, native speakers correspond to those who speak English "very well" and non-native speakers correspond to those who speak English "well". |
| British Virgin Islands | 23,000 | 20,000 | 86.96% | 20,000 | 86.96% | – | – | Crystal (2003), p. 109. This includes speakers of an English creole. |
| Palau | 20,000 | 18,500 | 92.50% | 500 | 2.50% | 18,000 | 90.00% | Crystal (2003), p. 109. |
| Andorra | 86,610 | 17,869 | 20.63% | 2,600 | 3.00% | 15,000 | 17.32% | Source Census: (Total speakers) Linguistic knowledge 2004, (Native speakers) Linguistic knowledge 2022 |
| Bonaire | 21,700 | 16,687 | 76.90% | 1,215 | 5.60% | 15,472 | 71.30% | 2021 Dutch census (conducted by Statistics Netherlands). |
| Anguilla | 13,000 | 12,000 | 92.31% | – | – | – | – | Crystal (2003), p. 109. |
| Nauru | 12,000 | 11,600 | 96.67% | 900 | 7.50% | 10,700 | 89.17% | English is spoken as the language of government and commerce. |
| Cook Islands | 20,200 | 4,000 | 19.80% | 1,000 | 4.95% | 3,000 | 14.85% | Crystal (2003), p. 109. |
| Montserrat | 5,900 | 4,000 | 67.80% | 4,000 | 67.80% | – | – | Crystal (2003), p. 109. This includes speakers of an English creole. |
| Liechtenstein | 39,055 | 5,900 | 15.11% | 199 | 0.51% | – | – | |
| Sint Eustatius | 3,100 | 2,902 | 93.60% | 2,517 | 81.20% | 385 | 12.40% | 2021 Dutch census (conducted by Statistics Netherlands). |
| Norfolk Island | 2,188 | 1,911 | 87.34% | 1,146 | 52.38% | 765 | 34.96% | 2021 Australian census (conducted by the Australian Bureau of Statistics). Native English-speaking total does not include native Norfuk speakers, though all Norfuk speakers also speak English . |
| Saba | 1,900 | 1,854 | 97.60% | 1,583 | 83.30% | 271 | 14.30% | 2021 Dutch census (conducted by Statistics Netherlands). |
| Christmas Island | 1,692 | 1,034 | 61.11% | 495 | 29.26% | 539 | 31.86% | 2021 Australian census (conducted by the Australian Bureau of Statistics). |
| Cocos (Keeling) Islands | 593 | 370 | 62.39% | 113 | 19.06% | 257 | 43.34% | 2021 Australian census (conducted by the Australian Bureau of Statistics). |

- The European Union is a supranational union composed of 27 member states. The total English-speaking population of the European Union and the United Kingdom combined (2012) is 256,876,220 (out of a total population of 500,000,000, i.e. 51%) including 65,478,252 native speakers and 191,397,968 non-native speakers, and would be ranked 2nd if it were included. English native speakers amount to 13% of the whole population of the EU and the UK, while the percentage of people that speak English "well enough in order to be able to have a conversation", either as first (32%), second (11%) or third (3%) foreign language, was 38%.
- When taken from this list and added together, the total number of English speakers in the world adds up to around 1,430,000,000. Likewise, the total number of native English speakers adds up to around 410,000,000. This implies that there are approximately 1,020,000,000 people who speak English as an additional language.

== See also ==
- EF English Proficiency Index
- English medium education
- English-speaking world
- List of countries and territories where English is an official language
- World Englishes
- English-based creole languages

=== Non-English speaking populations by language ===
- Arabophone
- Bengali language
- Francophone
- Geographical distribution of Dutch speakers
- Geographical distribution of German speakers
- Hispanophone
- List of countries and territories where Hindustani is an official language
- List of countries and territories where Persian is an official language
- List of countries by Spanish-speaking population
- List of countries where Tamil is an official language
- Lusophone
- Malay language
- Persophone
- Russophone
- Sinophone
- Swahili language
- List of link languages

=== Non-English speaking populations by language, historical ===
- Latin language
- Mobilian trade language
- Phoenician language
- Sanskritisation (linguistics)

=== Non-English speaking populations by country ===
- Indosphere

=== Linguistic topics ===
- Dialect continuum
- Geolinguistics
- Language geography
- Link language
