= Tom Naegels =

Tom Naegels (born 14 October 1975, Antwerp) is a Belgian author and journalist.

Naegels' first significant publication was a collection of short stories titled Into the Universe. His novel Los (Loose) was published in 2005 and won the Gerard Walschap prize; the novel was adapted for a film that premiered in September 2008. Naegels' most recent book is Arusha.

Naegels' is also a columnist for the Belgian newspaper De Standaard.
