= Geographical distribution of Dutch speakers =

Dutch speakers, or Batavophones, are globally concentrated in the Netherlands, Belgium, and Suriname. Dutch is also spoken in minority areas through Europe and in many immigrant communities in all over the world. Afrikaans is a daughter language of Dutch, but is regarded as a separate language and will not be analyzed in this article.

== Statistics ==
=== Native speakers ===
Country	Absolute	%	Year	Reference
Austria	3,802	0.05%	2001	
Belgium	6,064,866	54.8%	2012	(Note: Population data by Eurostat, using the source year. "The number of persons having their usual residence in a country on 1 January of the respective year". ec.europa.eu.)
Canada	99,020	0.3%	2016	
Finland	1,650	0.03%	2018	
France	96,908	0.2%	2007	
Germany	102,000	0.1%	2023	
Indonesia	500,000	0.03%	1985	
Luxembourg	3,661	0.7%	2021	
Netherlands	15,766,786	94.2%	2012	
New Zealand	23,860	0.5%	2018	(Note: The reported population size was obtained by projecting the respondent percentage to the total population, since the source either included the part of the population who didn't answer or didn't take into account some parts of the population, for example children.)
South Africa	5,466	0.01%	1996	
Suriname	400,000	60%	2020	
Switzerland	22,167	0.3%	2011	
United Kingdom	30,407	0.05%	2011	
United States	183,885	0.1%	2017	

== See also ==
- Geolinguistics
- Language geography
