= Gert Hekma =

Dutch sociologist (1951–2022)

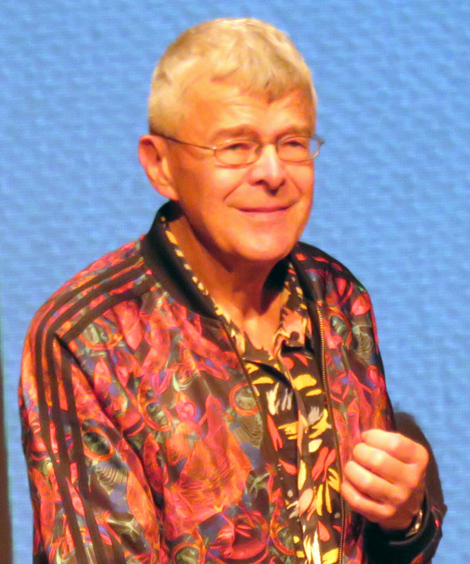
- Hekma during his Mosse Lecture, 2017
- Born: Gerhardus Hekma; 24 September 1951; Bedum, Netherlands
- Died: 19 April 2022 (aged 70); Amsterdam, Netherlands

Academic background
- Education: MS Cultural anthropology (Vrije Universiteit Amsterdam); PhD Historical anthropology (Utrecht University)
- Thesis: Homoseksualiteit, een medische reputatie : de uitdoktering van de homoseksueel in negentiende-eeuws Nederland (1987)

Academic work
- Discipline: Anthropologist, sociologist
- Sub-discipline: Gay and lesbian studies
- Institutions: University of Amsterdam

Gerhardus "Gert" Hekma (24 September 1951 – 19 April 2022) was a Dutch anthropologist and sociologist, known for his research and publications, and for his often controversial public statements about sexuality. He taught gay and lesbian studies at the Faculty of Social and Behavioral Sciences of the University of Amsterdam from 1984 to 2017.

== Career ==
Hekma finished Gymnasium-β, and in 1978 obtained his master's degree in Cultural anthropology at the Vrije Universiteit Amsterdam. From 1979 to 1981, he worked at Utrecht University. He was one of the organizers of the June 1983 social-scientific congress "Among Women, Among Men" (Dutch: "Onder Vrouwen, Onder Mannen"). In 1987, Hekma received his PhD in Historical anthropology from Utrecht University.

From 1984 (succeeding Mattias Duyves) until 2017, Hekma was an assistant professor and teacher at the University of Amsterdam, specializing in the sociology and history of (homo)sexuality. Hekma's research has been described as being "part of a marginal academic counterculture," and some of his statements, in particular about pedophilia and about sadomasochism, have been controversial and caused conflicts between him and some of his colleagues and the university board, and resulted in threats directed at Hekma. He was a member of the editorial board of Paidika: The Journal of Paedophilia in the 1990s.

Hekma has served as editor or editorial board member of many periodicals. He has also co-organized several conferences, and has studied the life and works of Jacob Israël de Haan, Louis Couperus, and Gerard Reve. He has taught students at Queens College and at the City College of San Francisco.

In 2017, three activities took place related to Hekma's retirement: a two-day symposium, "Perils and Pleasures: Confronting Erotic Diversions", in Amsterdam University Library; an exhibition, "Rooie Flikkers en Homostudies UvA", at IHLIA in the Openbare Bibliotheek Amsterdam; a Mosse Lecture by Hekma. The latter was organized by the George Mosse Fund, that he co-founded in 2001.

== Personal life ==
Hekma is the son of a notary and grew up in Bedum, the Netherlands. He was a frequent visitor of the DOK gay disco and was a member of the radical "Red Faggots" (Dutch: "Rooie Flikkers"). Hekma was a book collector, and had a fetish for satin. He was a fan of Marquis de Sade: not only is De Sade one of his favorite authors and a source of inspiration, Hekma was also fascinated by De Sade's position on violence, and has used De Sade to provide his students with another perspective on sexuality and violence. Hekma advocated against masculinity, paternalism and traditional gender roles.

External image
- Hekma (left) and Mattias Duyves in Portugal (1984), from Groene.nl.

In 2007, he received death threats after supporting the idea of including a boat for children at the Amsterdam Gay Pride. In 2014, Hekma co-created a petition addressed to the Supreme Court of the Netherlands, pleading with the Dutch Supreme Court to not ban pro-pedophilia association Vereniging MARTIJN. His support of MARTIJN resulted in death threats and an attempted burglary. Hekma has stated he was not a pedophile.

He and his significant other, sociologist Mattias Duyves (1953), were together for more than forty years. They met in 1977 and married in 2007. Both champion sexual and relational freedom.

Hekma was interviewed for John Scagliotti's documentary film Before Homosexuals (2017).

== Selected publications ==
Hekma published widely on the LGBT history in the Netherlands and Europe, both as a sole author and as a contributing editor. His publications include scientific works and popular documents. A selection follows:

- Homoseksualiteit, een medische reputatie [Homosexuality, a Medical Reputation] (1987)
- Goed verkeerd [Rightly Wrong] (1989)
- The Pursuit of Sodomy (1989)
- De roze rand van donker Amsterdam [The Pink Outskirts of Gloomy Amsterdam] (1992)
- Homoseksualiteit in Nederland van 1730 tot de moderne tijd [Homosexuality in The Netherlands from 1730 to Modern Times] (2004)
- ABC van perversies [The ABCs of Perversions] (2009)
- A Cultural History of Sexuality in the Modern Age (2011)
- Sexual Revolutions (2014)

== See also ==
- LGBT writers in the Dutch-language area
- LGBT history in the Netherlands
