= Huizinga Lecture =

Annual lecture in the Netherlands

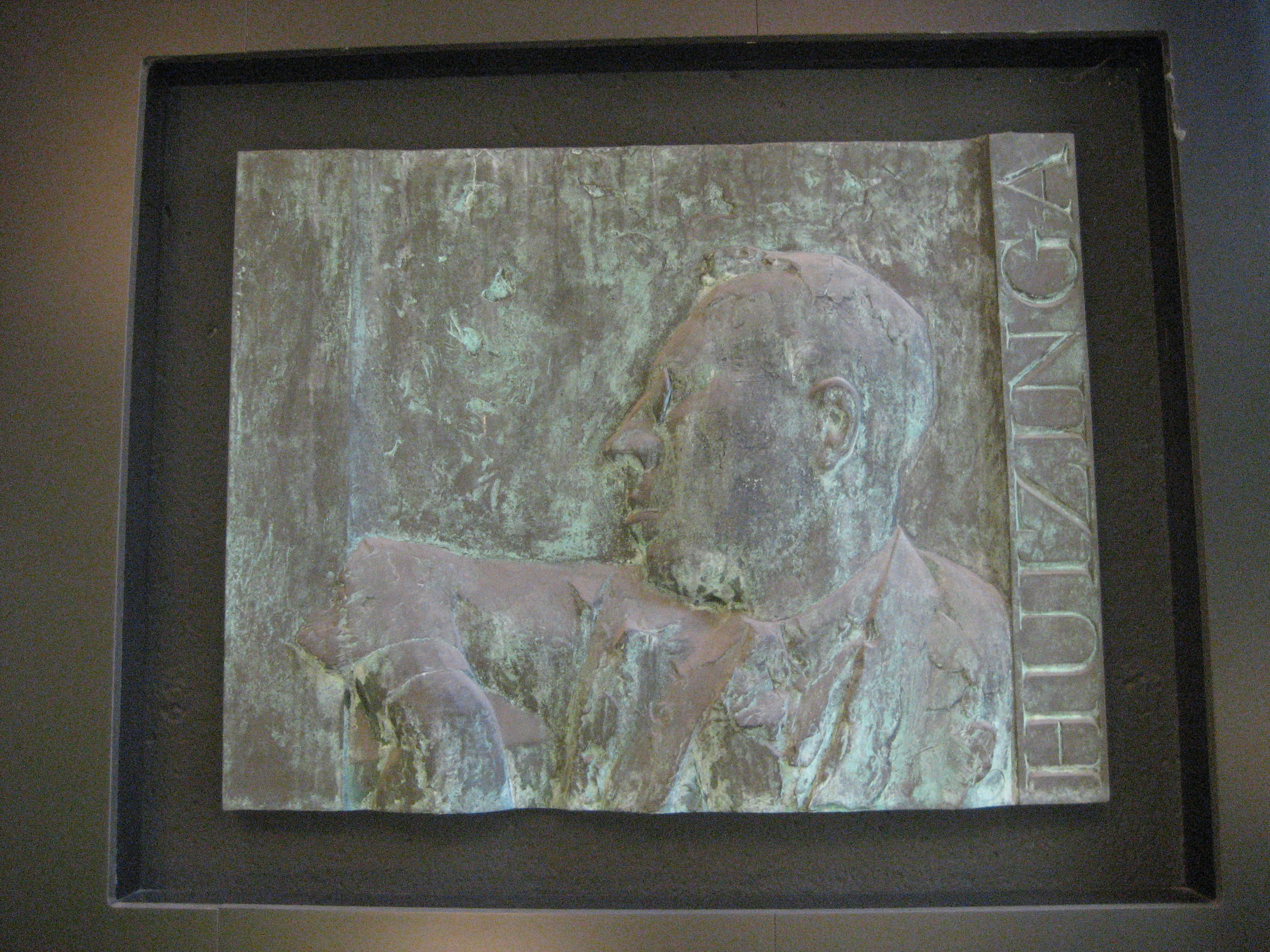
Relief of Johan Huizinga, after whom the lecture is named

The Huizinga Lecture (Dutch: Huizingalezing) is an annual lecture in the Netherlands about a subject in the domains of cultural history or philosophy. The lecture is in honour of Johan Huizinga, a distinguished Dutch historian (1872–1945) who worked in the first half of the 20th century. The Lecture is organized by nationwide daily general newspaper NRC Handelsblad, the Faculty of Humanities of Leiden University, and the Maatschappij der Nederlandse Letterkunde (Society of Dutch Literature). Attendance at the lecture was free of charge for subscribers to NRC Handelsblad, members of the Faculty of Humanities, and members of the Maatschappij der Nederlandse Letterkunde until 2010. From 2011 onwards tickets have to be bought. The lecture is held alternately by a Dutch and a non-Dutch intellectual.

The Huizinga Lecture started in 1972 and is held annually in December in the Pieterskerk in Leiden, The Netherlands.

== Lectures ==
This is a complete list of the Huizinga Lectures from the beginning in 1972 to the present date.

- 1972: Rudy Kousbroek – Ethologie en cultuurfilosofie (Ethology and cultural philosophy)
- 1973: Mary McCarthy – Can There Be a Gothic Literature?
- 1974: Jan Pen – De cultuur, het geld en de mensen (Civilization, money and the people)
- 1975: Jean-François Revel – La tentation totalitaire (The totalitarian temptation)
- 1976: Arthur Lehning – Over vrijheid en gelijkheid (On liberty and equality)
- 1977: Noam Chomsky – Intellectuals and the State
- 1978: Karel van het Reve – Literatuurwetenschap: het raadsel der onleesbaarheid (Literary studies. The enigma of unreadability)
- 1979: Golo Mann – 1914-1980: Ein Ueberblick (1914–1980, In vogelvlucht) (The period 1914-1980 seen with a birds-eye view)
- 1980: Ernst Kossmann – Over conservatisme (On Conservatism)
- 1981: Stefan Themerson – The Chair of Decency
- 1982: Renate Rubinstein – Links en rechts in de politiek en in het leven (Left and right in politics and life)
- 1983: Robert Darnton – The Meaning of Mother Goose
- 1984: Harry Mulisch – Het Ene (The unifying principle)
- 1985: Michael Howard – 1945: End of an Era?
- 1986: Huib Drion – Eliteproblemen (Elite problems)
- 1987: George Steiner – Through a Glass Darkly
- 1988: Peter Schat – Adem, een vergelijking (Breath, a metaphor)
- 1989: Susan Sontag – Traditions of the New or: Must We Be Modern?
- 1990: Gerrit Komrij – Over de noodzaak van tuinieren (On the imperative of gardening)
- 1991: Joseph Brodsky – In Praise of Clio
- 1992: E. de Jongh – Kunst en het vruchtbare misverstand (Art and the fruitful misunderstanding)
- 1993: Christian von Krockow – Schwierige Nähe. Zur Geschichte und Zukunft der Deutsch-Niederländischen Beziehungen (Hard neighborship: On the history and future of Dutch-German relations)
- 1994: A.Th. van Deursen – Huizinga en de geest der eeuw (Huizinga and the spirit of the age)
- 1995: Nadine Gordimer – Our Century
- 1996: Henk Wesseling – Zoekt Prof. Huizinga eigenlijk niet zichzelf? Huizinga en de geest van de jaren dertig (Is prof. Huizinga as a matter of fact in search of his own self? Huizinga and the spirit of the thirties)
- 1997: Richard Holmes – Biography and Death
- 1998: Louise Fresco – Schaduwdenkers en Lichtzoekers (Shadow thinkers and Light seekers)
- 1999: Jorge Semprún – Einde van de eeuw, begin van een millennium (End of a century. Beginning of a millennium)
- 2000: Ian Buruma – De neo-romantiek van schrijvers in exil (Neoromanticism of writers in exile)
- 2001: Wendy Doniger – Homo Ludens and Gallows Humor about the Holocaust and Terrorism
- 2002: Benno Barnard – Tegen de draad van de tijd: over de ware aard van Europa (Against the thread of the times. On the true nature of Europe)
- 2003: Abram de Swaan – Moord en de Staat (Murder and the State)
- 2004: A. S. Byatt – From Soul to Heart to Psyche to Personality
- 2005: Elmer Schönberger – Het grote luisteren (The big listening)
- 2006: Carlos Fuentes – The Two Traditions: La Mancha and Waterloo
- 2007: Tijs Goldschmidt – Doen alsof je doet alsof (Pretending to be pretending)
- 2008: Christopher Bayly – The Age of Revolution in the Wider World, 1780–1830, and Its Heritage
- 2009: Marita Mathijsen - Historische sensatiezucht. Over de moraal van de geschiedenis (Historical sensation seeking. On the moral of history.)
- 2010: Lisa Jardine - The Aftermath of Homo Ludens: From Huizinga to Zemon Davis and beyond
- 2011: Simon Schama - What happened to the idea of toleration?
- 2012: Geert van Istendael – De parochie van Sint-Precarius (The parish of St. Precarius)
- 2013: Bas Heijne - De betovering van de wereld (The enchantment of the world)
- 2014: Fik Meijer -Denken over Carthago. De erfenis van Duilius
- 2015: Johan Tollebeek - De paarden van Waterloo
- 2016: Ton Koopman - Bach en zijn zangers
- 2017: Antoine Bodar - Leven alsof God bestaat
- 2018: Jolande Withuis - Leve het Leven. Over vrijheid en de biografie
- 2019: Marlene Dumas - Het Onverantwoordelijke Gebaar - of ga terug naar waar jij vandaan komt
- 2020: Maxim Februari - Slechte kunst
- 2021: David Van Reybrouck - De kolonisatie van de toekomst
- 2022: Gunay Uslu - Cultuur geeft leven aan onze levens. Hoe Nederland cultuur waardeert. Van cultureel nationalisme tot corona en daarna (1872-2022 en verder)
- 2023: Ilja Leonard Pfeiffer - Over de aard en het nut van creativiteit
- 2024: Beatrice de Graaf - Wij zijn de tijden. Geschiedenis in crisistijd

== Sources ==
- Homepage Huizinga Lecture Leiden University
- Alle cultuur is streven. De verzamelde Huizinga-lezingen 1972-1986 (All culture is aspiration. The collected Huizinga Lectures 1972-1986) (with an introduction by H.L. Wesseling), Amsterdam: Bert Bakker 1987 ISBN 90-351-0567-2
