= Hafid Bouazza =

Moroccan-Dutch writer (1970–2021)

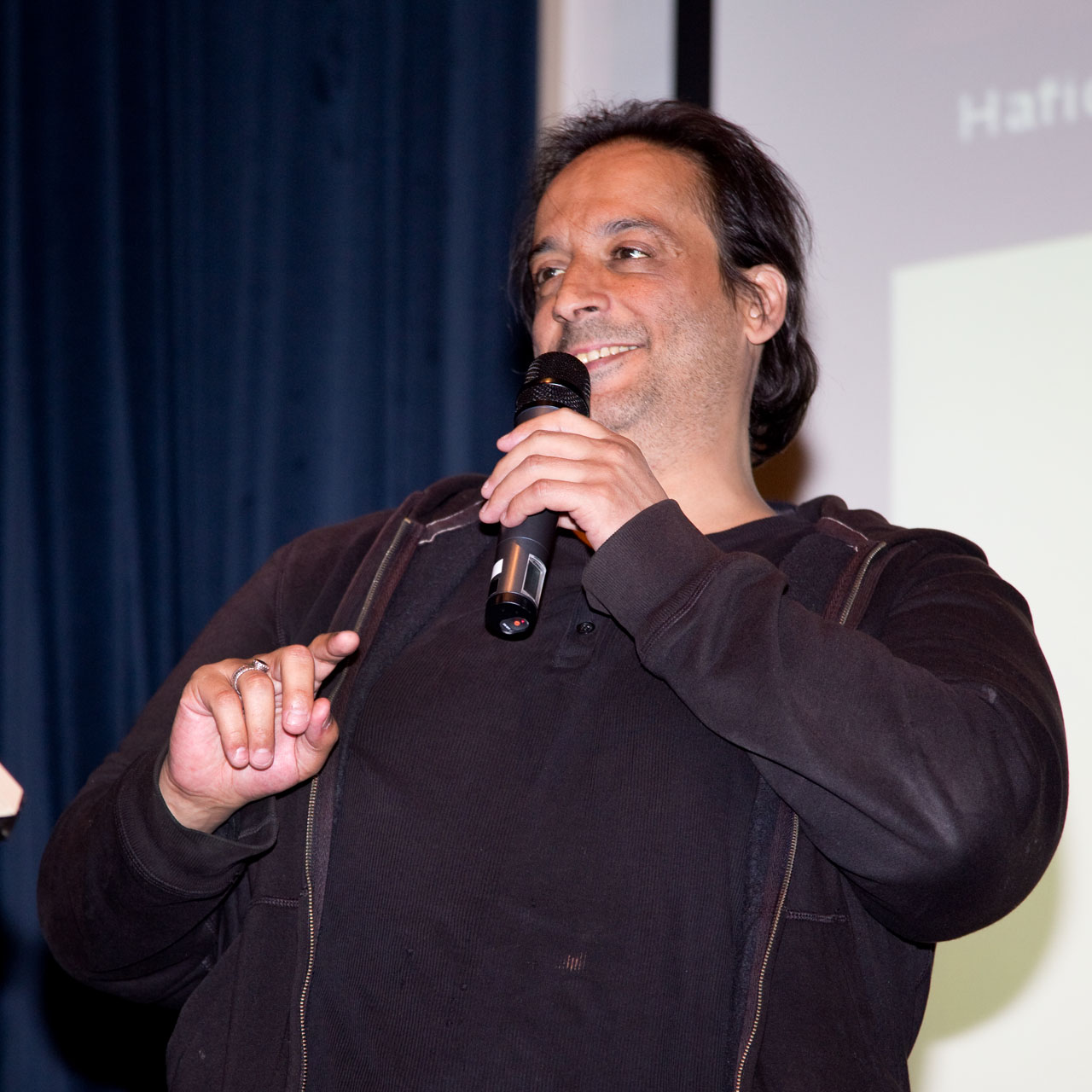
Hafid Bouazza honoured as "Freethinker of the Year" (2014).

Hafid Bouazza (Arabic: حفيظ بوعزة, ḥafīẓ būʿazza; 8 March 1970 – 29 April 2021) was a Moroccan-born Dutch writer, essayist and translator. His debut, the story collection De voeten van Abdullah (1996), won the E. du Perron Prize; his novel Paravion took the Golden Book-Owl in 2004.

== Early life ==
Bouazza was born in Oujda, close to the Algerian border. He was seven when the family followed his father to the Netherlands in October 1977. They settled in Arkel, a village near Gorinchem, where the father had already found work in an iron factory, and for years theirs was the only Moroccan household in the village. There were seven children. Books, films and music were part of daily life at home, and the parents pushed all of them to learn, in school and outside it.

In his teens Bouazza was a devout Muslim who prayed five times a day and knew parts of the Quran by heart. That changed. He later left the faith and described himself as an atheist.

His brother Abdellah, four years older, steered much of his reading. Stephen King came first, then Vladimir Nabokov, whose novel King, Queen, Knave Bouazza would later recall, in his 2001 Book Week essay Een beer in bontjas, as the great revelation of his youth. Abdellah stayed close to the work for decades, reading drafts with a severe eye and eventually translating some of it into English. Bouazza went on to study Arabic language and literature at the University of Amsterdam.

== Literary career ==
The route into print ran through De Balie in Amsterdam. Bouazza turned up at Al Farabi, the Arab cultural centre housed there, to pitch a theatre programme he had put together with two of his brothers, and met the novelist Jan van Aken, who worked at the centre. Van Aken read a few of his stories and passed his name to Oscar van Gelderen at the publisher Arena. Arena brought out De voeten van Abdullah in 1996. Its Dutch was archaic and ornate, the stories absurd and often deliberately provocative, and that put it some distance from the realist migrant narratives of writers such as Halil Gür and Kader Abdolah. Nabokov's influence on the prose is plain; so is that of classical Arabic literature.

The novella Momo followed in 1998, then the novels Salomon (2001), Paravion (2003), Spotvogel (2009) and Meriswin (2014). Alongside the fiction he wrote plays, essays and the libretto for a chamber opera, Het monster met de twee ruggen (2003). He translated Othello and The Taming of the Shrew into Dutch and compiled several anthologies of classical and erotic Arabic poetry. Paravion won the Golden Book-Owl in 2004 and was shortlisted for the AKO Literatuurprijs. In 2003 he was a guest on the VPRO interview programme Zomergasten.

Critics tended to file him under "migrant literature", next to Abdelkader Benali and Moses Isegawa. Bouazza disliked the label intensely. A writer who wrote in Dutch was a Dutch writer, he argued, and he saw no need to carry around what he called a "topographical hunchback". The literary scholar Liesbeth Minnaard, who has written on his work, has pointed out that early reviewers read De voeten van Abdullah as a glimpse into Moroccan culture, a reading the stories themselves hardly support.

== Public debate ==
After 2001 Bouazza became a regular voice in the Dutch argument over Islam, writing columns, opinion pieces and essays that were openly hostile to the religion. In 2002 he gave the Mosse Lecture, under the title Homoseksualiteit en Islam (Homosexuality and Islam). Opinion on these interventions split sharply. Minnaard came to regard some of the later pieces as Islamophobic and called him a "professional provocateur", while the writer Mohammed Benzakour argued that Bouazza had pushed other writers and thinkers of migrant background to state their own positions in public. In 2014 the Dutch freethinkers' association De Vrije Gedachte named him "Freethinker of the Year".

== Illness and death ==
Bouazza drank heavily for much of his adult life and was admitted to hospital several times with liver failure. Meriswin, his last novel, turns on a man who lands in hospital after years of drinking and slips into delirium. When he presented the book on the talk show Pauw & Witteman on 1 May 2014, he spoke frankly about having been through the same thing.

He was admitted again in April 2021 and died in an Amsterdam hospital on 29 April, aged 51. His younger sister, Hassnae Bouazza, is a journalist and novelist.

== Legacy ==
Paravion appears on the list of the fifty best Dutch-language books of the 21st century drawn up by NRC and De Standaard. Younger writers still cite him; Safae el Khannoussi, author of Oroppa, has named him as an influence. His collected prose, Verzameld proza, was published by Prometheus in 2026.

== Works ==
- 1996 De voeten van Abdullah (The feet of Abdullah)
- 1998 Momo
- 1998 Apollien
- 2000 Schoon in elk oog is wat het bemint (Beauty in each eye is what it loves)
- 2001 Een beer in bontjas: autobiografische beschouwingen (A bear in a fur coat: autobiographical reflections)
- 2001 De slachting in Parijs (The Massacre at Paris)
- 2001 Salomon
- 2002 Rond voor rond of als een pikhouweel (Round for round, or like a pickaxe)
- 2003 Othello
- 2003 Het monster met de twee ruggen: een kameropera (The beast with two backs: a chamber opera)
- 2003 Paravion
- 2005 Het temmen van een feeks (The Taming of the Shrew)
- 2006 De zon kussen op dit nachtuur (Kissing the sun at this hour of night)
- 2006 De vierde gongslag (The fourth stroke of the gong)
- 2006 Om wat er nog komen moet: pornografica (For what is still to come: pornographica)
- 2009 Spotvogel (Icterine warbler)
- 2011 Heidense vreugde (Pagan joy)
- 2014 Meriswin
- 2015 De akker en de mantel (The field and the cloak)
- 2026 Verzameld proza (Collected prose)
