= George Mosse Fund =

Dutch foundation

- George Mosse Fonds
- Named after: George Mosse
- Formation: 2001
- Fields: Queer studies
- Official language: Dutch
- Parent organization: University of Amsterdam
- Affiliations: IHLIA LGBT Heritage
- Website: mosse.nl

The Foundation George Mosse Fund of the University of Amsterdam (Stichting George Mosse Fonds van de Universiteit van Amsterdam) is a Dutch foundation (stichting) that aims to promote gay and lesbian studies. It was founded in 2001 at the University of Amsterdam, with a bequest from George Mosse's inheritance, given out of appreciation for the cultural-historical education and research on homosexuality in Amsterdam. The foundation is known primarily for its annual lecture.

== Mosse Lectures ==
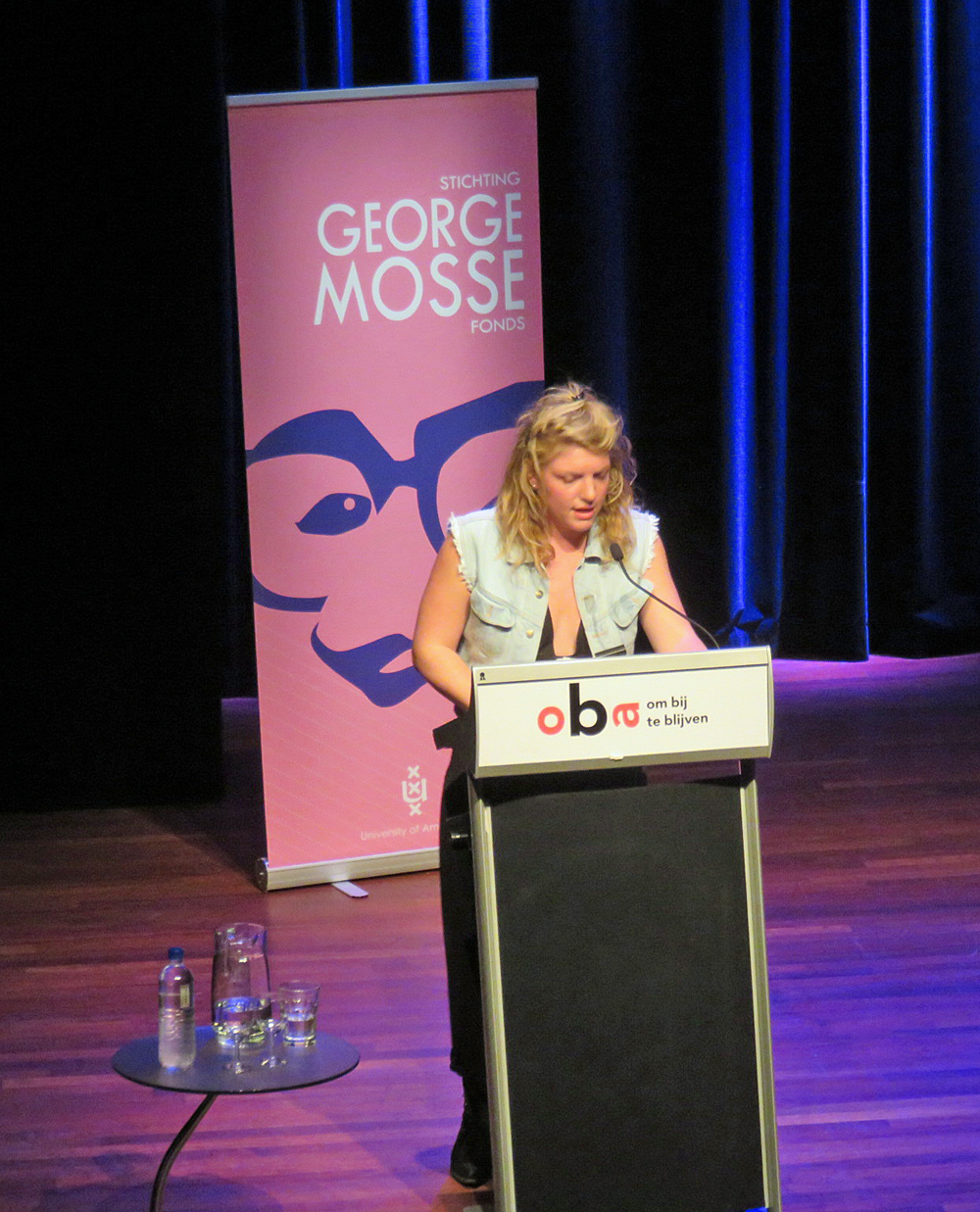
Simone van Saarloos during her Mosse Lecture of 2016.

An initiative of the George Mosse Fund, the Mosse Lectures is a series of public lectures held annually in Amsterdam, organized by the George Mosse Fund, in collaboration with IHLIA. The series was inaugurated by Hafid Bouazza, a Moroccan-Dutch writer

Year	Lecturer	Title	Ref.
2002	Hafid Bouazza	"Homoseksualiteit en Islam" [Homosexuality and Islam]	
2003	Marjan Sax	"Naar een nieuwe seksuele revolutie" [Towards a new sexual revolution]	
2004	Dolly Bellefleur (Ruud Douma)	"Transformatiekunst, miskende muze" [Transformation art, unsung muse]	
2005	Bas Heijne	"De eeuwige homo" [The eternal gay]	
2006	Maaike Meijer	"Leve de penisnijd" [Long live the penis envy]	
2007	Gerardjan Rijnders	"De buik vol" [The belly full]	
2008	Gerrit Komrij	"Waarom zijn Nederlanders zo dol op homoseksuelen?" [Why are the Dutch so fond of homosexuals?]	
2009	Gloria Wekker	"Van Homo Nostalgie en betere tijden. Multiculturaliteit en postkolonialiteit" [On Gay Nostalgia and better times. Multiculturalism and postcolonialism]	
2010	Stephan Sanders	"Homoseksualiteit & het Goede Leven. Over homoseksueel denken, doen en zijn" [Homosexuality & the Good Life. About homosexual thinking, doing and being]	
2011	Maxim Februari (Marjolijn Februari)	"Wat is seks eigenlijk?" [What exactly is sex?]	
2012	Ted van Lieshout	"Drijft de emancipatie homo's terug in de kast?" [Is emancipation driving gays back in the closet?]	
2013	Jet Bussemaker	"Grenzen aan homo-emancipatiebeleid: burgerwacht of politieagent? – Over de 'red lines' van het homo-emancipatiebeleid" [Limits to gay emancipation policy: civilian or police officer? - About the 'red lines' of the gay emancipation policy]	
2014	Mohammed Benzakour	"HoMa: Zwierige redder in nood" [HoMa: Graceful lifesaver]	
2015	Hedy d'Ancona	"Voorbij de M/V-maatschappij?" [Beyond the M/F society?]	
2016	Simone van Saarloos	"Are You Out To Be Gay?"	
2017	Gert Hekma	"Vijftig jaar homo-acceptatie uit de kast. Van onbereikbaar ideaal tot ontoereikend perspectief" [Fifty years of gay acceptance out of the closet. From unreachable ideal to inadequate perspective]	
2018	Karin Spaink	"Tussen Grewel en Fortuyn: Identiteit, herzuiling, privilege en verschil" [Between Grewel and Fortuyn: Identity, re-pillarification, privilege and difference]	
2019 (Jan.)	Joke Swiebel	"1969: roze revolutie of verloren strijd?" [1969, pink revolution or lost battle?]	
2019 (Sep.)	David Weissman	“From activist filmmaker to queer community elder” [lecture in English]	
2024	Haroon Ali	"Onder één vlag?" [Under One Flag?]	
2025	Lisa Weeda	“Het archief-Jilles: een brief aan mijn grootvader” [The Jilles Archives: A Lettter to My Grandfather]	

o lectures were given, by Joke Swiebel and David Weissman respectively.

Due to the covid19-epeidemic, no Mosse lectures were held in 2020, 2021, 2022, and 2023.

== See also ==
- List of public lecture series
- LGBT history in the Netherlands
