= Schwules Museum =

Museum of LGBT+ history in Berlin

Coordinates: 52°29′27″N 13°23′16″E

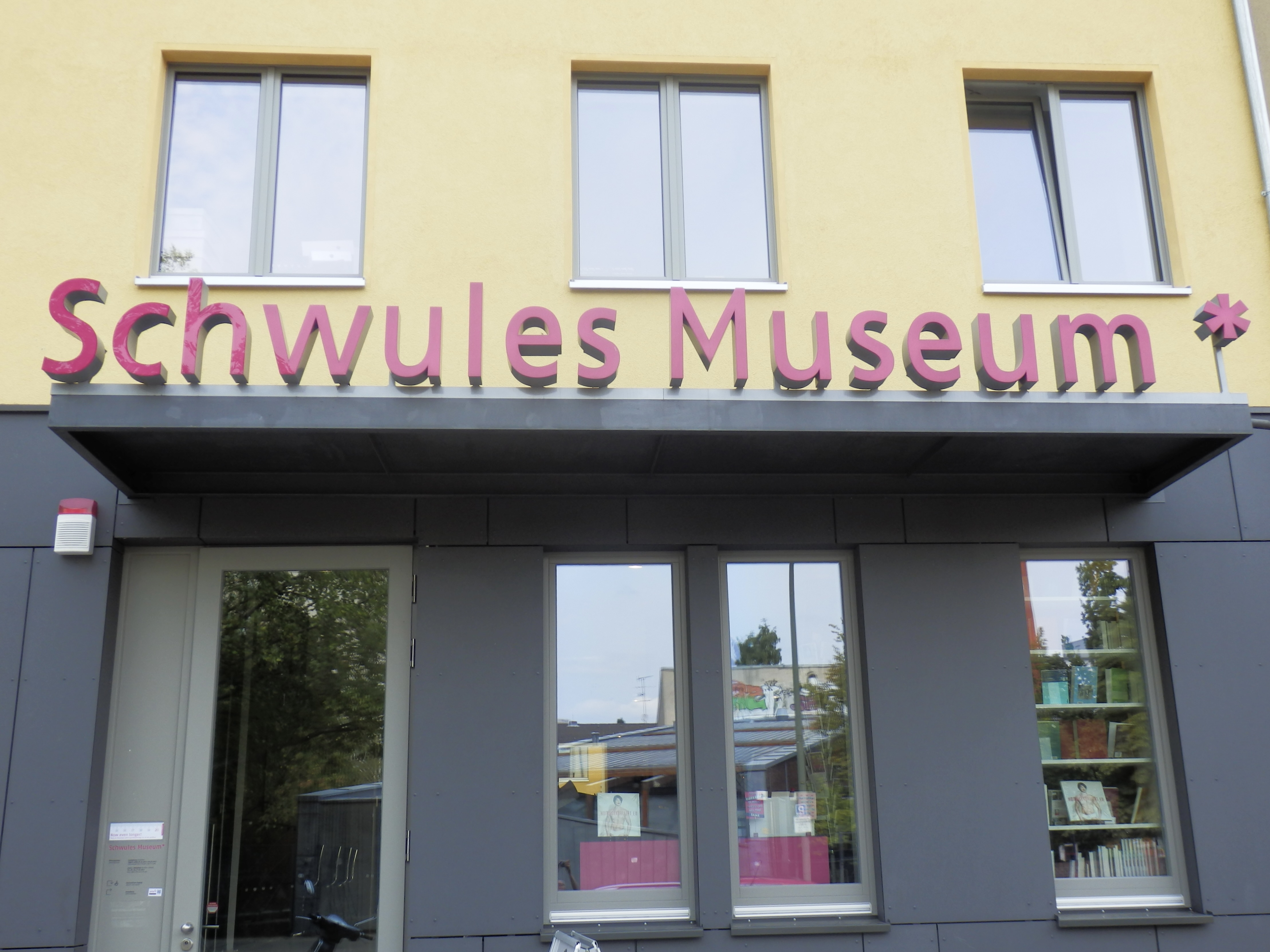
- Established: 1985
- Location: Lützowstraße 73, 10785 Berlin, Germany
- Website: www.schwulesmuseum.de

The Schwules Museum (English: Gay Museum) in Berlin, Germany, is a museum and research centre with collections focusing on LGBTQ+ history and culture. It opened in 1985 and it was the first museum in the world dedicated to gay history.

The museum archive holds periodicals dating from 1896 and a collection of photographs, videos, films, sound recordings, autographs, art works, and ephemera. Its library holds approximately 20,000 books on homosexuality.

== Location ==
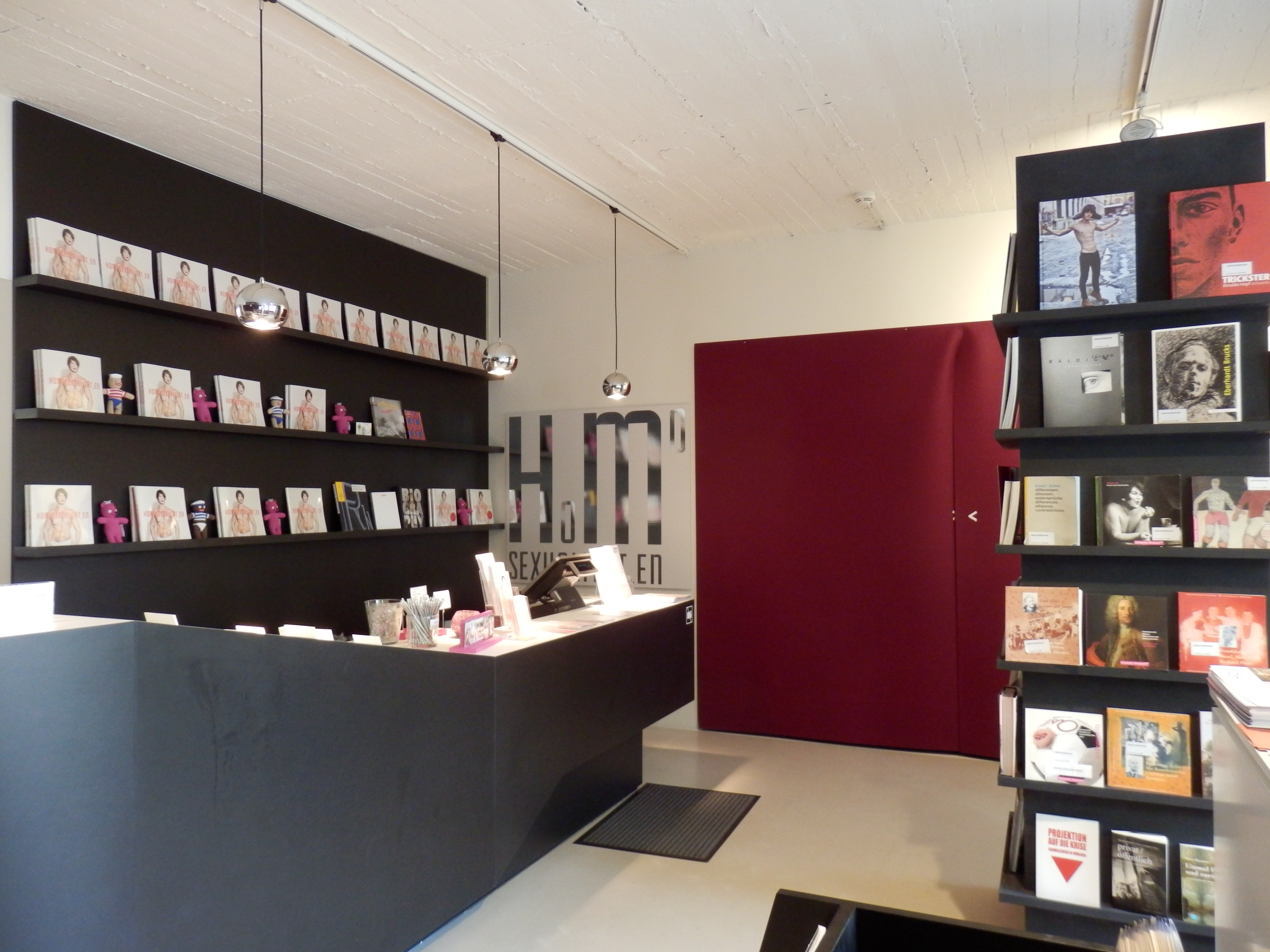
Museums shop in the Schwules Museum, 2015

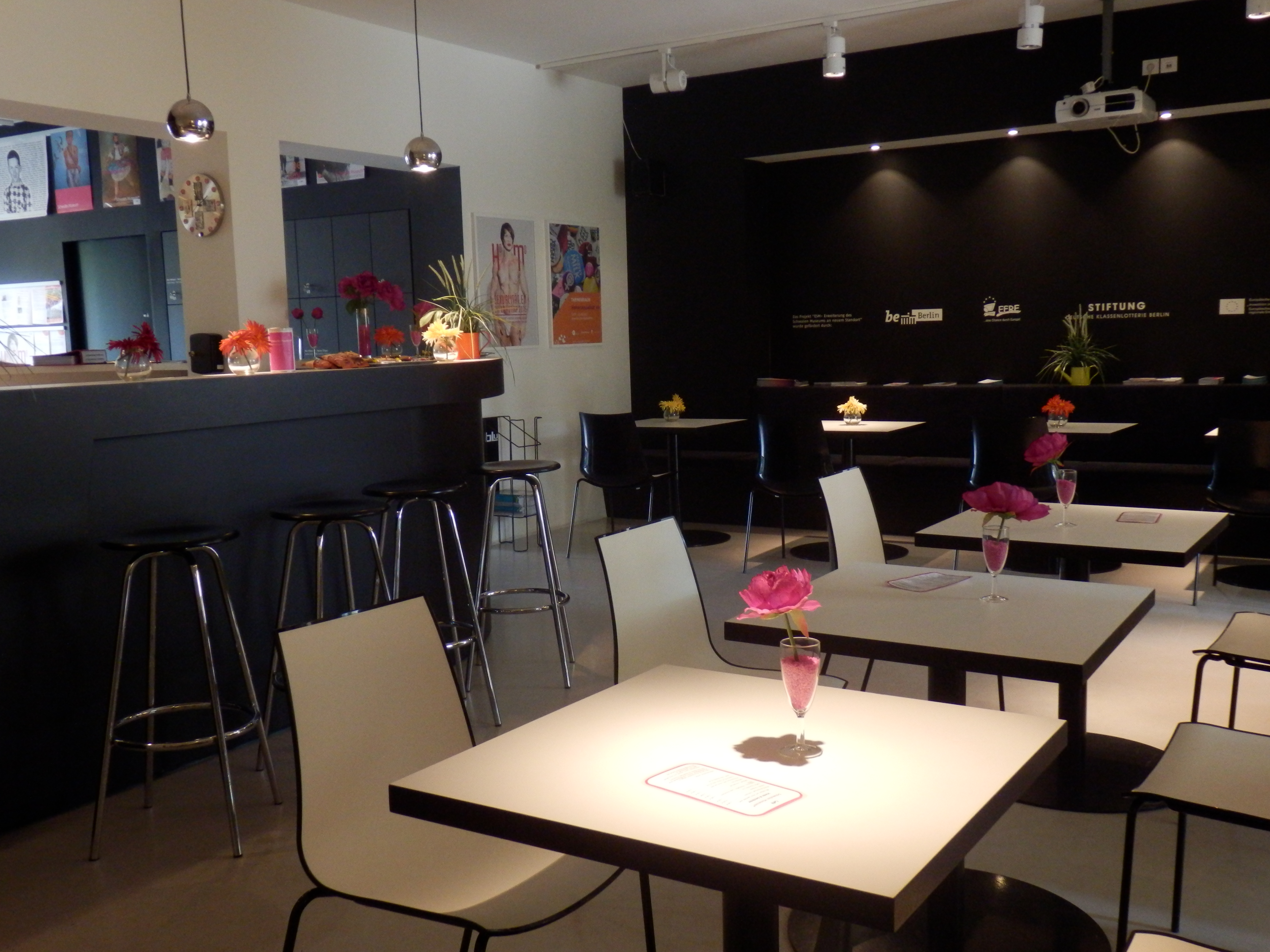
Café in the Schwules Museum, 2015

The museum was first located at Mehringdamm 61 in Kreuzberg when it was founded in 1985, and since the summer of 2013, it has been located in a former printing factory (1,600 m^{2}) at Lützowstraße 73 in Tiergarten, more than doubling its exhibition space.

== History and mission ==
The impetus for the founding of the Schwules Museum was a successful exhibition on gay topics at the West Berlin Berlin Museum (which would later be consolidated into the Märkisches Museum) in summer 1984, called "Eldorado - Homosexual Women and Men in Berlin 1850-1950". It was the first public exhibition shown in Germany of recent research on gay life. In 1985 the Verein der Freunde eines Schwulen Museums in Berlin e.V. (Society of Friends of a Gay Museum in Berlin) was founded and opened its own museum dedicated exclusively to LGBTQ+ topics at Mehringdamm 61 in the district of Kreuzberg. The building acquired the nickname Homo-Hof ("the gay courtyard") because it also housed the gay nightclub SchwuZ, a gay-friendly café and the Allgemeine Homosexuelle Arbeitsgemeinschaft, a support group which campaigns for LGBTQ+ rights.

In December 2009, the museum received its first allocation of public money, a two-year grant from the cultural funds of the Berlin Senate. This was used to broaden its focus to encompass other minority sexual identities besides male homosexuality, mainly to put more emphasis on lesbian and transgender people.

== Exhibitions ==
The museum shows several temporary exhibitions every year. These include historical exhibitions illuminating particular periods or historical developments, such as:

- 1997 - Goodbye to Berlin.100 Jahre Schwulenbewegung ("Goodbye to Berlin: 100 Years of the Gay Rights Movement")
- 2000 - Verfolgung homosexueller Männer in Berlin 1933–45 ("Persecution of Homosexual Men in Berlin 1933–45"), in collaboration with the Sachsenhausen concentration camp memorial, which dealt with the persecution of homosexuals in Nazi Germany and the Holocaust.
- 2015 - Homosexuality_ies, an exhibition jointly presented by the Schwules Museum and the German Historical Museum which was funded by the German Federal Cultural Foundation and the Cultural Foundation of the German states. It displayed a wide range of material on the history, politics and culture of homosexuality.

From December 2004 to May 2013, there was a permanent exhibition called Selbstbewusstsein und Beharrlichkeit. 200 Jahre schwule Geschichte ("Self-Awareness and Endurance: 200 Years of Gay History"). It covers period 1790 to 1990, showing how gay people met up with each other and organised networks, and depicted the strategies, options and problems of gay people in seeking to live a self-determined life. In association with this theme, the social and legal background was presented, such as the anti-gay Paragraph 175 of the German penal code; the associated marginalisation, persecution and criminalisation of homosexuality; as well as the successes of LGBT social movements.

The museum also holds series of exhibitions on individuals, groups and organisations, such as Der Kreis ("The Circle") and Gesellschaft für Reform des Sexualrechts ("Society for the Reform of Sexual Law"). A continuing series of homages to LGBT people in public life has included Oscar Wilde, Marlene Dietrich, Rainer Werner Fassbinder, Michel Foucault and Thomas Mann.

== Bibliography ==
- Bollé, Michael (ed.) (1984) Eldorado: Homosexuelle Frauen und Männer in Berlin, 1850–1950: Geschichte, Alltag und Kultur. Berlin: Frölich und Kaufmann, 1984. ISBN 3-88725-068-0. 2nd ed. (1992) Berlin: Verein der Freunde eines Schwulen Museums in Berlin e.V. ISBN 3-89468-032-6.

== See also ==
- Centrum Schwule Geschichte (Cologne)
- GLBT Historical Society (San Francisco)
- ONE National Gay & Lesbian Archives (Los Angeles)
- QUEER BRITAIN (London)
- IHLIA LGBT Heritage
