= Beatrice de Graaf =

Dutch historian

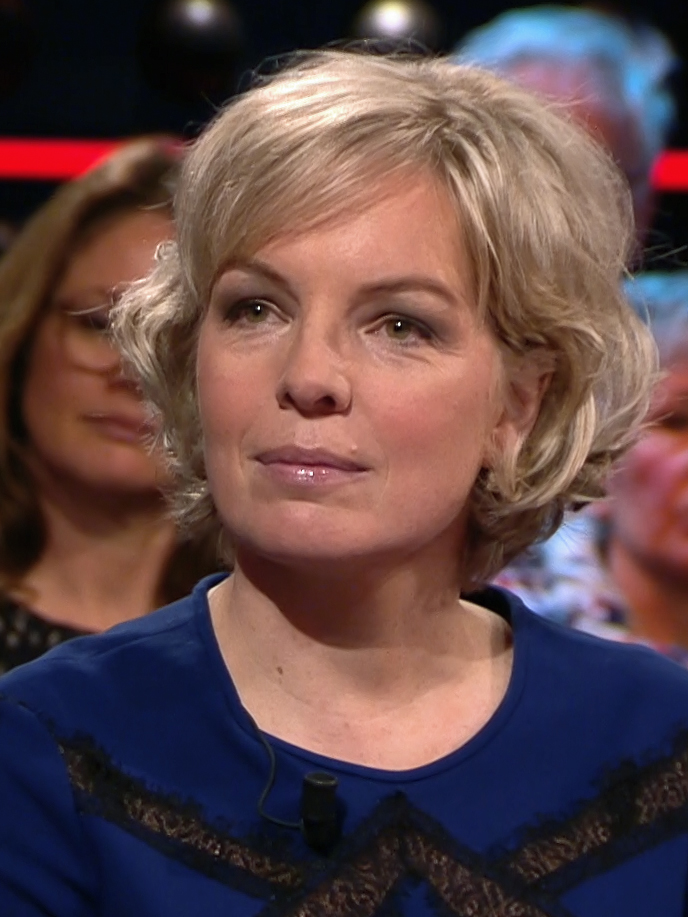
- Beatrice de Graaf in 2018
- Born: 19 April 1976 (age 50); Putten
- Occupation: Faculty Professor

Academic work
- Discipline: History
- Sub-discipline: Modern history Terrorism
- Institutions: University of Utrecht

Beatrice A. de Graaf (born 19 April 1976) is a Dutch history professor at the Faculty of Humanities at Utrecht University. Her areas of expertise are terrorism, international relations and security and the modern history of Europe.

== Career ==
De Graaf studied History and German at the University of Utrecht and the University of Bonn. In December 2004 she obtained her PhD with a dissertation on the relationship between the GDR, the peace movement and the Dutch churches. In 2005 she received the Max van der Stoel Human Rights Prize. After her PhD, De Graaf worked in Utrecht as a university lecturer. In 2007 she transferred to Leiden University, where she co-founded the Centre for Terrorism and Counterterrorism (CTC), attached to The Hague campus. In 2012, she was appointed professor of 'Conflict and security in historical perspective' at the CTC. In February 2014 she returned to Utrecht University, where she holds the chair entitled 'History of International Relations & Global Governance'.

As a historian, De Graaf puts security and counterterrorism in a historical context and aims to not only target an international-scientific audience but also contribute to a deeper understanding of these phenomena with her public books. Her book Against Terror. How Europe became safe after Napoleon (2018), was nominated for the Libris History Prize. Her 2021 book Radical Redemption: What Terrorists Believe was nominated for the Prize for the Most Important Book of the Year in the Netherlands, and for the Trouw and Nederlands Dagblad Best Theology Book in 2021/22.

De Graaf's overarching research theme is the history of security and (counter)terrorism since the nineteenth century. Between 2009 and 2013 she conducted research in this area with a grant funded by the Dutch Research Council for the project Enemies of the State, and as a Fellow of the Netherlands Institute for Advanced Study (NIAS). In 2014 she received an ERC Consolidator Grant for the Securing Europe: Fighting its Enemies Project, for which she and a team of historians conducted research into the development of European security regimes between 1815 and 1914. She also carries out various research activities into terrorism and security in the twenty-first century, such as on the social effects of lawsuits against terrorists. In Terrorists on Trial, and several other publications, she shows how the 'pre-emptive turn' has also made its appearance in law, and how terrorism trials have increasingly become the subject of risk justice.

With her research team, de Graaf maps how societies and governments deal with war, conflict and crisis, and how they shape their security culture - as a result of threat, interest and security practices - around it. She is also part of the Adapt Academy. In the ADAPT Academy, researchers from Utrecht University, Leiden University, Radboud University, Vrije Universiteit Amsterdam and the University of Twente work together, with the aim of building more knowledge and expertise on the adaptive capacity of societies in times of crisis.

De Graaf also specialises in German history and the history of German-Dutch relations (following in the footsteps of her PhD supervisors Friso Wielenga and Duco Hellema). In 2018 she discovered evidence in Berlin's archives that pointed to Queen Wilhelmina's involvement in the preparations for Emperor William II's arrival in the Netherlands, in November 1918.

Since 2019 De Graaf is a distinguished professor at the Utrecht University. Her book Tegen terreur was translated to English in 2020 by the Cambridge University Press as Fighting Terror after Napoleon. Historian Michael Rowe, from King's College London, reviewed her book and wrote: "This well-written, engaging book combines an international-relations and systems perspective with historical methods and approaches." On 12 December 2024, De Graaf gave the annual Huizinga Lecture, which was named We Are the Times: History in Times of Crisis.

=== International Fellowships ===
De Graaf was a Visiting Fellow at St Catherine's College and the History Faculty of the University of Cambridge in 2016. In that year she was also Fellow at the University of California, Los Angeles. She was also a fellow at the Programme on Extremism/ISIS Files project, George Washington University. Together with Ahmet S. Yahla she wrote a report for this project about the Shurta police of the Islamic State. Another Fellowship De Graaf hold is at the Center for Advanced Security, Strategic and Integration Studies (CASSIS) of the University of Bonn.

== Wider work ==
In 2017, de Graaf was elected a member of the Royal Netherlands Academy of Arts and Sciences. She is also a member of the Academia Europaea, having been elected in 2020. She is the editor of Terrorism and Political Violence, as well as the Journal of Modern European History.

De Graaf was a member of De Jonge Akademie of the Royal Netherlands Academy of Arts and Sciences, the European Council on Foreign Relations, and various advisory committees in the field of national and international security. She was a member of the Joustra Committee on inter-country adoption and the Muller Committee on the revision of the Security Regions Act. As a terrorism expert and security historian, she regularly comments on current affairs in the media. On behalf of Terrorism and Political Violence and the Security History Network, she runs a podcast and is a recurring guest on the Ongelooflijke Podcast and on the Napoleonic Wars Podcast a podcast about the Revolutionary and Napoleonic wars. De Graaf is also a member of the advisory board of the Society and Security Foundation (SMV). She is also a trustee for the Napoleonic & Revolutionary War Graves Charity.

From November 2004 to June 2013, De Graaf was chairman of the Association of Christian Historians. In 1998 she became editor of Transparant (nl), the quarterly magazine of the VCH. She is a member of the Christian Union and was fifth on the candidate list for that party for the election to the Senate in 2015.

De Graaf is committed to increasing investment in research and science, and to increasing the impact of science in state and society. On 23 January 2015, Beatrice de Graaf was appointed chair of the National Science Agenda together with Alexander Rinnooy Kan. De Graaf has been writing a column for the NRC since 2018. In 2022, together with KNAW colleagues, she published the guide 'Science with the windows open'. In 2022 she was asked to write the essay for the Dutch history month.

== Awards ==
- 2005: Max van der Stoel human rights prize
- 2011: Lecturer Prize, Koninklijke Nederlandse Akademie van Wetenschappen
- 2011: Excellent Female Researcher Prize, Landelijk Netwerk Vrouwelijke Hoogleraren
- 2012: Evaluating Counterterrorism Performance (2011, monograph) included in the global top 150 books on terrorism (Perspectives on Terrorism)
- 2016: UU Publiprijs, Prize for best presentation and public education in the media
- 2017: Language State Master.
- 2018: Stevin Prize (2.5 million euros) awarded by the NWO.
- 2018: Opzij Top 100 - most influential woman in the Netherlands in the Education and Science category.
- 2022: Comeniusprijs, awarded in recognition of her historical insight and contribution to solving societal problems.
- 2022: Arenberg Prize for European History for Fighting Terror after Napoleon: How Europe Became Secure after 1815.

== Publications ==
- de Graaf, Beatrice; Drost, Niels (2026). Poetins tsaristische droom: Geschiedenis als wapen in de Russische politiek. Amsterdam: Prometheus. ISBN 9789044658453.
- de Graaf, Beatrice (2022). Crisis!. Amsterdam: Prometheus. ISBN 9789044650655.
- de Graaf, Beatrice. (2021). Radicale verlossing. Wat terroristen geloven. Amsterdam: Prometheus. ISBN 9789044646573.
- de Graaf, Beatrice, & Yayla, Ahmet (2021). Policing as Rebel Governance. The Islamic State Police. (The ISIS Files). Program on Extremism.
- de Graaf, Beatrice (2021). Red, White, and Blood: White Terror and Great Fear, 1789-2021. In: Age of Revolutions.
- de Graaf, Beatrice (2020). Fighting Terror after Napoleon. How Europe became Secure after 1815. Cambridge: Cambridge University Press. ISBN 9781108842068.
- de Graaf, Beatrice; de Haan, I.; Vick, B. (2019). Securing Europe after Napoleon: 1815 and the new European security culture. Cambridge: Cambridge University press. ISBN 9781108428224.0
- de Graaf, Beatrice (2018). Tegen de terreur: Hoe Europa veilig werd na Napoleon. Amsterdam: Prometheus. ISBN 9789035144583.
- de Graaf, Beatrice; Zwierlein, Cornel (2013). "Historicizing Security. Entering the Conspiracy Dispositive". Historical Social Research. 38 (1): 46–64.
