= Hassnae Bouazza =

Moroccan-Dutch journalist, writer, columnist, translator and television programme maker

Hassnae Bouazza (Arabic: حسناء بوعزة, ḥasnāʾ būʿazza; born 1973) is a Moroccan-Dutch journalist, writer, columnist, translator and television programme maker.

== Life ==
Bouazza was born in the city of in Oujda, Morocco, close to the Algerian border. She moved with her family including brother Hafid (now a noted writer) to the Netherlands to join her father, who worked there as a guest worker. They lived in the village of Arkel where they were the only Moroccans. Bouazza studied English language and literature at Utrecht University. She started writing columns for various periodicals (including Vrij Nederland. Bouazza also worked for the VPRO as a television programme maker. She is known for discussing taboo subjects like pornography in the Arab world. Bouazza is the editor of a collection of short stories called Achter de sluier (Behind the Veil) about strong Arab women.

== Works ==
- 1999 Achter de Sluier (Behind the Veil)
- 2013 Arabieren kijken – de alledaagse revolutie (Watching Arabs – the everyday revolution)
- 2014 Seks en de Zonde (Sex and the Sin)

2022: Een koffer vol citroenen
