= Centrum Schwule Geschichte =

German LGBT organization

Coordinates: 50°55′57″N 7°0′55″E

Centrum Schwule Geschichte e. V. (meaning: Gay History Centre), abbreviated CSG, is a German "LGBTQ" organization based in Cologne (Köln). The organisation was established in 1984 and maintains an office in the district of Kalk; its predecessor were the Rheinisches Schwulenarchiv and the Arbeitskreis schwule Geschichte.

== Overview ==
CSG maintains a publicly open library and archive, both relating to the history of homosexuality and activism in Germany, with a focus on the homosexual subcultures of Cologne and the Rhineland. Historic documents reach back as far as the 1230s, but it has a more comprehensive inventory on magazines and other publications from the 20th century. Centrum Schwule Geschichte also organizes exhibitions, lectures and other presentations, while CSG's work has also been published in books and magazines. Invertito - Jahrbuch für die Geschichte der Homosexualitäten (Annual For The History Of Homosexualities) is co-owned by the organization.

== Exhibitions ==
Permanent Exhibition

- Himmel und Hölle. 100 Jahre schwul in Köln permanent exhibition since 2005; vernissage on 27. June 2002 im conjunction with Europride 2002

Temporary exhibitions

- Aufklärung und Aufregung - 50 Jahre Schwule und Lesben in der BRAVO., 2010
- Anders als die Andern. Schwule und Lesben in Köln und Umgebung 1895-1918, 2007 at the University of Cologne
- Troubles in Paradise. 30 Jahre Schwulen- und Lesbenzentren in Köln, 2005
- Phönix in Asche. Fotografien von Hans-Jürgen Esch, 2003
- Hannes Steinert: "Das Glück ist ein Augenblick" Art exhibition, 2002.
- Aufgespießt ... Homosexualität in der Karikatur, 2002
- Volksaufklärung per Verlagspolitik. Max Spohr (1850-1905), Verleger in Leipzig, 2001
- Gegen die Regeln. Lesben und Schwule im Sport., 2000 at Deutsches Sport- und Olympiamuseum
- Registriert. Polizei und Homosexuelle, 2000
- St. Sebastian oder Die schwule Kunst zu leiden, 1999
- Who Cares? Patrick Hamm: Video Stills, 1999
- Poster, Posen, Pornos. Zum homosexuellen Männerbild 1945 bis 1998, 1998
- Die Harten und die Zarten. Die Darstellung von Homosexualität im Film, 1998
- "Das sind Volksfeinde!" Kölner Sonderaktion gegen Homosexuelle im Sommer 1938, 1998 at EL-DE-Haus (NS-Dokumentationszentrum)
- Enthüllungen! Die 1. Kölner Reliquienausstellung aus über 2000 Jahren schwuler Geschichte, 1995
- "Verführte Männer." Das Leben der Kölner Homosexuellen im Dritten Reich, 1991
- Dornröschen. Das Leben der "Verzauberten" im Köln der 20er Jahre, 1987 at Kölner Schwulen- und Lesbenzentrum.

== Publications ==
- C. Limpricht/J. Müller/N. Oxenius (Hg.): Verführte Männer. Das Leben der Kölner Homosexuellen im Dritten Reich, Emons Verlag, Köln 1991, ISBN 3-924491-74-7
- K. Balser/M. Kramp/J. Müller/J. Gotzmann (Hg.): Himmel und Hölle. Das Leben der Kölner Homosexuellen 1945 bis 1969, Emons-Verlag, Köln 1994, ISBN 3-924491-54-2
- J. Müller/W. Berude (Hg.): Das sind Volksfeinde. Die Verfolgung von Homosexuellen an Rhein und Ruhr von 1933 bis 1945, Emons-Verlag, Köln 1998, ISBN 3-89705-124-9
- E. In het Panhuis: Die Harten und die Zarten. Homosexualität im Film, Köln 1998
- E. In het Panhuis / H. Potthoff: St. Sebastian oder Die schwule Kunst zu leiden, Köln 1999
- E. In het Panhuis: Anders als die Andern. Schwule und Lesben in Köln und Umgebung 1895-1918, Emons Verlag, Köln 2006, ISBN 3-89705-481-7
- E. In het Panhuis: Aufklärung und Aufregung - 50 Jahre Schwule und Lesben in der BRAVO, Archiv der Jugendkulturen Verlag KG, Berlin 2010, ISBN 978-3-940213-58-7

== See also ==
- Cologne Pride
- Timeline of LGBT history
- Schwules Museum Berlin
- IHLIA LGBT Heritagein Amsterdam, the Netherlands
