= Maxim Februari =

Dutch writer, philosopher and columnist

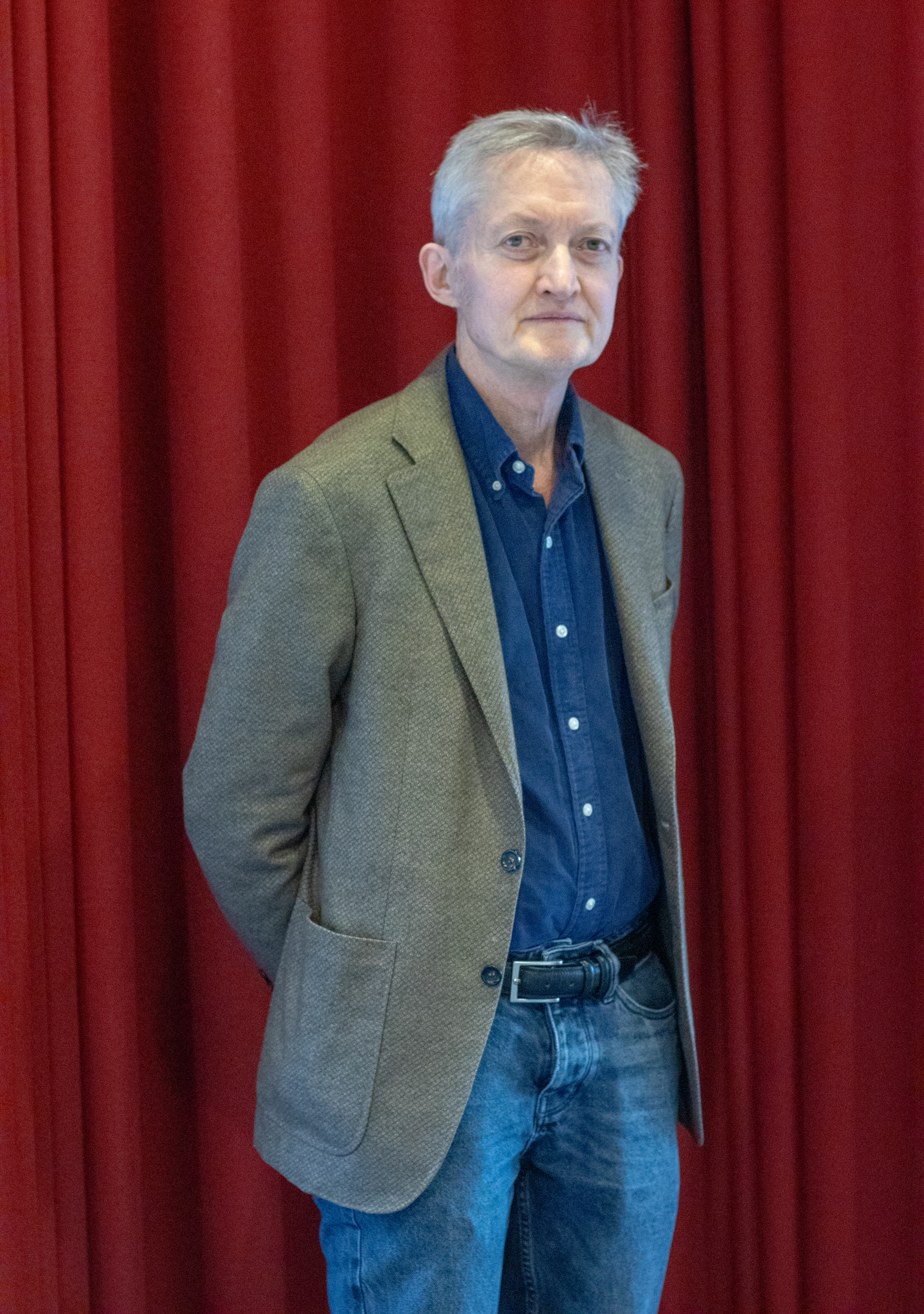
- Februari in 2025
- Born: Marjolijn Drenth; 23 February 1963 (age 63); Coevorden, Netherlands
- Education: Tilburg University (PhD)
- Occupations: Philosopher, writer
- Writing career
- Pen name: M. Februari, Marjolijn Februari and M. Drenth von Februar
- Website: Personal website

Maxim Februari, pseudonym of Maximiliaan (Max) Drenth (born 23 February 1963), is a Dutch writer, philosopher and columnist.

== Life and work ==
Februari studied law, philosophy and history of art at Utrecht University. His first novel (De zonen van het uitzicht), for which he received the Multatuli Prize, was published in 1989. Februari's next novel The Book Club (Dutch: De literaire kring) was published in 2007. He wrote columns for two leading Dutch newspapers, de Volkskrant and NRC Handelsblad. Februari published a highly original dissertation at Tilburg University in 2000. This book (Een pruik van paardenhaar & Over het lezen van een boek, Amartya Sen en de Onmogelijkheid van de Paretiaanse liberaal) was a combination of a scientific book and a novel, both on economics and on ethics –and published under two names: M. Februari & Marjolijn Drenth. In 2008 Februari received the Frans Kellendonk Prize, a Dutch literary award. Februari gave the 2011 Mosse Lecture, titled Wat is seks eigenlijk? (What exactly is sex?).

== Gender transitioning ==
Newspaper NRC-Handelsblad announced in September 2012 that their columnist Marjolijn Februari would from then on publish under the name Maxim Februari, because of his gender transitioning. Februari published The Making of a Man. Notes on Transsexuality (Dutch: De maakbare man. Notities over transseksualiteit) in 2013.

== Publications in English ==
- Maxim Februari: The Making of a Man. Notes on Transsexuality. (Transl. by Andy Brown). London, Reaktion Books, 2015. ISBN 978-1-78023-473-1
- Marjolijn Februari: The Book Club. (Transl. by Paul Vincent). London, Quercus, 2011. ISBN 978-0-85738-132-3
- Globalisation and Human Dignity. Sources and Challenges in Catholic Social Thought. An essay by Marjolijn Drenth von Februar, with contrib. by Wim van de Donk [and others]. Budel, Damon, 2004. ISBN 90-5573-577-9
