= Mohammed Benzakour =

Dutch politician

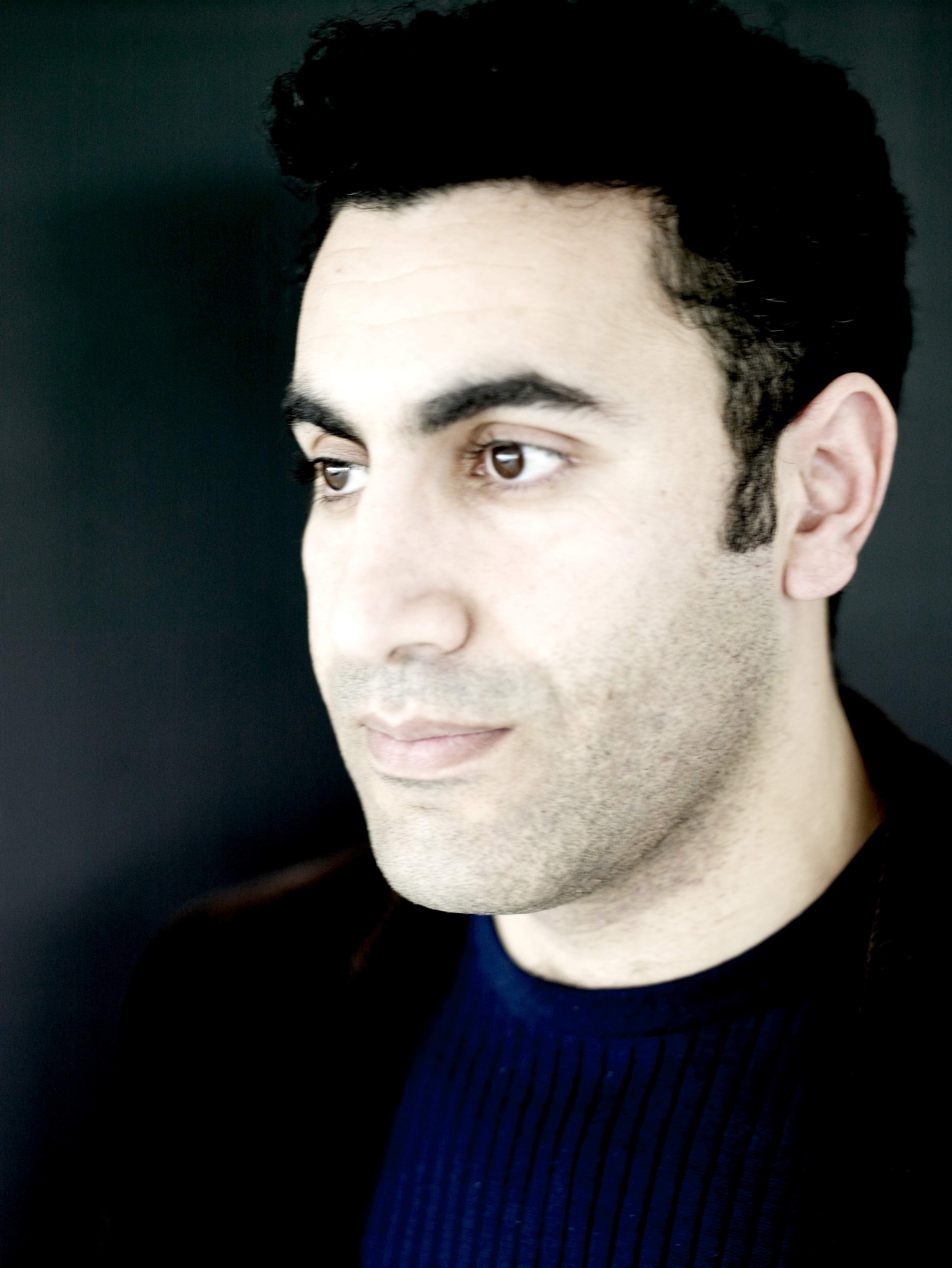
- Born: 10 January 1972 (age 54); Nador, Morocco
- Occupations: Columnist; essayist; poet; writer

Mohammed Benzakour (born 10 January 1972 in Nador, Morocco) is a Moroccan-Dutch columnist, essayist, poet, writer and politician. He is the third child in a family of five. At age three, he and mother and siblings settle in Zwijndrecht, Netherlands, where his father worked. He graduated from high school at vwo level and studied sociology at Leiden University and later political science and moved to Rotterdam to finish his master. Meanwhile, he joined the Labour Party. He started his journalism career working for De Volkskrant and also published in NRC Handelsblad, De Groene Amsterdammer and Vrij Nederland. He received the ASN Media Prize in 1999 and the Silver Zebra in 2001 for insights in a 'society in motion'. He later published two books, Abou Jahjah: Nieuwlichter of Oplichter. De demonisering van een politiek rebel in 2004 and Osama's Grot, Allah, Holland en ik, a compilation of his columns, articles and essays from 2001 until 2005, the year of publication. In that same year he also won the Peace Prize for Journalism. In 2008 his 'Stinkende Heelmeesters' was published, a compilation of essays, reviews, columns and reports from 2001 to 2008.

In March 2014 he won the 2013 E. Du Perronprijs with his non-fictional novel Yemma, about his mother. The jury writes. "His observations and feelings that come to him are both socially and general and personal and intimate. He makes his documentary a literary achievement of the first order." Benzakour gave the 2014 Mosse Lecture, titled HoMa: Zwierige redder in nood (HoMa: Graceful lifesaver).
