= LGBTQ history in the Netherlands =

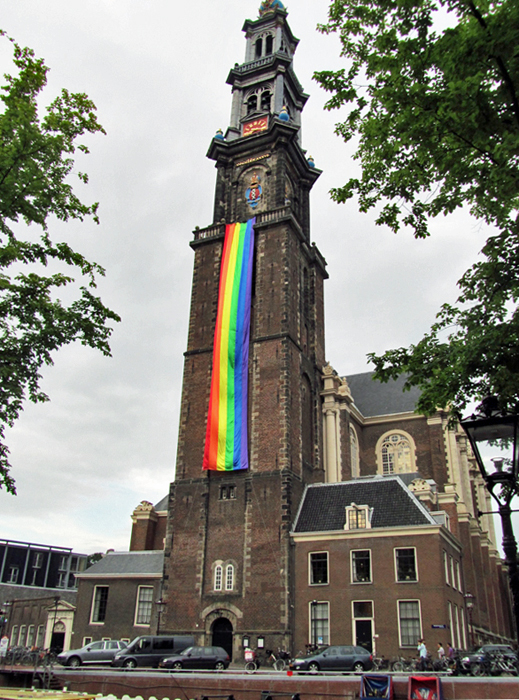
The Westertoren in Amsterdam decorated with a huge rainbow flag during the Amsterdam Gay Pride of 2012

The history of lesbian, gay, bisexual, transgender, and queer people in the Netherlands has reflected the shades of tolerance or rigidity which were utilized by the rulers of the country at various periods in its history. Since World War II, the movement for LGBT rights has been galvanized by both events abroad and increasing liberalization domestically.

== 16th Century ==
- 1520 -- Lucas van Leyden paints "Lot (biblical person) and Daughters of Lot." The Book of Genesis describes Lot's escape from the fire and brimstone of Sodom and Gomorrah for homosexuality.
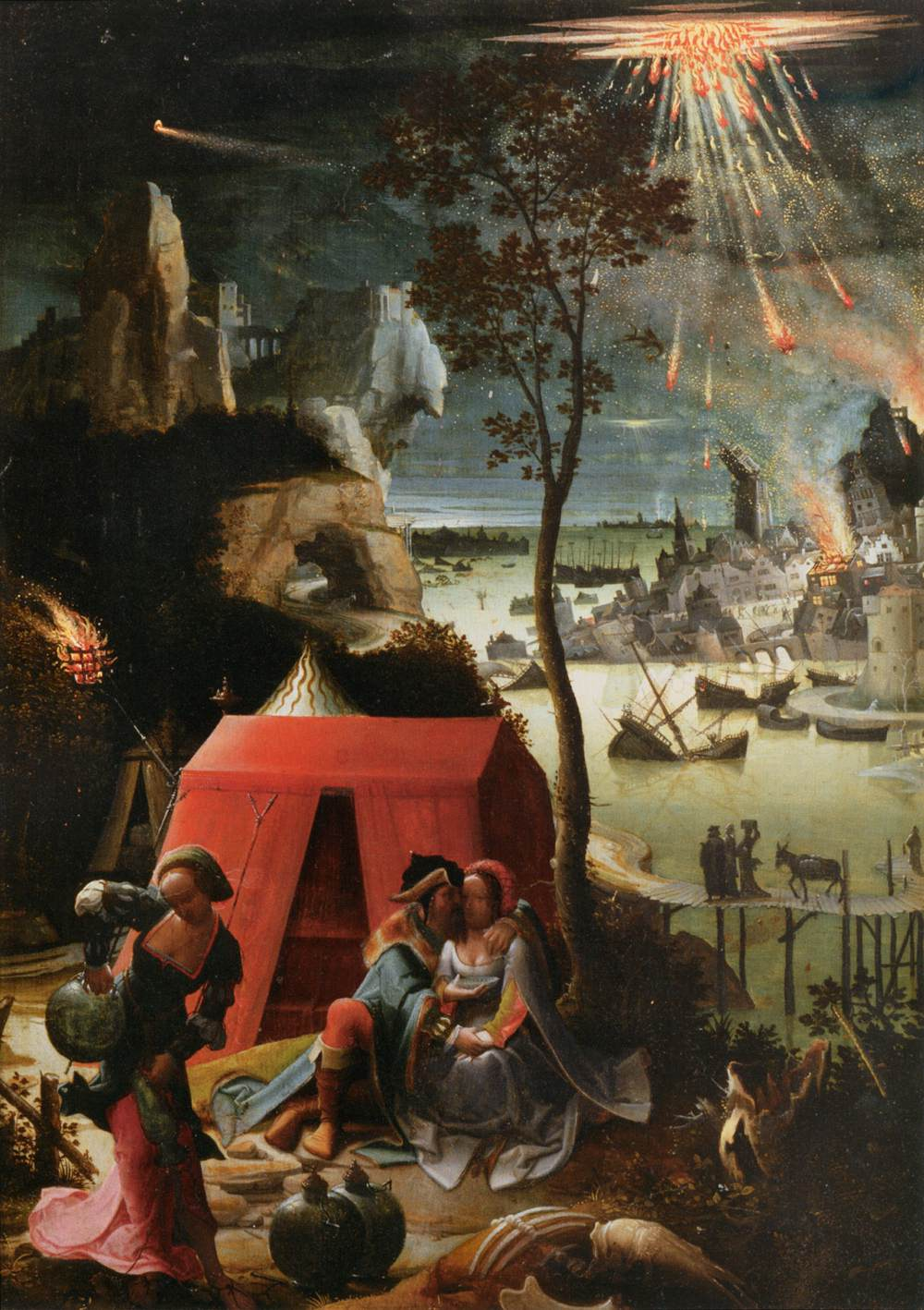
Lot and his Daughters by Lucas van Leyden

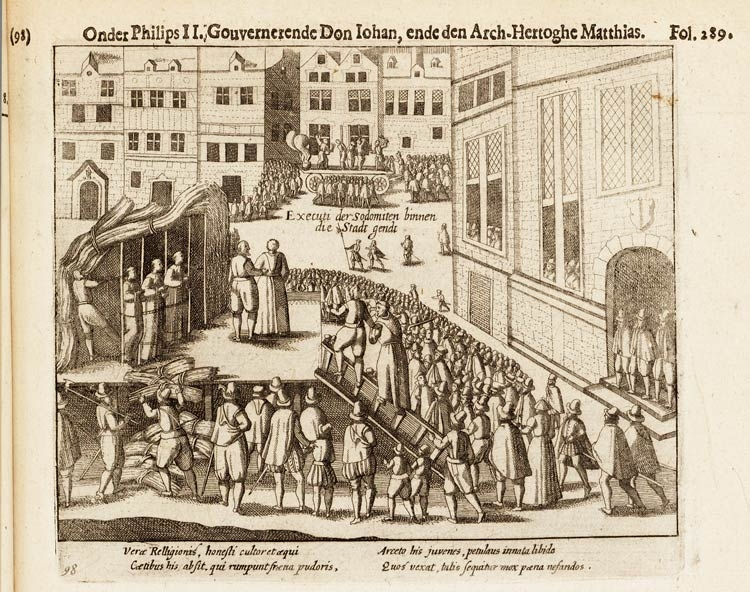
Illustration of the Execution of Homosexual Monks, 1578 by Michiel Colijn, Afbeeldinghe, ende beschrijvinghe van alle de veld-slagen, belegeringen, en̄ and're notable geschiedenissen, ghevallen in de Nederlanden, geduerende d'oorloghe teghens den coningh van Spaengien, 1616.

== 17th Century ==
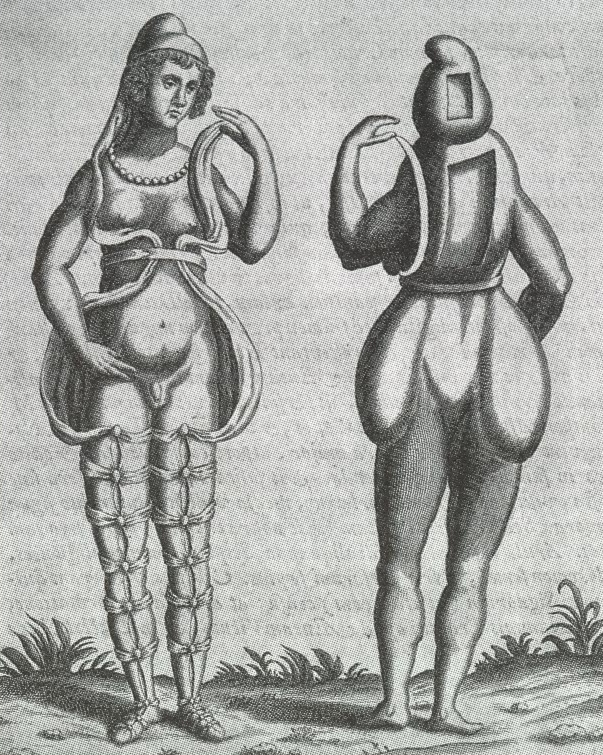
Lesbianism and hermaphroditism, depicted here in an engraving circa 1690, were very similar concepts during the Renaissance.

- 1616 -- Willem Baudartius writes and Michiel Colijn illustrates the history book: Afbeeldinghe, ende beschrijvinghe van alle de veld-slagen, belegeringen, en̄ and're notable geschiedenissen, ghevallen in de Nederlanden, geduerende d'oorloghe teghens den coningh van Spaengien . They detail the executions of monks for homosexuality in Ghent on June 28, 1578.
- 1618, two women, Magdaleene and Mayken are tried over homosexuality in Bruges. Magdeleene's husband, recently tried and condemned to death by hanging for horse thief, accused his wife of being hermaphrodite. He surprised his wife, Magdaleene, in the stable with another woman. Some days later, Magdaleene and the lady are observed running naked in crop fields up to a local lake. The women escape a few days later. Neighbors testify and confirm the sulfurous reputation and behavior of Magdaleene. Textual analysis of the trial's interrogation shows how the judges read the behavior of Magdaleene as man-like, driven, upon passive female victims, seduced while cheated, forced. Historians should be cautious when reading such statements which may reflect more the vision of the judges than actual behaviors. Magdaleene testified that her attraction for women appeared when she was 9 and saw two women having an affair. She married but her husband and her aren't promiscuous, she seduces only women and has affairs with them. Magdaleene prefers being physical with women rather than men, and without citing names, state that many women are like her. Mayken states that the sex drive of Magdaleene is overwhelming, to which Magdaleene comment that Lyve was fine with it and would have been a better partner to escape with. After the trial, Mayken is condemned to pray over her sin, and exiled from Bruges. Magdaleene is exiled from the county of Flanders and would face execution if she came back.

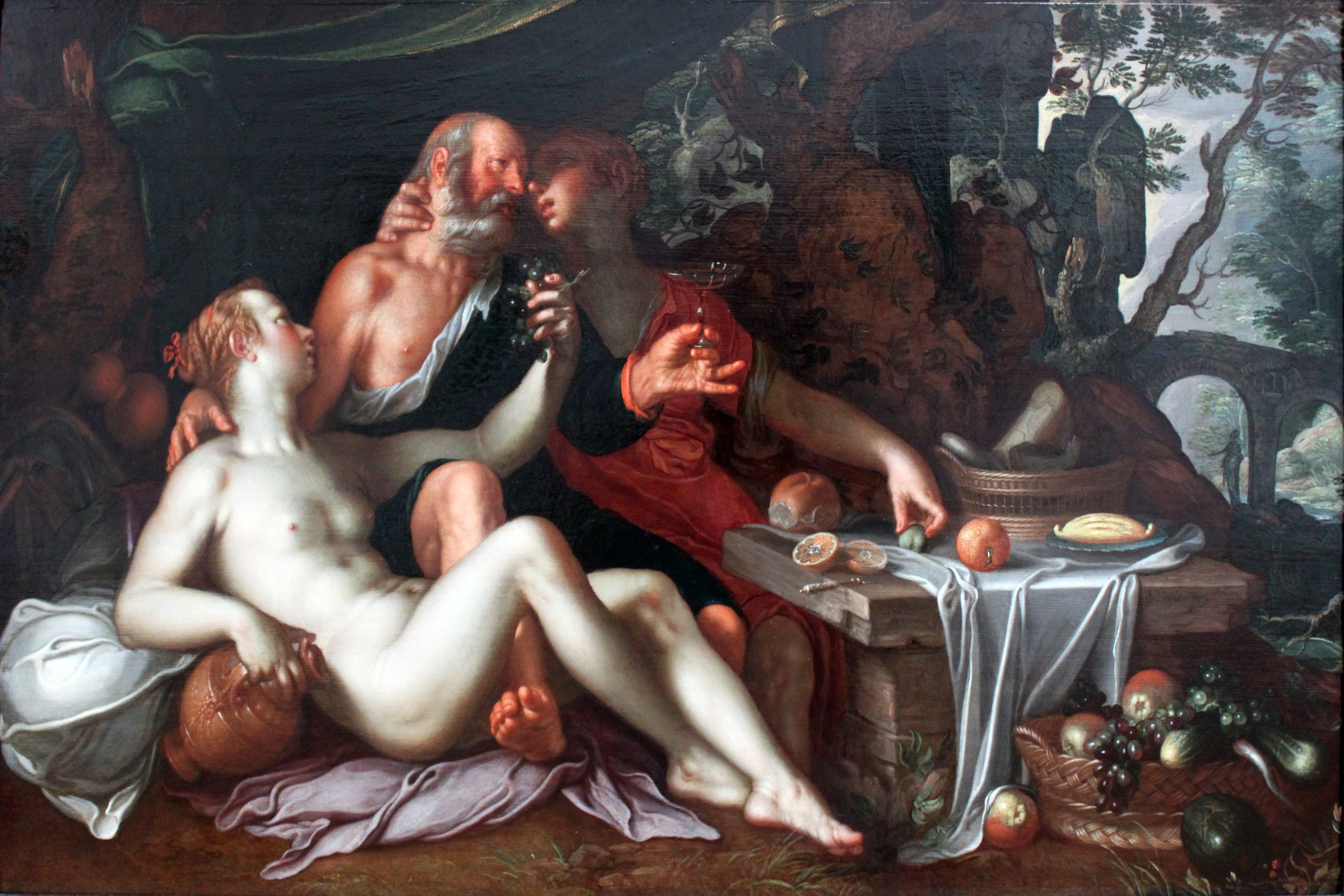
Lot (biblical person) and Lot's daughters, Joachim Wtewael

- 1630 Joachim Wtewael paints Lot and his Daughters after the Book of Genesis 18 and 19 that describes the fire and brimstone against Sodom and Gomorrah as punishment for homosexuality.

== 18th and 19th centuries ==
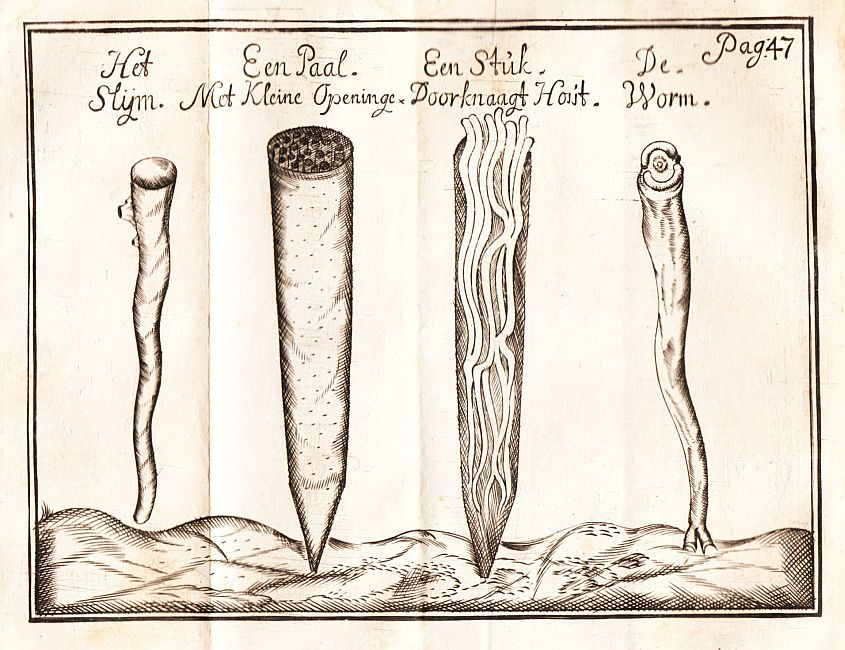
18th-century image of shipworm from a pamphlet of a Dutch Christian minister, who thought the shipworm was God's revenge because of the rise of "sodomites" in the Netherlands.

Engaging in sodomy was a public offence in the Dutch Republic from 1730 until 1811, when the Napoleonic Code which decriminalised homosexuality was first put into place, following French annexation. Most of the cases prosecuted involved men engaging in anal intercourse with other men (usually boys under the age of consent or cases of male rape). Heterosexuals who engaged in sodomy, or zoophiles engaging in bestiality, were generally not prosecuted under this legislation. However, a woman attempting a marriage with another woman could be arrested for fraud.

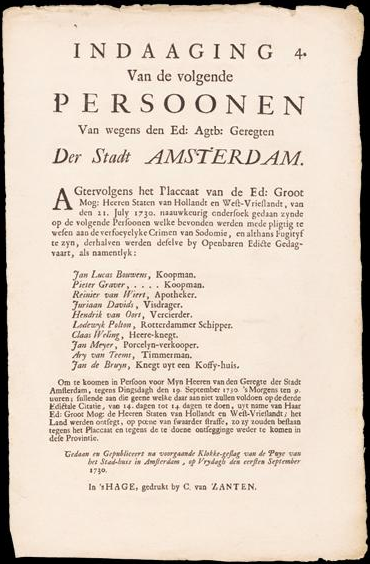
A wanted poster, published in Amsterdam on September 1, 1730

In 1725, a young Dutch sailor, Leendert Hasenbosch, was deliberately marooned alone on Ascension Island as a punishment for sodomy; he is presumed to have died of thirst. His story is known because his diary was found on the island in the following year by visiting British sailors, and published in England.

After 1730 (during the Age of Enlightenment), a steep increase regarding arrests and pogroms for sodomy occurred in the Utrecht sodomy trials. Hundreds of men were accused of sodomy with other males, and 200 to 300 men were executed during this period. Sodomy laws were also being debated in this period; in 1777, an anonymous tract titled Considerations on Punishing a Certain Infamous Crime appeared, which called for the abolition of Dutch sodomy laws. Although this tract did not view homosexuality as a crime, it did view it as asocial behaviour. It stated that homosexuality was preventable by the co-education of males and females in school, as well as promoting heterosexual marriage to young children.

In the eighteenth century, sexual vices such as masturbation came under attack, but at the same time many authors celebrated Socrates and Plato's perceived paederastic friendship. They engaged in what has been called "The Socratic Battle", which discussed whether Socrates was an ancient Greek paederast or a close friend of Plato. Both sides of the debate were clear to emphasise that they were not supportive of sodomy or paederasty per se, but that they were supportive of the same-sex friendship, being purposefully vague as to the dynamics of the latter so as not to offend the sensitivities of the age. Same-sex attractions were still perceived as a sin and often kept quiet, and it has been argued that this silence both prevented and ironically encouraged homosexuality in males.

While sodomy laws were most often used to prosecute men, some women were subject to punishment by law after being discovered to be in same-sex relationships. Historian Theo van der Meer writes, "The average penalty imposed on these women was six years' confinement, as compared to twelve for men." These women who engaged in same-sex relationships and sometimes dressed like men, were classified as tribades. They were often driven to theft and sex work as a result of living in poverty.

After the Batave Republic was founded in 1795, the number of prosecutions for sodomy increased again, but the severity of the punishments lessened. Some tribades were prosecuted for attempted sodomy and were imprisoned and even executed. In 1810, the Napoleon Bonaparte incorporated the country into the French Empire. In 1811, Holland adopted the French legal code, which had abolished laws against sodomy in 1791.

== 20th century ==
=== 1900–1939 ===
In 1911 the ruling Christian-based political parties enacted "article 248bis" that raised the age of consent for homosexuality to 21, while the age of consent for heterosexuality remained at 16. Along with the unequal age of consent were various laws against "public indecency" that were often used against gay men. In response to this new law, a Dutch chapter of the German Scientific Humanitarian Committee was organized under the leadership of Jacob Schorer. The organization was made independent and named Nederlandsch Wetenschappelijk Humanitair Komitee (NWHK) in 1919.

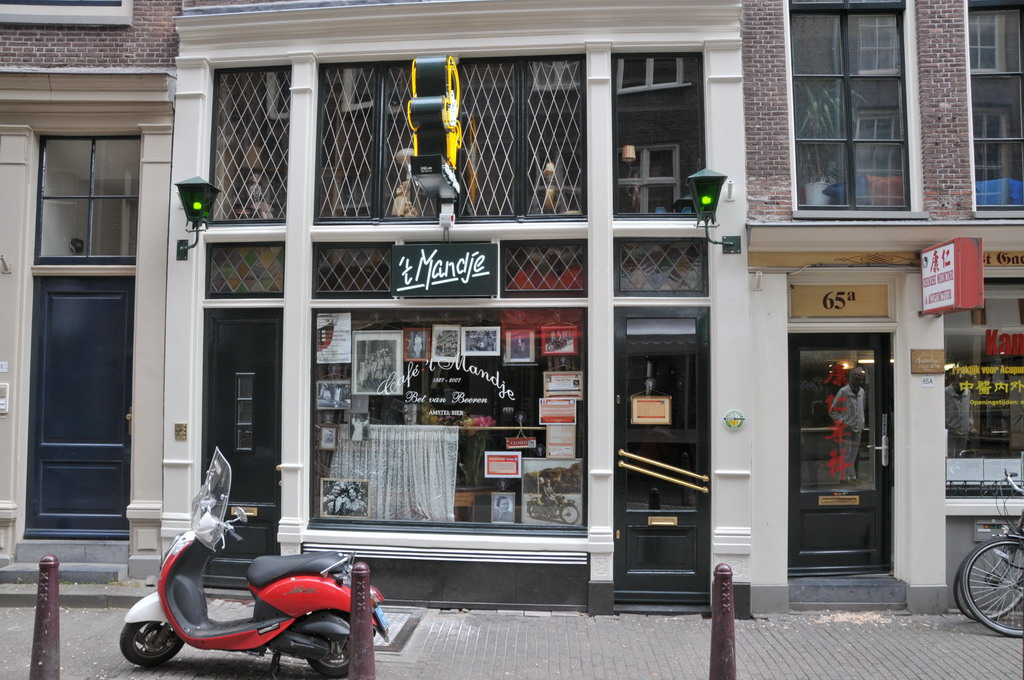
Café 't Mandje at Zeedijk in Amsterdam

In Amsterdam, the first gay bars were established during this period. The best known was The Empire, which was first mentioned in 1911 and existed until the late 1930s. From here, the first gay magazine, called Wij ("We"), was published in 1932. The oldest place that still exists is Café 't Mandje, which was opened in 1927 by lesbian Bet van Beeren. Another early gay bar was Du Merlo, which was established in 1928.

=== 1940–1969 ===
The NWHK was shut down by the German Nazis during the Second World War, and the German law that prohibited homosexuality, Paragraph 175 was introduced into Dutch law. The Dutch LGBT rights movement was revived in 1945 when the Center for Culture and Recreation, short COC, was created in The Hague by Niek Engelschman which published the magazine Levensrecht ("Right To Live").

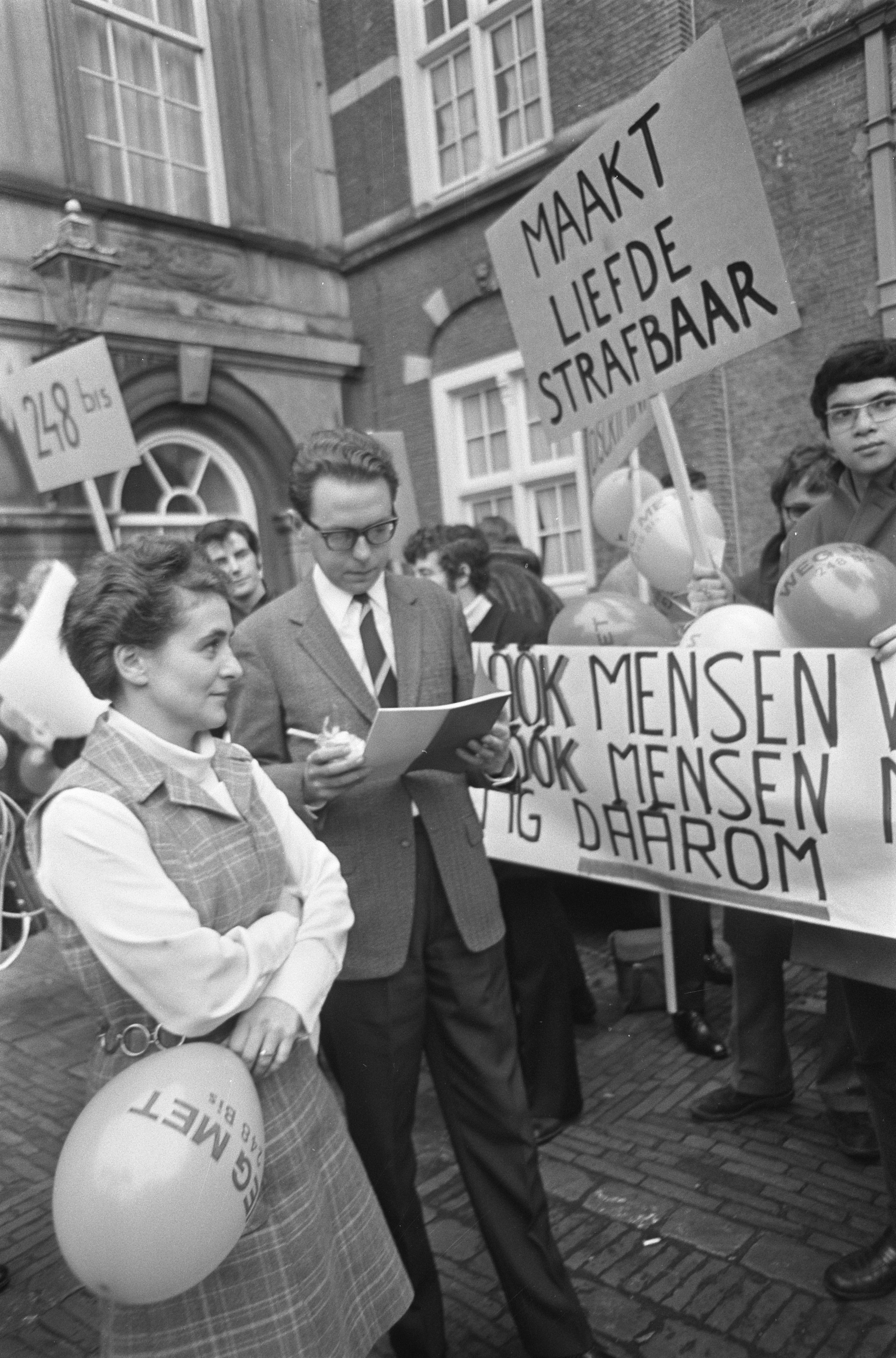
LGBT people demonstrating against art. 248bis in The Hague, 1969

In the late 1940s into the 1960s several Dutch psychiatrists and clergy began to see homosexuality as a minor mental illness. During the sexual revolution of the 1960s, this more open-minded point of view resulted in a less repressive attitude towards homosexuality and the legalization of adultery, abortion, and pornography. Prostitution was legalized in 1993.

In Amsterdam, the city government acted rather pragmatic and tolerated the existence of gay bars. In 1952 even a gay dancing hall, called D.O.K. (De Odeon Kelder), was opened, followed in 1955 by the somewhat more decent dancing hall of gay rights organisation COC, called De Schakel. They both existed for over 30 years, attracted gay men from all over the world and making Amsterdam the Gay Capital of that time.

In the 1960s, the number of gay bars grew rapidly and they clustered in and around a number of streets, although this was limited to bars, clubs and shops and they never became residential areas for gays, like the gay villages in the US. Since the late 1950s the main Amsterdam gay street was Kerkstraat. Other streets in which there came a concentration of gay bars are Zeedijk, Amstel and Warmoesstraat, the latter being the center of the Amsterdam leather scene, where the first leather bar already opened around 1955.

=== 1970–1999 ===
In 1971, Article 248bis was repealed and in 1973 Dutch mental health institutions stopped treating homosexuality as an illness and the military lifted its ban on homosexuals. More Dutch LGBT people started to "come out", gay publications such as "Gay Krant" started to be published and the liberal and left-wing Dutch political parties started to support LGBT rights as part of an overall support of social tolerance and liberalism.

In the early 1980s, Reguliersdwarsstraat succeeded Kerkstraat as the main Amsterdam gay street. In Reguliersdwarsstraat two of the first openly gay places opened: lunchroom Downtown, followed by the famous cafe April in 1981. Street parties were organized in which gay and straight people partied together and the gay scene became trendsetting for Dutch night life. Gay club iT in Amstelstraat became world-famous for its extravagant parties.

Around 1983, the AIDS pandemic reached Amsterdam too, which prompted most Dutch gay men to change their sexual habits to practice safe sex, and eventually comprehensive sexual education was introduced into the public schools that resulted in a low rate of infection.

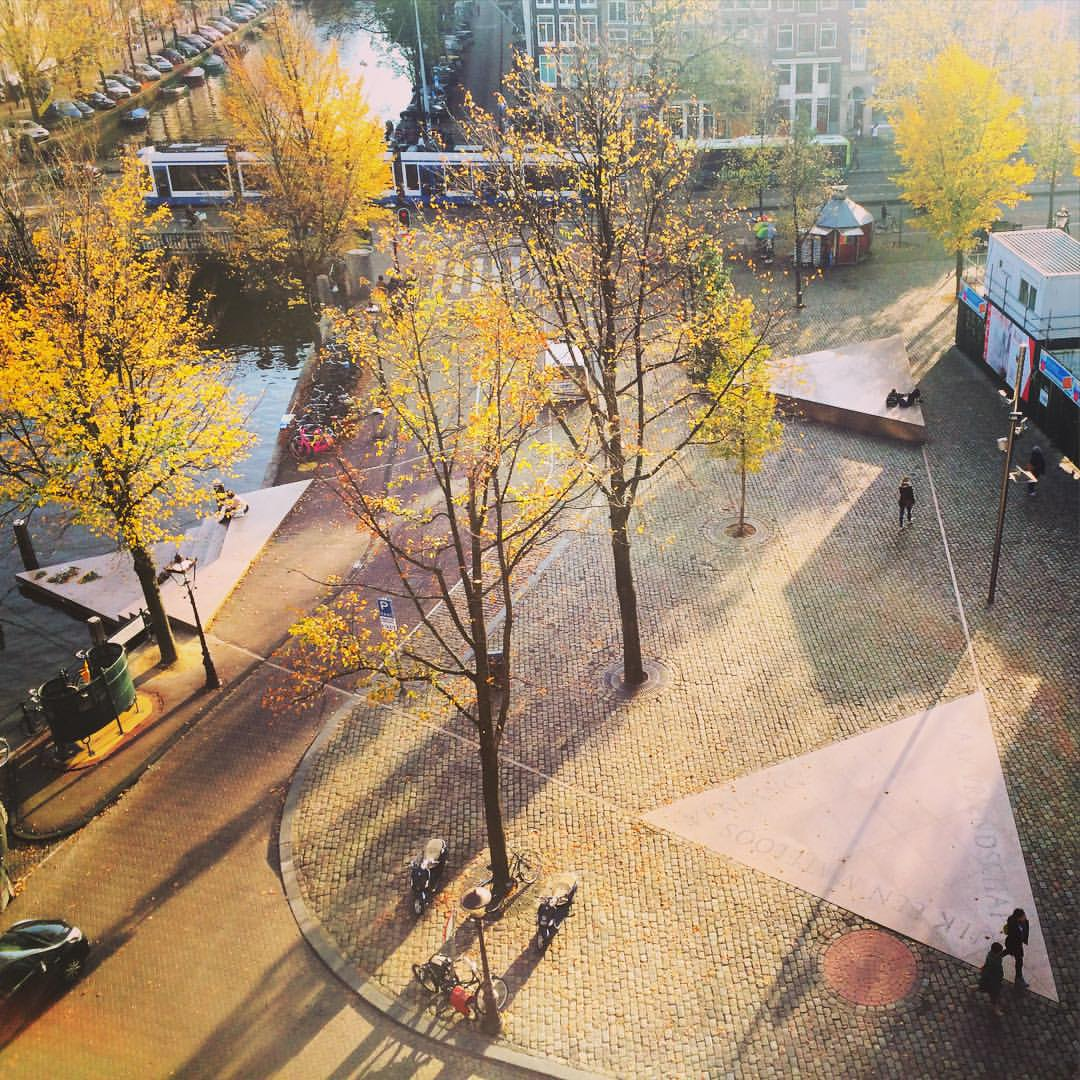
The Homomonument in Amsterdam, consisting of three pink triangles

In 1987, the world's first gay memorial in public space, the Homomonument, was opened in the centre of Amsterdam. It commemorates all gay men and lesbians who have been subjected to persecution because of their homosexuality.

In 1993 the Dutch parliament enacted the "Equal Rights Law", which included sexual orientation as a category legally protected against discrimination, for example in employment, housing, and the provision of both public and private goods and services. However, a leaked report in 2005 stated that religious schools, most of which are financed by the government, can exclude teachers if their behaviour outside of school goes against the ethos of the school, and a teacher was suspended in April 2005 solely for being in a same-sex relationship. In 1998 the Dutch parliament granted same-sex couples domestic partnership benefits.

To celebrate freedom and diversity, the Amsterdam Gay Pride was established in 1996, which became famous for the Canal Parade of boats. Two years later, this parade was the start of the 1998 edition of the Gay Games, which was the by then largest gay event ever held in the Netherlands.

== 21st century ==
=== 2000–2004 ===
In 2001 the Netherlands granted legal recognition to same-sex marriage, becoming the first nation to do so.

Isolated verbal and physical attacks on LGBT people tend to come from the socially conservative leadership of the Muslim community and their followers (more than 5% of the population). Political leaders of the conservative Christian parties (accounting for another 5%) oppose gay-rights legislation, however, they do recognise the gay community and all oppose discrimination against LGBT people. Furthermore, the ChristenUnie (ChristianUnion), who, together with the CDA and PvdA forms the fourth Balkenende cabinet, doesn't want to reverse the same-sex marriage law (while in the Balkenende IV cabinet), for they recognise it as something that has a large social basis, and thus "a given fact". ChristenUnie remains, however, against same-sex marriage. For the Netherlands, it is a conservative point of view, but compared with other Christian parties in the world, it is rather progressive.

The two autonomous overseas territories within the Kingdom of the Netherlands, Aruba and the Netherlands Antilles, reject the Netherlands' liberal legislation regarding sexual orientation, and have not legalized same-sex marriages. However, the Netherlands Supreme Court in 2007 declared that all marriages contracted in the different parts of the Kingdom of the Netherlands should be accepted in the other parts of the Kingdom as well, forcing Aruba to recognize same-sex marriages concluded in the Netherlands. This does not mean however that Aruba or the Netherlands Antilles are bound to introduce laws legalizing same-sex marriages to be concluded within their countries, since the constituent countries of the Kingdom have separate private law (see Same-sex marriage in Aruba). While homosexual relations between consenting adults in private are legal, most of the people in the island territories affiliate with the socially conservative Roman Catholic Church. As a result, many Antillians and Arubans do not support LGBT rights.

In 2002 the Dutch Red Cross Society started to participate in the annual gay pride festival to promote AIDS-HIV education.

=== 2005–2009 ===
In 2005 American journalist Chris Crain and his boyfriend were the victims of a gay-bashing while in the Netherlands by two men described as having "Moroccan features".

In 2005 the Dutch government started allowing married same-sex couples to adopt children from overseas.

In 2005 Aruba, a constituent country of the Kingdom of the Netherlands, refused to recognize same-sex marriages, although it has legalized homosexual relations between consenting adults in private. In 2007, the Dutch Supreme Court declared that all marriages contracted in the different parts of the Kingdom of the Netherlands should be accepted in the other parts of the Kingdom as well, forcing Aruba to recognize same-sex marriages.

In 2006 the Dutch government acted to deport several Iranian LGBT immigrants who claimed that they would be killed if they were sent back, but after protests from the Dutch population, the government let them stay.

A 2006 European Union member poll showed the Dutch to be the strongest supporters of same-sex marriage at 82%.

In 2007 the Dutch Equal Treatment commission confirmed the policy of Sanquin (the Dutch organization that regulates blood donation) not to allow MSMs (Men who have Sex with Men) to donate blood. It had previously done so in 1998.

=== 2010–2014 ===
In 2010 a Catholic priest in Reusel denied the openly gay Prince Carnaval the sacramental bread. The gay community turned out in large number during the subsequent mass, leading the preacher to cancel the Eucharist. The bishop of 's-Hertogenbosch backed the priest, after which the gay community, backed by the chair of political party PvdA (English: Labour Party), announced a protest at the bishop's mass. While much of the Dutch discourse about acceptance of homosexuality within religion was focused on the lack of acceptance in Islam, this case showed that the acceptance of homosexuality in some Christian churches remains low as well in the Netherlands.

=== 2020s ===
The country appointed its first openly gay prime minister, Rob Jetten, in February 2026 following the 2025 Dutch general election.

== See also ==
- LGBT rights in the Netherlands
