= Bas Heijne =

Dutch writer (born 1960)

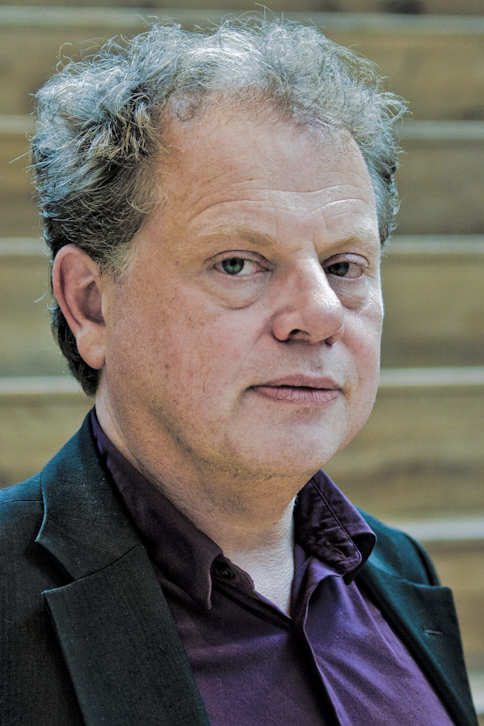
- Bas Heijne in 2011
- Born: Bastiaan Johan Heijne; 9 January 1960 (age 66); Nijmegen, Netherlands
- Occupations: Writer, translator
- Writing career
- Language: Dutch
- Years active: 1983–present
- Notable awards: Henriette Roland Holst Prize (2005), J. Greshoff Prize (2014) and P. C. Hooft Award (2017)

Bastiaan Johan "Bas" Heijne (Note: The phrase Bastiaan Johan "Bas" Heijne is pronounced [ˈbɑstijaː ˈɲoːɦɑm bɑs ˈɦɛinə]. The words in isolation are pronounced [ˈbɑstijaːn], [ˈjoːɦɑn], [bɑs] and [ˈɦɛinə].) (born 9 January 1960) is a Dutch writer and translator.

== Early life and education ==
Bastiaan Johan Heijne was born in Nijmegen in the Netherlands on 9 January 1960. He studied English language and literature at the University of Amsterdam.

== Career ==
Heijne published in De Tijd, NRC Handelsblad, HP, De Groene Amsterdammer, and Vrij Nederland. Since 1991, he works for NRC Handelsblad. He translated works by E. M. Forster and Evelyn Waugh, and his own writings had features of their decadent style. Heijne gave the 2005 Mosse Lecture, titled De eeuwige homo (The eternal gay).

Heijne was awarded the Henriette Roland Holst Prize (named after the Dutch poet Henriette Roland Holst) for the book Hollandse toestanden ("Dutch affairs") (2005), a collection of his columns from NRC Handelsblad. In 2014, he won the J. Greshoff Prize (named after the Dutch journalist, poet and literary critic Jan Greshoff) for his essay Angst en schoonheid ("Fear and beauty"), on the Dutch writer Louis Couperus. In 2017, he has received the P. C. Hooft Award for his non-fiction oeuvre.

== Bibliography ==
- (1983) Laatste woorden (Last words)
- (1987) Vreemde reis (Strange journey)
- (1989) Heilige monsters (Holy monsters)
- (1992) Suez
- (1994) Vlees en bloed (Flesh and blood)
- (1996) Het gezicht van Louis Couperus (The face of Louis Couperus)
- (1999) De mens is zo'n breekbaar wezen (Man is such a fragile creature)
- (2000) De wijde wereld (The wide world)
- (2003) Van Gogh
- (2003) Het verloren land (The lost country)
- (2004) Tafelgesprekken (Table conversations)
- (2004) De werkelijkheid (The reality)
- (2005) Hollandse toestanden (Dutch affairs)
- (2006) Zang (Singing)
- (2006) Grote vragen (Big questions)
- (2007) Onredelijkheid (Unreasonableness)
- (2010) Harde liefde (Tough love)
- (2011) Moeten wij van elkaar houden? (Do we have to love one another?)
- (2011) Echt zien (Really seeing)
- (2013) Angst en schoonheid (Fear and beauty)
- (2016) Onbehagen (Discontent)
- (2017) Staat van Nederland, een pleidooi (State of the Netherlands, a plea)
