= IHLIA LGBTI Heritage =

Archive in the Netherlands

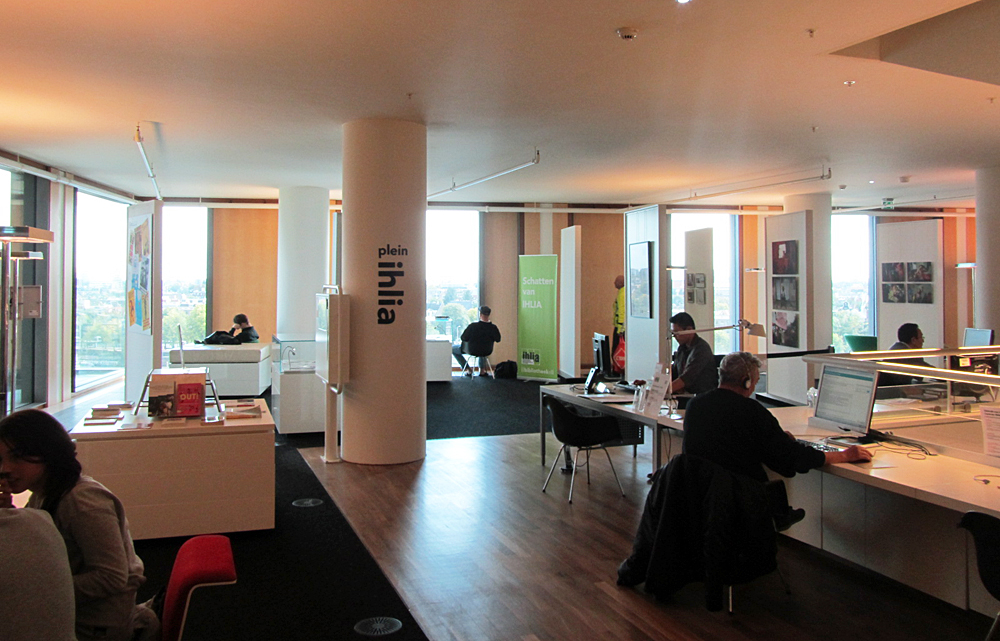
- IHLIA's reading room on the 3rd floor of the Public Library at Amsterdam, the Netherlands
- Location: Amsterdam, Netherlands
- Established: 1999; 27 years ago

Collection
- Size: Over 100,000 titles, including books, journals, films, posters, objects and archives from individuals and organisations

Other information
- Director: Lonneke van den Hoonaard
- Website: ihlia.nl

IHLIA LGBTI Heritage, formerly known as the International Gay/Lesbian Information Center and Archive (Dutch: Internationaal Homo/Lesbisch Informatiecentrum en Archief; IHLIA), is an international archive and documentation center on homosexuality, bisexuality and transgender.

It collects, preserves and presents to the public all kinds of information in the field of LGBTI. IHLIA curates the largest LGBTI collection of Europe with over 100,000 titles on 1515 meters of shelf length – books, journals and magazines, films, documentaries, posters, photographs and objects such as T-shirts, buttons and condom packaging.

== History ==
IHLIA was founded in 1999 by merging the Homodok (documentation on homosexuality of the University of Amsterdam), the Lesbian Archives of Leeuwarden hosted at the Anna Blamanhuis, and Lesbisch Archief Amsterdam (LAA). Since 2007, IHLIA has been located in the Public Library Amsterdam. IHLIA and the George Mosse Fund organize the annual Mosse Lectures. Over 95% of their annual budget, about 800,000 euros, comes from the national government.

IHLIA has part-time staff and volunteers who help in their work. They provide access to archival materials on request, for instance to students of Gender Studies at the University of Amsterdam.

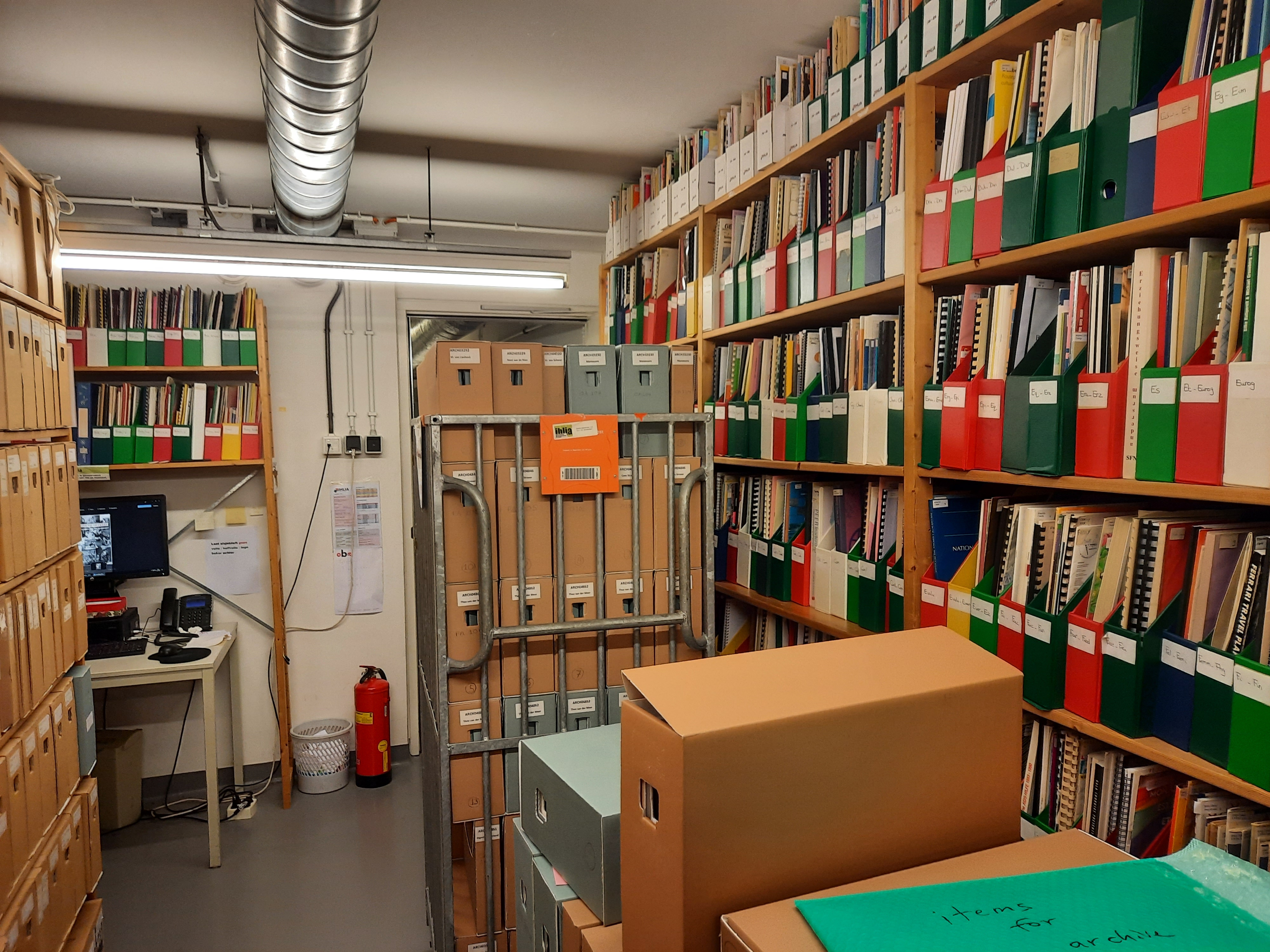
The archives are kept in the basement of the Public Library

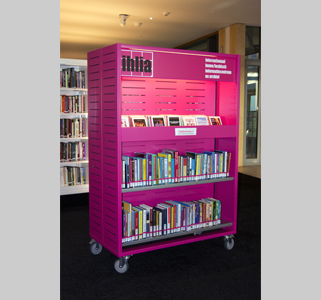
Special pink bookcase on the 3rd floor of the library

Der Eigene. Ein Blatt für Alle und Keinen (Your own. A magazine for everyone and no one), 1896 Berlin-Wilhelmshagen. First homosexual magazine. Full text. Collection IHLIA LGBTI Heritage.

== See also ==
- Centrum Schwule Geschichte (Cologne)
- GLBT Historical Society (San Francisco)
- ONE National Gay & Lesbian Archives (Los Angeles)
- Schwules Museum (Berlin)
- Tucson LGBTQ Museum (Tucson)
