= Pride Amsterdam =

Annual LGBT event in Amsterdam

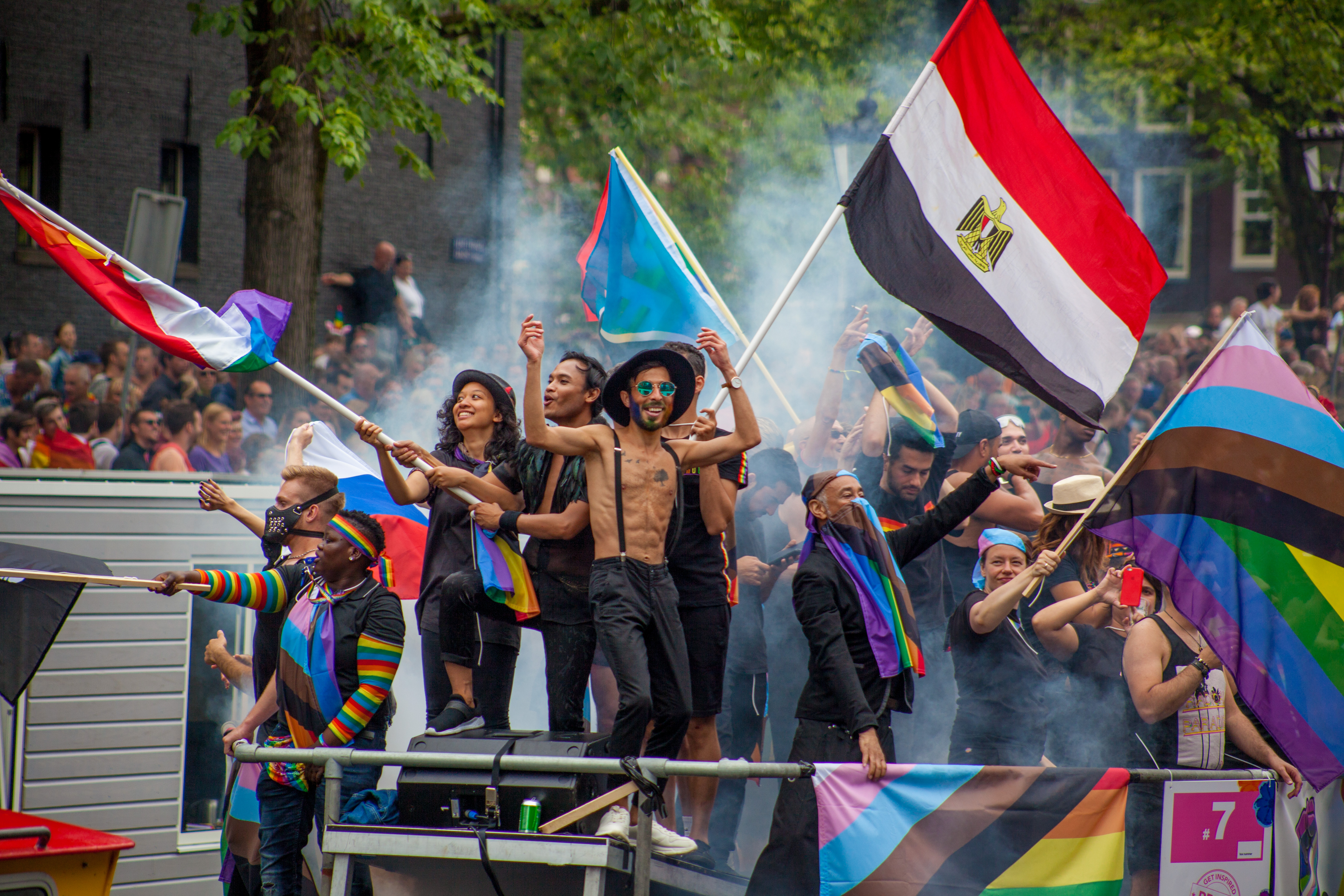
Amsterdam Canal Parade (2019)

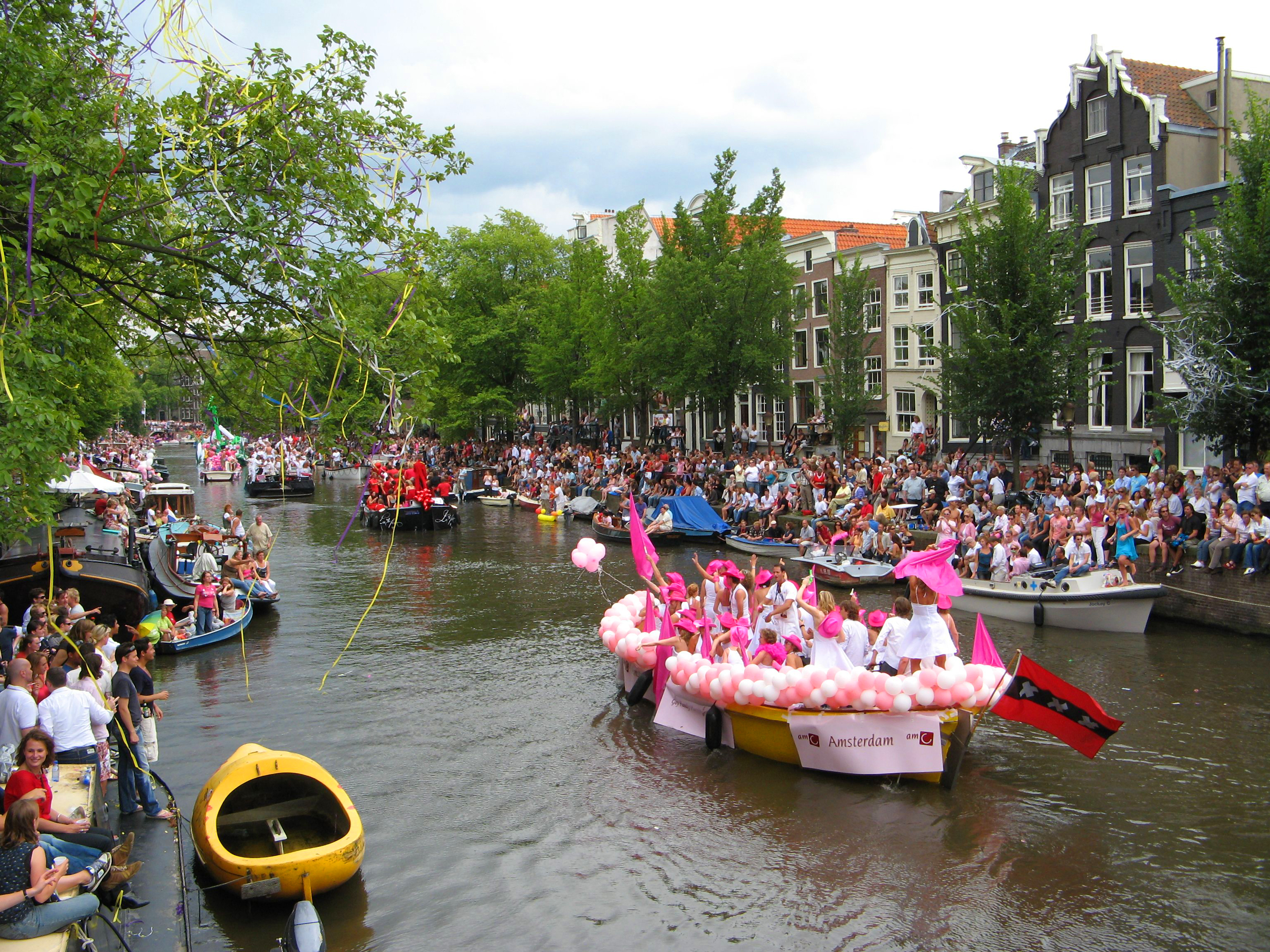
Amsterdam Gay Pride in 2008.

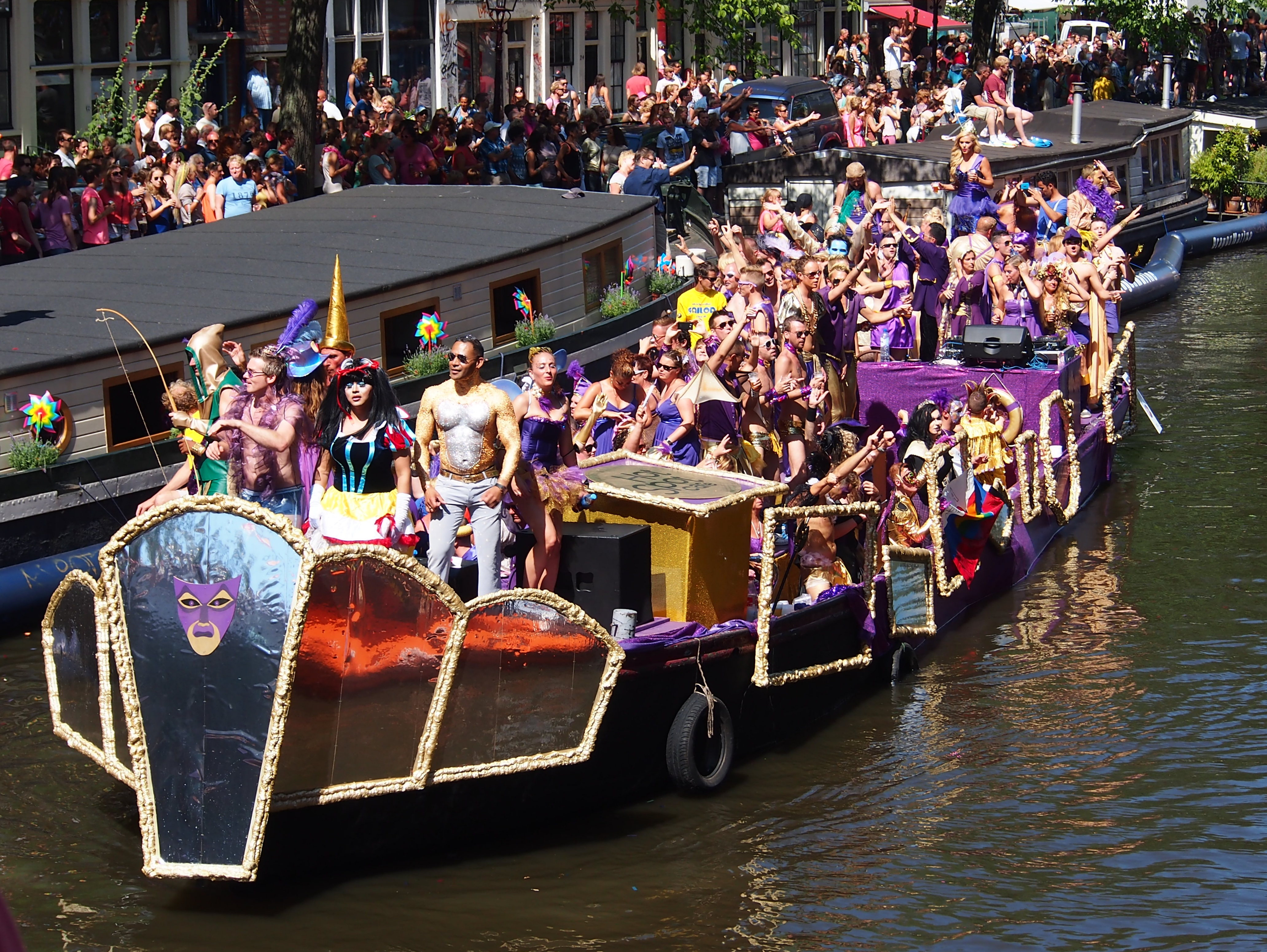
One of the decorated boats participating in the 2013 Canal Parade of the Amsterdam Gay Pride.

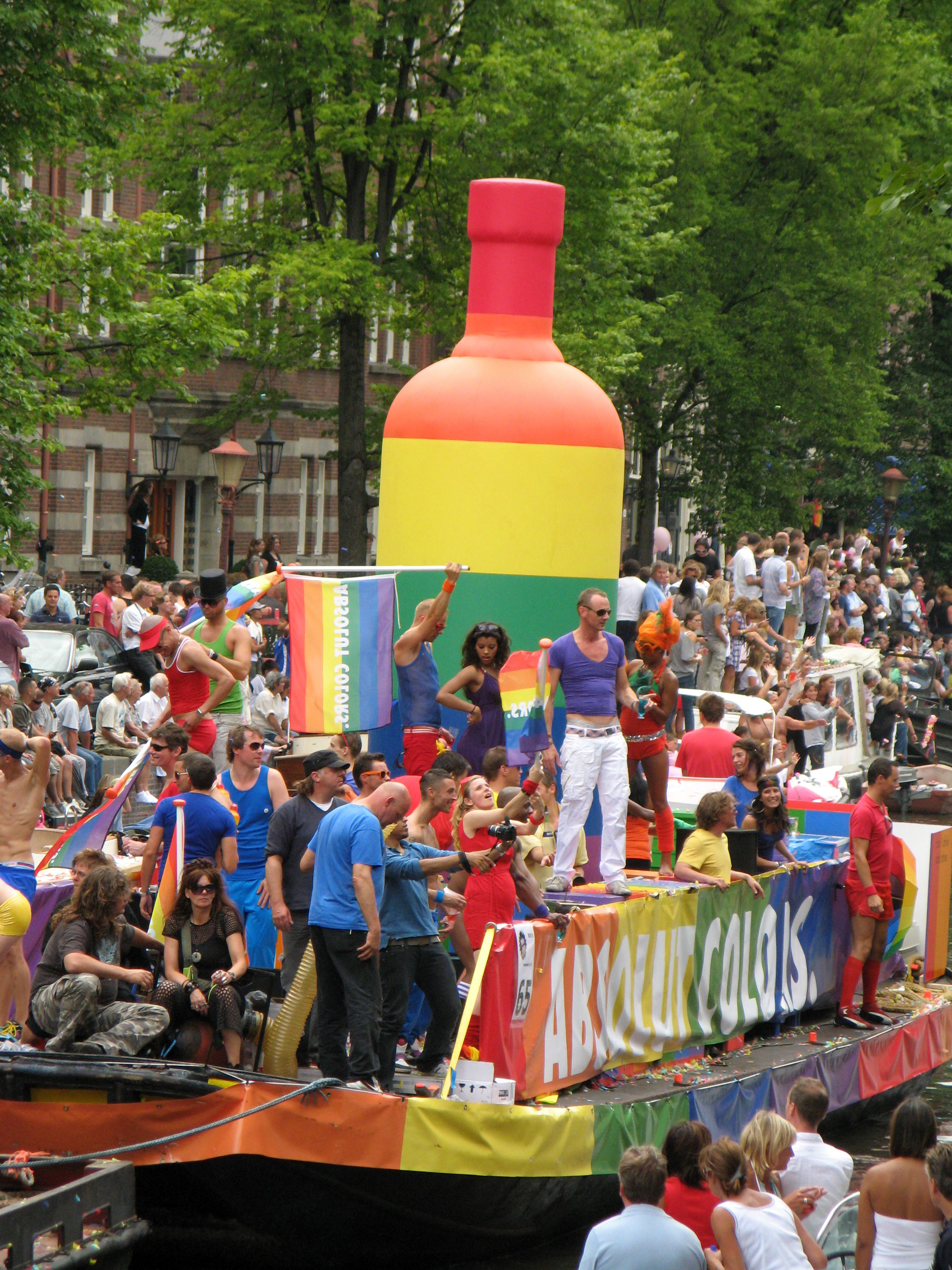
Amsterdam Gay Pride 2008

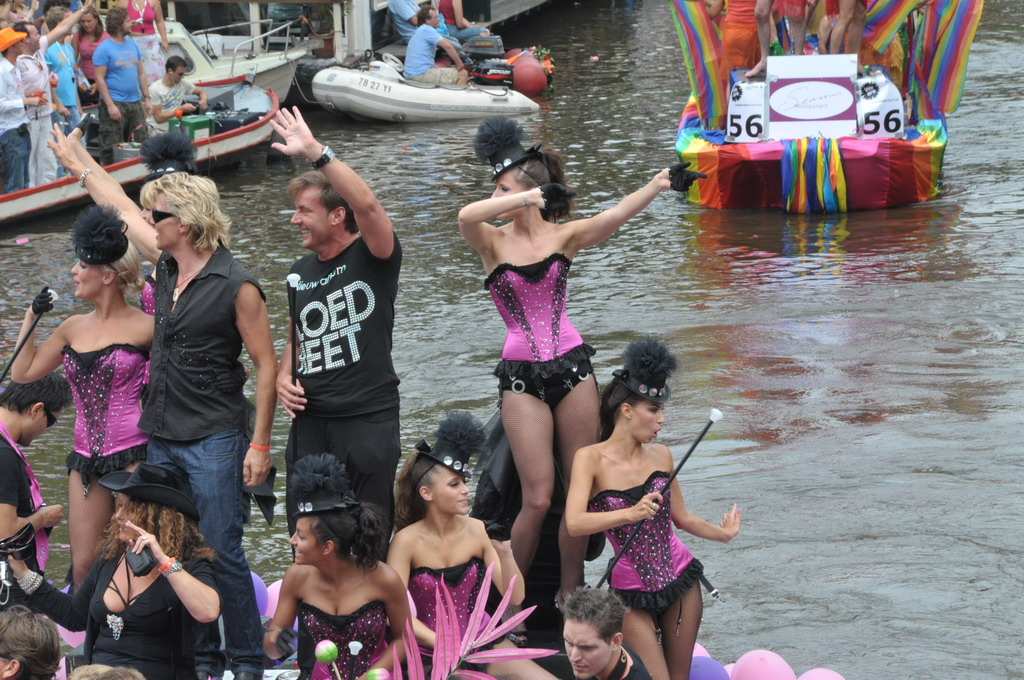
Hans Klok and Gerard Joling on a parade boat.

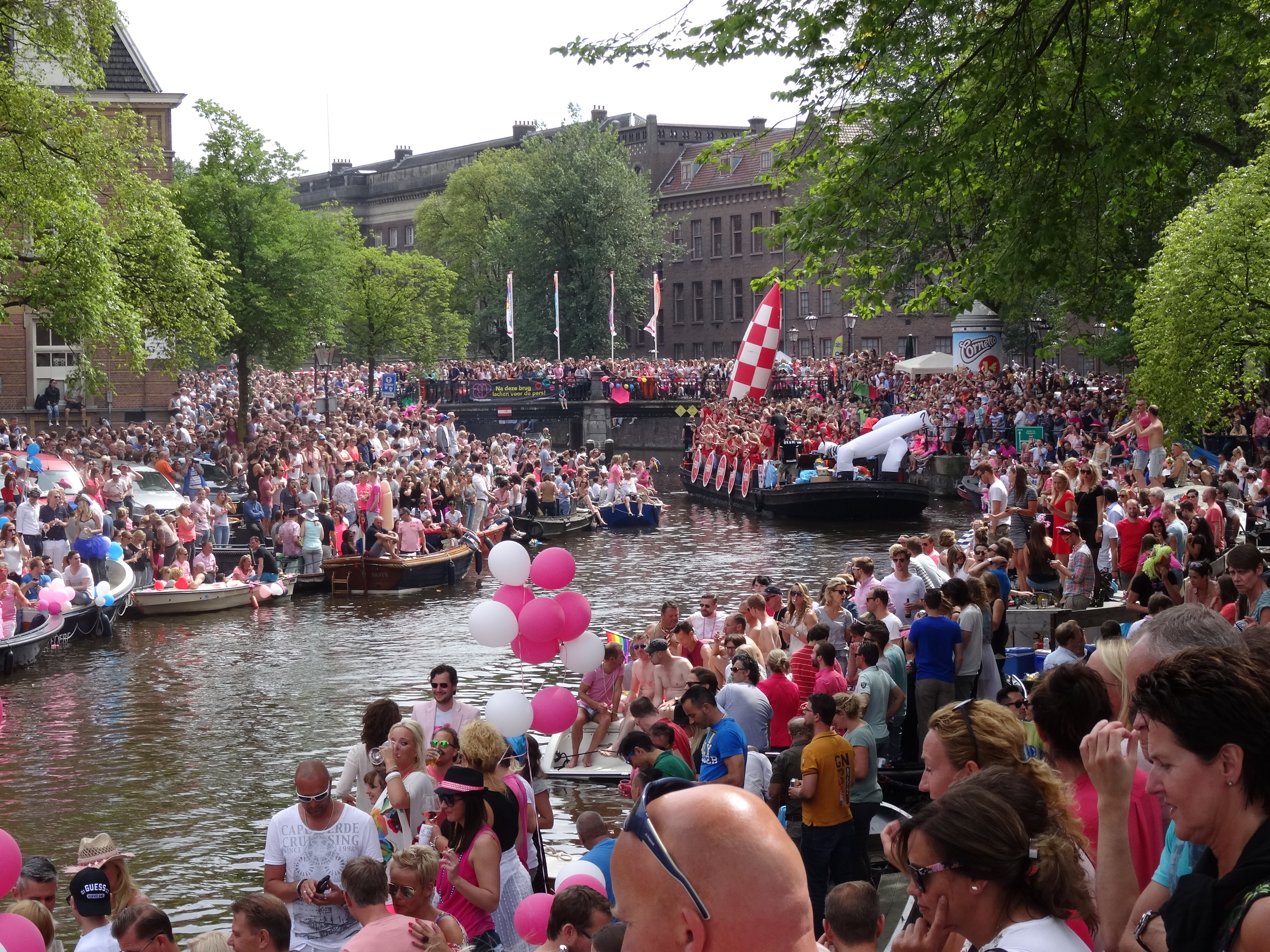
This image shows a large number of individuals that attend the festival.

Pride Amsterdam or Amsterdam Pride, also formerly known as the Amsterdam Gay Pride, is a citywide queer-festival held annually at the center of Amsterdam, Netherlands during the first weekend of August. The festival attracts several hundred-thousand visitors each year and is one of the largest publicly held annual events in the country.

Pride Amsterdam was first organized in 1996, meant as a festival to celebrate freedom and diversity. It was therefore not like many other Gay Prides, which began as demonstrations for equal rights. The latter purpose served another event, which is called Pink Saturday (Dutch: Roze Zaterdag) since 1979 and is held in a different city each year since 1981.

The peak of the festival is during the Canal Parade, a parade of boats of large variety on the first Saturday of August, which usually goes from Westerdok over the Prinsengracht, the Amstel river, the Zwanenburgwal and the Oudeschans to Oosterdok. In 2014, the first Jewish boat and the first Moroccan boat participated in the Pride Amsterdam Canal Parade. Dana International was on the Jewish boat, as well as the Fokkens twins (Louise Fokkens and Martine Fokkens), who are famous in the Netherlands for having worked 50 years as sex workers in Amsterdam's Red Light District before their retirement earlier in 2014. Marianne van Praag, a Reform rabbi from The Hague, was the only rabbi aboard the Jewish boat.

Pride Amsterdam usually spans a week of various activities for lesbian, gay, bisexual and transgender (LGBT) people, including exhibitions, cultural and sport events. There are also street parties in the streets where there's a concentration of gay bars, like Reguliersdwarsstraat, Zeedijk, Warmoesstraat and alongside Amstel. On Rembrandtplein there's a closing party on the Sunday after the Canal Parade. There are lots of other festivities in the city, like Queer Arts Festival, Ink Goes Pink, Milkshake Festival, The Kiki Kiki Ball, Drag Queen Karaoke and more.

== Name change to Pride Amsterdam ==
In 2015, the board of the then named Amsterdam Gay Pride took a different approach towards the name of the festival. The ProGay foundation, which founded the festival, argued that the term 'Gay' did not sufficiently express the diversity amongst the participants of the Pride. The president of the board, Irene Hemelaar, confirmed that the change would be happening, but the name change only came through in 2017. By changing the name of the festival they hoped to encourage other prides to become more inclusive in their annual events.

In 2016, the EuroPride changed its community name to LGBTI, I for intersex, since it was the first year in which there was an appearance of an intersexual community in the festival's program. Since the Netherlands have learned about the intersexual community, digesting and learning their culture has been their top priority. The name change and the appearance of the 'I' in LGBTI worked to form a more inclusive environment for all people to celebrate their gender and sexuality.

== LGBT in Netherlands ==
The Netherlands shows a very high level of social acceptance to the LGBT community. Through the years, social acceptance towards LGBT groups has been increasing, and the Netherlands received top rankings in several surveys into the attitude towards LGBT groups, relative to a number of other high ranking European countries such as Spain and the United Kingdom. In 2001, it became the first country in the world to legalise same-sex marriage. The tolerant attitude of different groups of Dutch people can be seen in some aspects of how the public view LGBT people, acceptance of equal rights for LGBT people, the visibility of the LGBT community and construction of networks of LGBT groups. For example, the Netherlands has the highest ranking in support for LGBT groups having the freedom to pursue their desired lifestyles, and feel most comfortable with LGBT political leaders.

The attitude of the Dutch towards lesbians, gays and bisexuals is more open than that towards transgender people. This is also common in other European societies, which is caused by transgender people being less common than the LGB people, and therefore people being more likely to have more LGB friends or acquaintances than transgender friends or acquaintances. In the Netherlands, more than 75% of the interviewees revealed that they had LGB friends and hold a positive stance towards homosexuality while less than 10% of the interviewees revealed that they had transgender friends or acquaintances.

The general view of the Dutch Society towards LGBT is positive and people support and are open to promoting the equalities and freedom of LGBT community.
