= Georges Eekhoud =

Belgian novelist

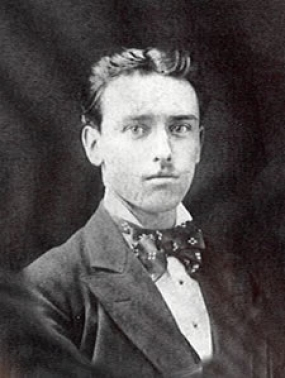
- Georges Eekhoud
- Born: 27 May 1854; Antwerp, Belgium
- Died: 29 May 1927 (aged 73); Schaerbeek, Belgium
- Occupation: novelist

Signature
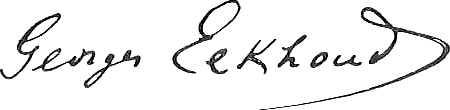

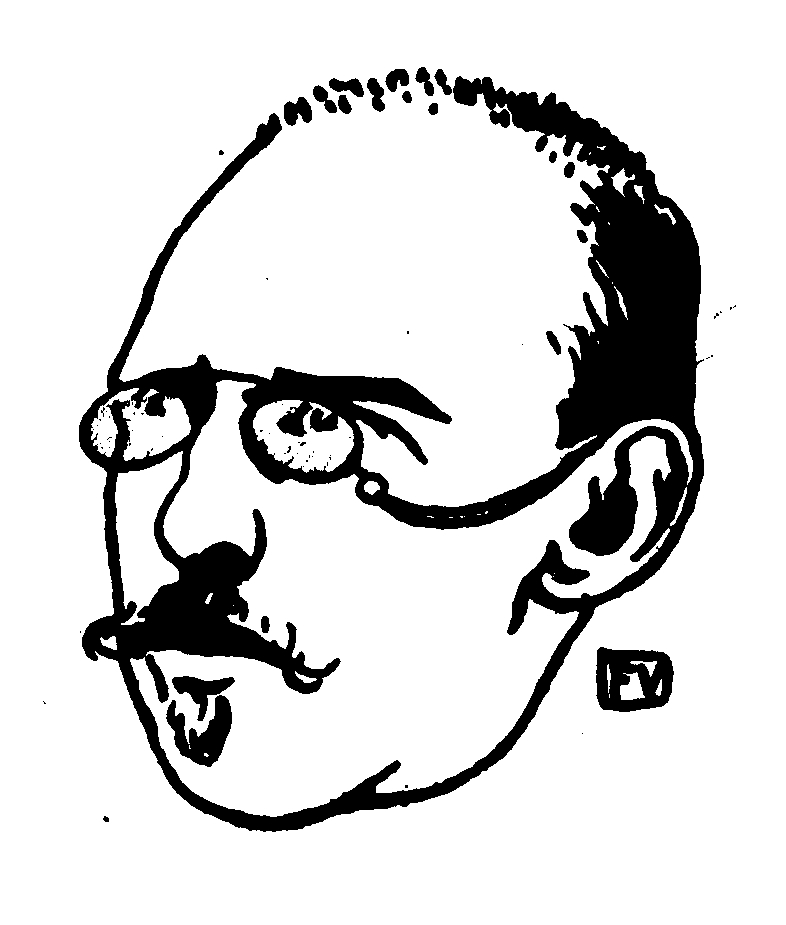
Georges Eekhoud

Georges Eekhoud (27 May 1854 – 29 May 1927) was a Belgian novelist of Flemish descent, but writing in French.

Eekhoud was a regionalist best known for his ability to represent scenes from rural and urban daily life. He tended to portray the dark side of human desire and write about social outcasts and the working classes.

== Early life and works ==
Eekhoud was born in Antwerp. A member of a fairly well-off family, he lost his parents as a young boy. When he came into his own he started working for a journal. First as a corrector, later he contributed a serial. In 1877, the generosity of his grandmother permitted young Eekhoud to publish his first two books, Myrtes et Cyprès and Zigzags poétiques, both volumes of poetry. At the beginning of the 1880s Eekhoud took part in several of the modern French-Belgian artist movements, like Les XX (The Twenty) and La Jeune Belgique (Young Belgium). Kees Doorik, his first novel was published in 1883, about the wild life of a tough young farmhand who committed a murder. The renowned free-thinking publisher Henri Kistemaeckers brought out a second edition three years later. Eekhoud received some guarded praise by famous authors like Edmond de Goncourt and Joris-Karl Huysmans who both sent Eekhoud a personal letter. For his second prose book, Kermesses (Fairs, 1884), not only Goncourt and Huysmans praised him, but also Émile Zola, about whom Eekhoud had written an essay in 1879.

In 1886 his novel Les milices de Saint-François (The Soldiers of Saint Francis Xavier) was published. By now Eekhoud's established subject was the rural Campine, a poor farmers' district east of Antwerp. He had a distinct style permeated with enthusiasm for the roguish young farm labourers and their rough-and-tumble lives. His most famous novel, La nouvelle Carthage (The New Carthage) was published in its definitive form in 1893, and many times reprinted. It has also been translated in English, German, Dutch, Russian, Romanian and Czech. The rustic Campine was in this book replaced with the brutal life of love and death in the Antwerp dockland metropolis and its dirty industry.

Eekhoud published two volumes of short stories: Cycle patibulaire in 1892 (Brussels, Kistemaeckers), reedited in 1896 as Le Cycle patibulaire (Paris, Mercure de France) and in 1895 Mes communions (Brussels, Kistemaeckers), reedited in 1897 (Paris, Mercure de France). Many of these stories contain brazen love stories between men, and Eekhoud even defended Oscar Wilde in "Le Tribunal au chauffoir", first published in the literary periodical L’Art Jeune in September 1895, just a few months after Wilde's conviction, and then in the 1896 edition of Le Cycle patibulaire.

== Escal-Vigor ==
In 1899 Eekhoud offered to his readers a new and daring novel, Escal-Vigor. This is the name of the castle of its protagonist, count Henry de Kehlmark, but it conveys the name 'Escaut', French for the river Scheldt, and 'Vigor', Latin for Power. Many of these readers were shocked, because the book is concerned with love between men. According to Eekhoud's biographer Mirande Lucien, Escal-Vigor was the book of a man who wanted to speak about himself in all freedom. Escal-Vigor is a homogeneous, linear text. The story goes without detours to its final scene of the martyrdom, the moment that the tortured bodies testify of the justness of their cause. As for its composition, Escal-Vigor is the least decadent of Eekhoud's works. Eekhoud makes much less use of the elaborate and old-fashioned words that make the reader stop and wonder.

A clear and resolute novel about homosexuality, Escal-Vigor was heading towards trouble. Although it was well received by most critics, like Rachilde and Eugène Demolder, a lawsuit was launched against it. However, a storm of protest, especially vociferous because of numerous literary celebrities, and a cunning lawyer with literary aspirations, Edmond Picard, did their part in acquitting Eekhoud.

Excal-Vigor was translated and published in English in 1909 under the title Escal-Vigor. A novel from the French of George Eekhoud, with a militant foreword, probably written by Eekhoud himself, or by his publisher Charles Carrington. This translation is subsequently published in the US under the title A Strange Love. A Novel of abnormal passion by Panurge Press in 1930 and in 1965 by Guild Press under the title A Strange Love. Escal-Vigor.

== Eekhoud's later years ==
Later novels and stories, like his 1904 novel L’Autre vue, (Paris, Mercure de France) reedited in 1926 under the title Voyous de velours ou L'autre vue (Brussels, Renaissance du Livre) and Les Libertins d'Anvers ( Antwerp libertines, 1912) also contain notions of queer love or sometimes only hints of admiration for masculinity, e.g. Dernières Kermesses (1920). Eekhoud corresponded with Jacques d'Adelswärd-Fersen and contributed to his sumptuous literary monthly Akademos (1909). He also befriended and influenced young Jacob Israël de Haan, who authored several poems on themes of his older Belgian colleague, especially La Nouvelle Carthage and Les Libertines d'Anvers. Eekhoud for his part wrote the preface of De Haan's sadomasochist novel Pathologieën (Pathologies, 1908). The two authors kept in contact by letter.

Eekhoud continued to be a well-respected author until he put on a firmly pacifistic stance in World War I that ravaged Belgium, after which his star declined. In the twenties his books started to be reprinted again, although he died in 1927 at Schaerbeek.

Eekhoud left a voluminous diary (1895–1927) of some 5000 pages, that has been bought by the Royal Library of Brussels in 1982. Various Belgian libraries contain extensive collections of correspondence.

== Modern interest ==
Nowadays, especially the queer aspect of his works has enjoyed attention. Escal-Vigor has been reprinted in 1982, and Eekhoud's love letters to the journalist Sander Pierron were edited by Mirande Lucien and published in 1993 under the title Mon bien aimé petit Sander. Mirande Lucien also published a biography of Georges Eekhoud: Eekhoud le rauque (1999).

== Works ==
- Myrtes et Cyprès (poetry, 1877)
- Zigzags poétiques (poetry, 1877)
- Kees Doorik (novel, 1883)
- Kermesses (1884)
- Les Milices de Saint-François. (novel, 1886)
- Nouvelles Kermesses.
- La Nouvelle Carthage. (novel, 1888)
- Les Fusillés de Malines.
- Au Siècle de Shakespeare.
- Le Cycle Patibulaire (1892/1896)
- Mes Communions 1895/1897.
- Philaster (tragédie de Beaumont et Fletcher).
- La Duchesse de Malfi (tragédie de John Webster).
- Edouard II (tragédie de Christopher Marlowe).
- Escal-vigor (1899)
- La faneuse d'amour (novel, 2nd edition 1900)
- L'Autre Vue (1904)
- Les Libertins d'Anvers (1912)
- Dernières Kermesses (1920)
- Voyous de Velours ou L'Autre Vue (1991 reissue, Editions Labor)
- Mon bien aimé petit Sander: Lettres de Georges Eekhoud à Sander Pierron, suivies de six lettres de Sander Pierron à Georges Eekhoud (1993).

== See also ==
- LGBT writers in the Dutch-language area

== Sources ==
- Jacob Israël de Haan: Nerveuze Vertellingen with an introduction by Rob Delvigne and Leo Ross. Bert Bakker (1983)
- Georges Eekhoud: Mon bien aimé petit Sander, suivies de six lettres de Sander Pierron à Georges Eekhoud. Lettres de Georges Eekhoud à Sander Pierron (= My much beloved little Sander). Lille, GKC, 1993.
- Mirande Lucien: Eekhoud le rauque (= Eekhoud the hoarse). Villeneuve d'Ascq, Septentrion, 1999.
- Special issue about Georges Eekhoud in the academic journal Textyles in 2020, open access : https://journals.openedition.org/textyles/3801.
