= Andreas Burnier =

Dutch writer (1931–2002)

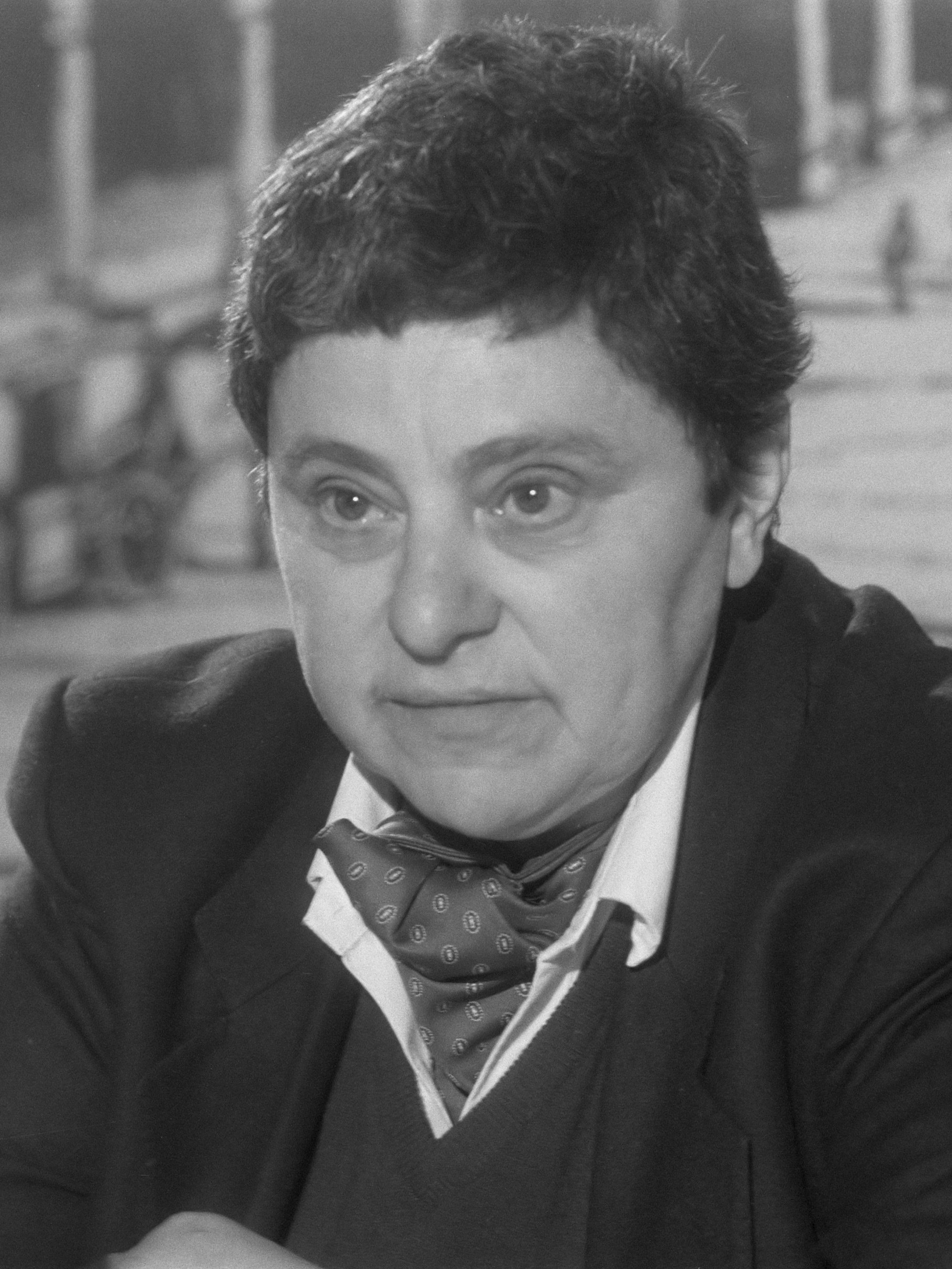
- Born: Catharina Irma Dessaur; 3 July 1931 The Hague, Netherlands
- Died: 18 September 2002 (aged 71) Amsterdam, Netherlands
- Occupation: criminologist writer
- Language: Dutch
- Genre: novel, short stories, essay

Andreas Burnier, born Catharina Irma Dessaur (3 July 1931 – 18 September 2002) was a Dutch writer. Burnier has published poetry, lectures, books and articles, many of which address homosexuality, in order to emphasize women's problems in a male-dominated society.

== Literary debut ==
Burnier debuted in the literary magazine Tirade with her story Verschrikkingen van het Noorden. Along with assuming a new name as a writer, Burnier also assumed the opposite gender. In 1965, she published her first novel, Een tevreden lach (the title of which translates as something like "A Contented Laugh"). In it she wrote about her homosexuality, a topic that had previously not been widely discussed in Dutch literature. She did not mean to publish this novel at first as she wrote it for herself due to the need of reflection, and she deemed it unfit for publication, but after coming into contact with a manager who worked at Querido, who wanted to read it, it became published. Een tevreden lach was well received by critics who praised its original structural elements. The book is considered to be one of the first novels of second-wave feminism as it was about a young woman that lives her own life despite social oppression. She followed this work with a collection of short stories entitled De verschrikkingen van het noorden (1967) and a novel, Het jongensuur (1969), supplementing this work with a series of poetry, book reviews and articles.

In her autobiographical novel Jongensuur (Boys' hour, 1969) Burnier describes the wartime experience of a young Jewish girl in hiding in the Netherlands, and her desire to be a boy.

== Topics of her novels ==
Notable topics Burnier writes about are powerlessness, frustration and anger which she experienced by the masculine-oriented society. This caused her to write and think about herself and if she was a man trapped in a woman's body. The main topic of Het jongensuur is a young girl who wonders if she is not a boy.

A lot of Burnier's novels are autobiographical like her debut novel Een tevreden lach. Her protagonist struggles with her identity as a developing young woman. De wereld is van glas also contains autobiographical fragments. The main character is looking for a person who can help her reconcile with all the different characters she experiences. She finds this reconciliation in Judaism.

After Burnier's father died she reconciled with Judaism and her books were more oriented on this religion. Het jongensuur is the only book from her earlier work which features a Jewish protagonist.

== Feminism and activism ==
Burnier was also a pioneer during the second feminist wave, often writing about the inborn misfortune of having a female body. Many of her works are intended to encourage women to take their place in society and fight for their rights. She thought that it was a privilege to be born as part of a suppressed minority, and in an interview with W.M. Roggeman in 1977 she stated: "To suffer is good for mankind", because it kept her sharp and motivated to change a woman's status in society. Burnier saw feminism as a positive force for remaking civilization. She was an outspoken defender of gay rights and was opposed to abortion and euthanasia. In her argumentation of why she was opposed to abortion, euthanasia and genetic manipulation, she referred to the eugenetics of the Nazi-ideology.

== Personal life ==
Burnier was born Catharina Irma Dessaur in The Hague, The Netherlands to Jewish parents Salomon Dessaur and Rosa Louisa Jacobs. Like many other Jewish children in Europe, she went into hiding during World War II, and was separated from her parents for three years (1942–1945), hiding in sixteen different locations under the alias Ronnie van Dijk. During her time in hiding, Burnier became aware of the lack of rights that women experience in a male-dominated society and began to feel like she was a boy trapped in a girl's body.

After the war, in 1949, Andreas Burnier got her Gymnasium-alpha diploma. She then started to study medicine for one and a half-year at the University of Amsterdam. In her opinion, medicine was fairly superficial and not scientifically interesting, which is why she started to study philosophy. Her university professor did not take her seriously, because she was a young woman. She never finished this as she was twenty-two years old when she decided to quit this study in philosophy.

In 1952, Burnier met Johannes Emanuel Zeijlmans van Emmichoven, because of her contacts at the magazine Castrum Peregrini, where Zeijlmans van Emmichoven was an editor. In 1953, Burnier married Zeijlmans van Emmichoven, and had two children with him. Burnier stated that one of the reasons for marrying him was that "it was something everyone was doing", and that she mistook verbal intimacy, recognition and admiration for something else. After eight years of marriage, in 1961, Burnier and Zeijlmans filed for divorce. In an interview from 1977 she stated that the most vital part of her life was wasted, because she was born as a woman. Her life depended on a man and people only took her seriously after she was thirty, because she was no longer considered a marriageable woman. Burnier says in regards to being a woman: "The older, the better." Afterwards, Burnier decided to start studying again. During the time that Burnier was getting her PhD, Burnier met her first female romantic partner; they were together for 17 years.

She decided to study in Leiden as it was more organized than Amsterdam, and because she simply did not want to return to Amsterdam. For a short period of time, she studied mathematics, but this was too time-consuming as she had multiple jobs on the side, which is why she had to choose a different study. She chose philosophy again, and in 1965 she did her doctoral exam. On 2 July 1971, she graduated cum laude, and received her PhD in criminology. Even before her official graduation she was appointed as a lecturer in criminology at the Catholic University of Nijmegen on 1 July 1971. From 1973 until 1988 Burnier was a criminology professor at the Catholic University of Nijmegen. Prior to this, she worked with the Ministry of CRM and the Institute of Criminal Law and Criminology in Leiden. Beginning in 1983, Burnier had a relationship with Ineke van Mourik. Burnier died unexpectedly in Amsterdam at the age of 71 due to a stroke. She was buried at the Liberaal Joodse Begraafplaats Gan Hasjalom in Hoofddorp.

== Pseudonym ==
Burnier chose a pseudonym, because she wanted to keep her private person strictly separated from her literary person. This was necessary, because she did not want to be known as the author of a possibly controversial book, which could have hurt her academic career. She chose a male pseudonym, because it was easier if she was not seen as a female writer, as female writers were often seen as if they were all the same. Later, when her true identity was revealed, this still happened to her.

She tried to turn her own name in a pseudonym which resulted in the name Andreas. After many failed attempts, she chose a name that was familiar to her. A jeweler's family with the name Burnier lived in The Hague. In addition, one of the streets is called the Burniersstraat, which housed the editorial secretariat of Hollands Maandblad, a literary magazine. This was a magazine Burnier would later publish in.

In an interview with Klaas Pereboom, she stated that she does not have a first name. Officially she is called Catharina Irma, but in the war she was called Ronnie, and in her adolescence she was called Reinier, after a pseudonym she once used, and later people used the name Andreas. She said she had a hard time with the fact that she did not have a real name, but stated that it could not be solved anymore.

== Bibliography ==
=== in Dutch ===
Her works include:

- Een tevreden lach (1965)
- De verschrikkingen van het noorden (1967)
- Het jongensuur (1969)
- De huilende libertijn (1970)
- Poëzie: jongens en het gezelschap van geleerde vrouwen (1974)
- De reis naar Kithira (1976)
- De zwembadmentaliteit (1979)
- Na de laatste keer (1981)
- De droom der rede (1982)
- De litteraire salon (1983)
- De trein naar Tarascon (1986)
- Gesprekken in de nacht (1987)
- Mystiek en magie in de literatuur (1988)
- De achtste scheppingsdag (1990)
- Een wereld van verschil (1994)
- Gustav Meyrink: bewoner van twee werelden (1996)
- Manoeuvres (1996)
- De wereld is van glas (1997)
- Joods lezen (1997)
- Een gevaar dat de ziel in wil (2003)
- Na de laatste keer (2004)

=== in English ===
- Burnier, Andreas (1971). Foundations of theory-formation in criminology; a methodological analysis. The Hague: Mouton. OCLC 209664.
- Burnier, Andreas (1975). Science between culture and counter-culture. Nijmegen: Dekker & Van de Vegt. ISBN 9789025598136. OCLC 1583019.

=== in German ===
- Translation of De verschrikkingen van het noorden (1967):
  - Burnier, Andreas (1968). Die Schrecken des Nordens. Translated by Hillner, Jürgen. Darmstadt: Melzer. OCLC 63306134.
- Translation of Jongensuur (1969):
  - Burnier, Andreas (1993). Knabenzeit. Wagenbachs Taschenbuch, 759 (in German). Translated by Hüsmert, Waltraud. Twenne Verlag, Berlin. ISBN 9783928560085. OCLC 66244237.
  - Burnier, Andreas (2016). Knabenzeit. Wagenbachs Taschenbuch, 759 (in German). Translated by Hüsmert, Waltraud. Verlag Klaus Wagenbach, Berlin. ISBN 9783803127594. OCLC 932029442.
- Translation of Het spirituele in de kunst (1987):
  - Burnier, Andreas (1988). Die Wirklichkeit des Geistigen in der abstrakten Kunst (in German). Translated by Bockemüh, Michael; Blotkamp, Carel. Stuttgart: Freies Geistesleben. ISBN 9783772501005. OCLC 839678799.
- Burnier, Andreas (1994). Rendezvous bei Stella Artois : Roman (in German). Berlin: Twenne-Verl. ISBN 9783928560146. OCLC 68669306.

== See also ==
- LGBT writers in the Dutch-language area
