= Veronique Renard =

Dutch author and visual artist

Veronique Renard (Pantau)
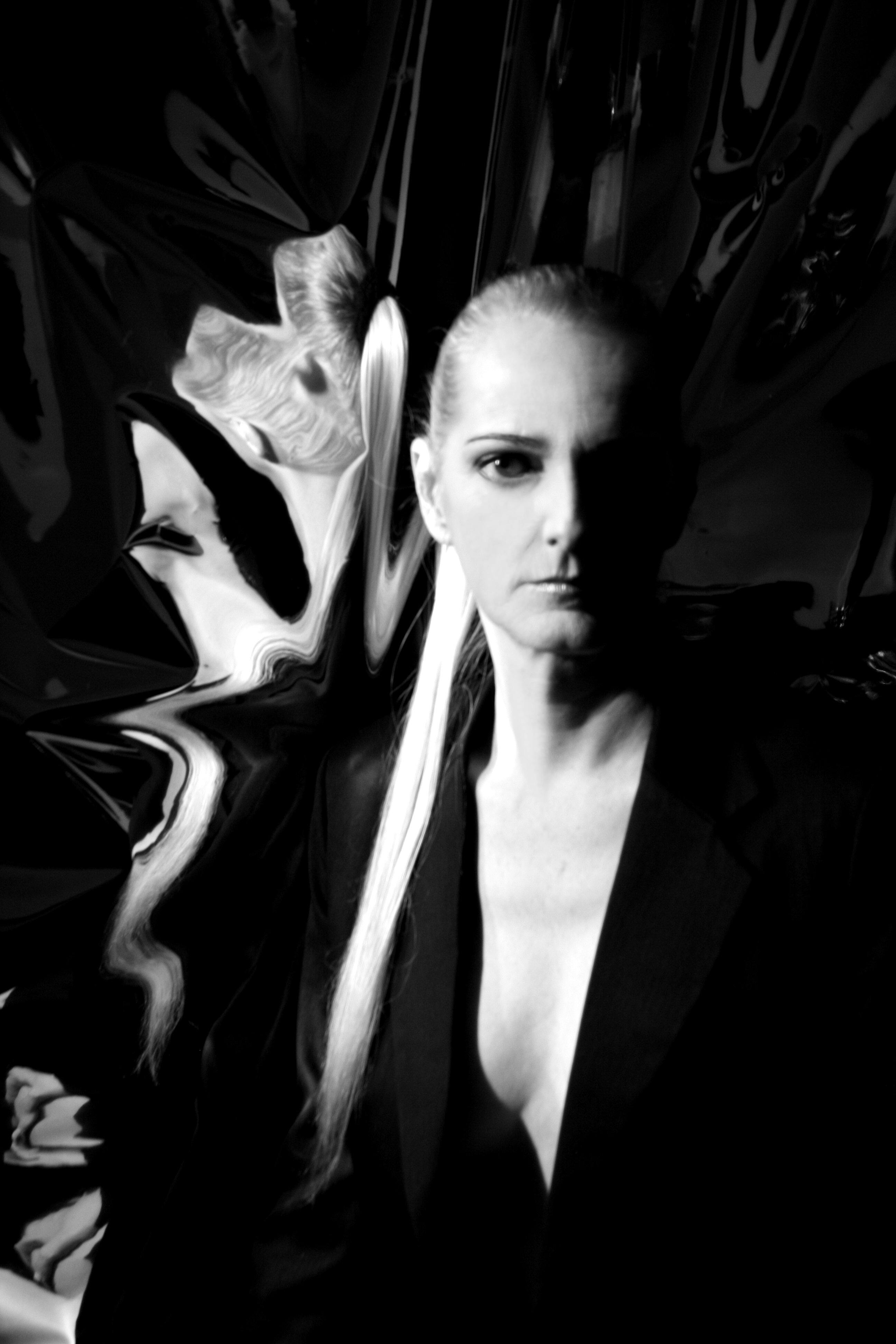
- Born: May 26, 1965 (age 61)
- Occupations: Author and visual artist
- Website: Veronique Renard

Véronique Françoise Caroline Renard (born May 26, 1965, in Jutphaas) is a Dutch author, painter and YouTuber. She is also known as Pantau, a name that was adopted after meeting the Dalai Lama at an audience at his home in McLeodganj, Dharamsala, India in 2000. The name Pantau (also written in Roman as Phentok) means "to be helpful" or "beneficial". Pantao (Chinese: 蟠桃; pinyin: pántáo) is also a Chinese name for a flat, small peach, reputed to be food for Taoist fairies.

== Early life ==
Renard was raised and educated in the Netherlands, and assigned male at birth. She is the daughter of Annie Garda Van Unen (1931–2015), a former senior accountant of the Breda Candy Company FAAM, and Wilhelmus (Wim) Gerardus Renard (1931–2009), a businessman who founded the REACS Company in 1956. Renard is a descendant of the German composer/conductor Paul Albin Stenz who was awarded the Gold Medal of Orange-Nassau by Queen Wilhelmina of the Netherlands. One year prior to his death in 1918 he was naturalized as a Dutch citizen. Renard's grandfather, Johannes (Paul) Renard was a cityscape painter in Rotterdam.

Renard speaks (in order of fluency) Dutch, English, German, French, Thai and Tibetan.

== Gender transition ==
In 1982, at the age of 17, Renard started a gender transition to live as a woman with the support of her family, friends and people in her hometown. Renard's mother renamed her Véronique. In 1983, Renard was granted permission by a court in Utrecht to change her legal name, she added her second name Françoise (after her best friend), and third name Caroline (after Caroline Cossey, an intersex and trans British model who appeared in the 1981 James Bond-film For Your Eyes Only with Roger Moore).

Initially unaware of transgender identities and gender reassignment surgery (GRS), Renard conveyed in her 2007 memoir that the international media attention around Cossey in 1982 regarding her transition helped Renard to self-diagnose her own gender dysphoria. The day after reading about Cossey in a Dutch tabloid, Renard consulted her doctor and shortly after, the Amsterdam Gender Team. Renard was diagnosed with Klinefelter syndrome, having 47 chromosomes with an XXY chromosome trisomy. Renard started feminizing hormone therapy soon after. She completed her physical transition 18 months later in 1984.

Renard was one of the first 150 persons to receive a neovaginoplasty GRS in the Netherlands. Louis Gooren, a professor of endocrinology at the special chair of transsexology at the Free University Amsterdam, guided her through the process. The medical team involved in her GRS included plastic surgeons Auke de Boer and J. Joris Hage as well as gynecologists C. Jager and A. Drogendijk.

In 1984, at age 18, Renard learned from the Amsterdam Gender Team that she was most likely the youngest person in the world to receive a neovaginoplasty. In October 1984, the Dutch Government granted Renard permission to have her gender corrected on her birth certificate. Renard claimed she was probably the first post-operative trans woman in the world to be legally recognized as a female.

In the early 1980s, Louis Gooren put pressure on the Dutch parliament to discuss the option of legal recognition of post-operative trans people in the Netherlands. The Netherlands became one of the first countries in the world to legally and fully recognise post-operative trans people by accepting a new law in 1985.

Fearing rejection and discrimination, Renard never volunteered to mention her trans status to friends, colleagues and lovers.

== Career ==
=== 1982–1999 ===
Renard started her career in 1982 working for a local travel agency. Thereafter she was employed as a management assistant with Philips Electronics and Mercedes Benz. As from 1984 she held various functions with the University of Utrecht. In 1987 she moved to working as the personal assistant of the vice president of Amdahl Netherlands. In 1989 Renard was hired by Amdahl's main competitor IBM. As she felt dissatisfied with IBM's corporate atmosphere, she found new employment with TNT-XP. Renard left the company after 6 months. In 1990, while working as a temp for ExpoConsult, she was contacted by a business partner of ExpoConsult, the US-based publisher Conway Data Inc. The president asked her to set up a European branch office, launch a European edition of their business magazine Site Selection, and represent the organisation at international events. She also functioned as the administrator of Industrial Development Research Council (IDRC) Europe. In 1994 Renard left the company in order to concentrate on her academic studies. She attained a Ph.D. in Dutch Literature in 1997. In 1997 Renard started working as an office manager for Lucent Technologies. Five months later, Renard was informed by one of her colleagues that there were rumours within the organisation regarding Renard's alleged trans status and upcoming lay-off. Renard threatened Lucent to take them to court, accusing them of discrimination. The dispute was settled out of court. Renard's last employment started in January 1999 as an office and relocation manager with Davilex, a fast-growing computer game company which was in the process of building a new head office. Days after Renard successfully completed the company's relocation project, the president asked her to leave the company. Renard received word that the board of directors found out about her being trans. Renard threatened Davilex to take them to court and make a major media hype out of her dismissal. Davilex and Renard's lawyers eventually settled the case out of court.

=== 2000–present ===
In the spring of 2000, Renard moved to the hometown of the exiled Dalai Lama in the Indian Himalayas. There she focused on her activities as a writer and pro-Tibet activist. Concerned with the well-being of the Tibetan people and preservation of Tibetan culture, Renard hopes to create more awareness regarding the Tibetan plight by means of the written word. In 2000 and 2001 she published three books in English, in India and Nepal regarding the Tibetan Freedom Struggle (Pantau in Dharamsala, The Fire of Hell, Pantau in India). A Dutch version of her autobiography Pantau in India has also been published in the Netherlands and Belgium in 2003. In 2006, Pantau in India has also been published in the English in the United States.

In June 2007, Renard published her follow-up memoir, Pholomolo - No Man No Woman. This book focuses on her experiences with gender dysphoria. After living in the Himalayas for nearly seven years, Renard moved to Thailand in October 2006. In November 2009, Renard signed a book deal with the American publisher PD Publishing.

In 2008, Renard started a YouTube channel while living in Bangkok. Initially, the channel had little success, however, this changed when she created a Japanese style zen garden in the Netherlands. In 2013, her videos of her tending to her garden became a hit when they were discovered by a Japanese celebrity who tweeted about them. The channel is called Kikiyaya Zen Gardens and has nearly 19.000 subscribers as of 2026.

== Pantau Foundation ==
In May 2000, Renard established the Pantau Foundation to raise funds and help destitute Tibetan refugee children living in exile in India. Together with her Dharamsala-based spokesperson, Jonathan Blair, and New York-based friends Bobby John Parker Jr. and Sebastian Bond, the foundation supports a growing number of Tibetan children.

== Personal life ==
Renard had numerous romantic relationships, some of which she describes in her memoirs including Malicious Mistake (1985) and Pholomolo - No man No Woman (2007). Several ended when her gender identity as a trans woman was revealed. In 1992, during a business trip to the French Riviera, she met a young British aristocrat residing in Paris, the son of a billionaire. Though deeply in love with each other, the man was forced by his parents to end his relationship with her in order to marry a British lady (aristocrat).

As part of her spiritual journey in the Himalayas, Renard practiced celibacy and abstinence between November 2001 and March 2005. During a vacation in Thailand in the winter of 2005 she started dating a Thai physician of Chinese descent. Renard returned to India three months later but finally decided to immigrate to Thailand. Renard lived in Bangkok for 5 years before she returned to the Netherlands in 2011 to take care of her mother. In 2023 Renard returned to Asia and currently lives in Cambodia.

== Works ==
- Pantau in Dharamsala, (2000) English edition published by Everest Press, New Delhi, India
- The Fire of Hell, by Lobsang Yonten and Veronique Renard (2001), published by Pilgrims Publishers, New Delhi, India
- Pantau in India, (2001), First English edition published by Pilgrims Publishers, New Delhi, India
- Pantau in India, (2003), Dutch edition published by Aspekt Publishers, Soesterberg, The Netherlands
- Pantau in India, (2006), Revised English edition published by IUniverse, Lincoln, New York, Shanghai
- Pholomolo - No man No Woman (2007), English edition published by IUniverse, Lincoln, New York, Shanghai
