= Arnold Aletrino =

Dutch physician, criminal anthropologist and writer

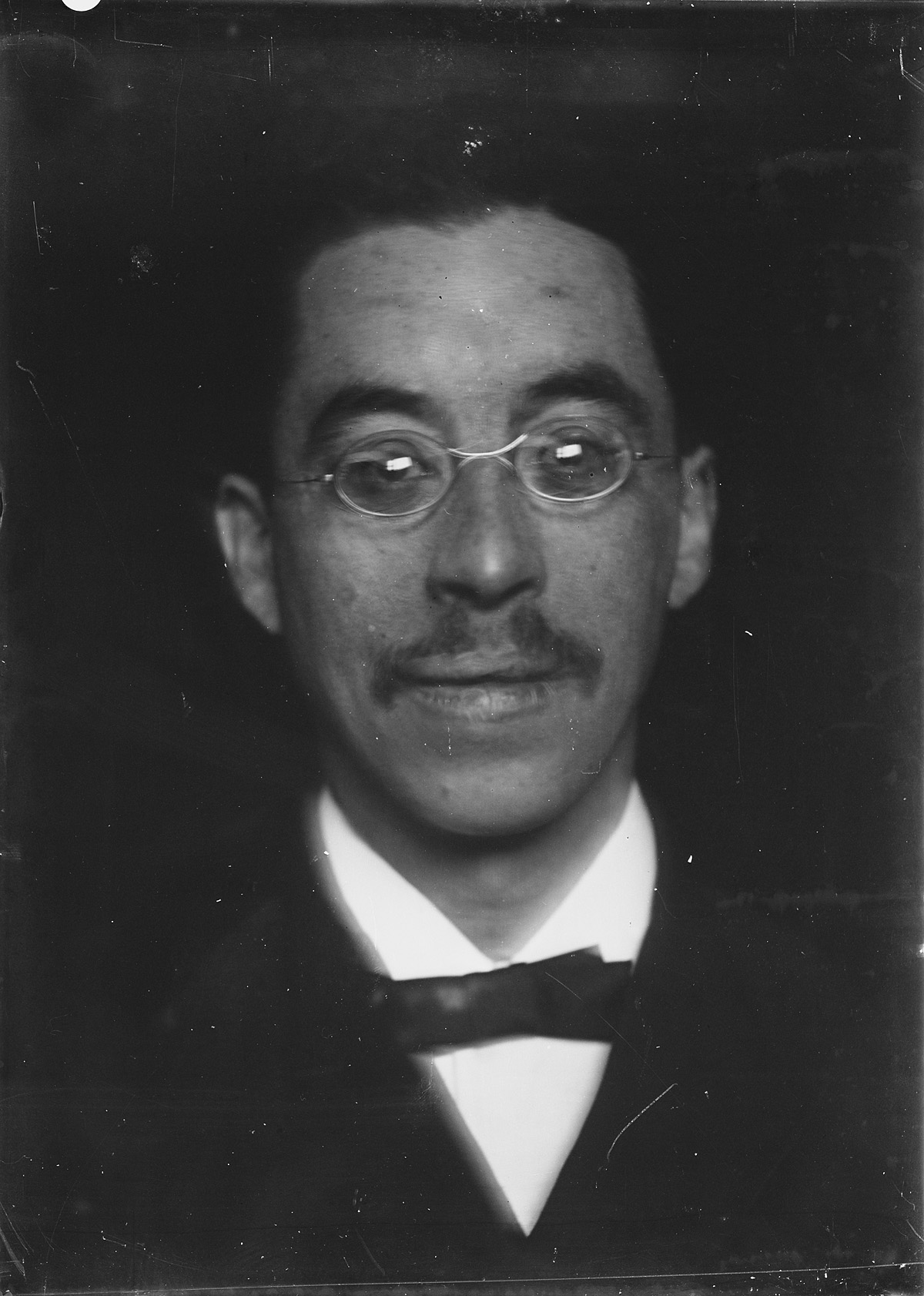
- Aletrino in 1891, photographed by Willem Witsen
- Born: 1 April 1858; Amsterdam, Netherlands
- Died: January 16, 1916 (aged 57); Chernex, Switzerland
- Occupations: Physician; criminal anthropologist; writer
- Known for: Writings on homosexuality

Arnold Aletrino (1 April 1858 – 16 January 1916) was a Dutch physician, criminal anthropologist and writer, who published works on homosexuality in Dutch and French. He was a member of the Tachtigers, a group of young and revolutionary Dutch authors, who despised the pious poetry and prose of the mid-nineteenth century Dutch Victorian writers.

== Biography ==
Arnold Aletrino was born 1 April 1858 in Amsterdam to Salomon Aletrino and Selima Pineda. As a medical student, he befriended Frederik van Eeden, who was to be a well-known psychiatrist and one of the most famous Tachtigers. In 1892, he married Rachel Mendes da Costa, who committed suicide five years later. Later, he married Jupie van Stockum. Aletrino never had children.

Aletrino published between 1889 and 1906 a few novels and collections of stories, all extremely bleak and cheerless in atmosphere. During this time, he worked as a medical doctor for the city of Amsterdam, especially for its firemen.

In his final years, an incurably ill man, he lived with his wife in Switzerland. Aletrino died 16 January 1916 in Chernex, Switzerland, near Geneva, aged 57.

== Works ==
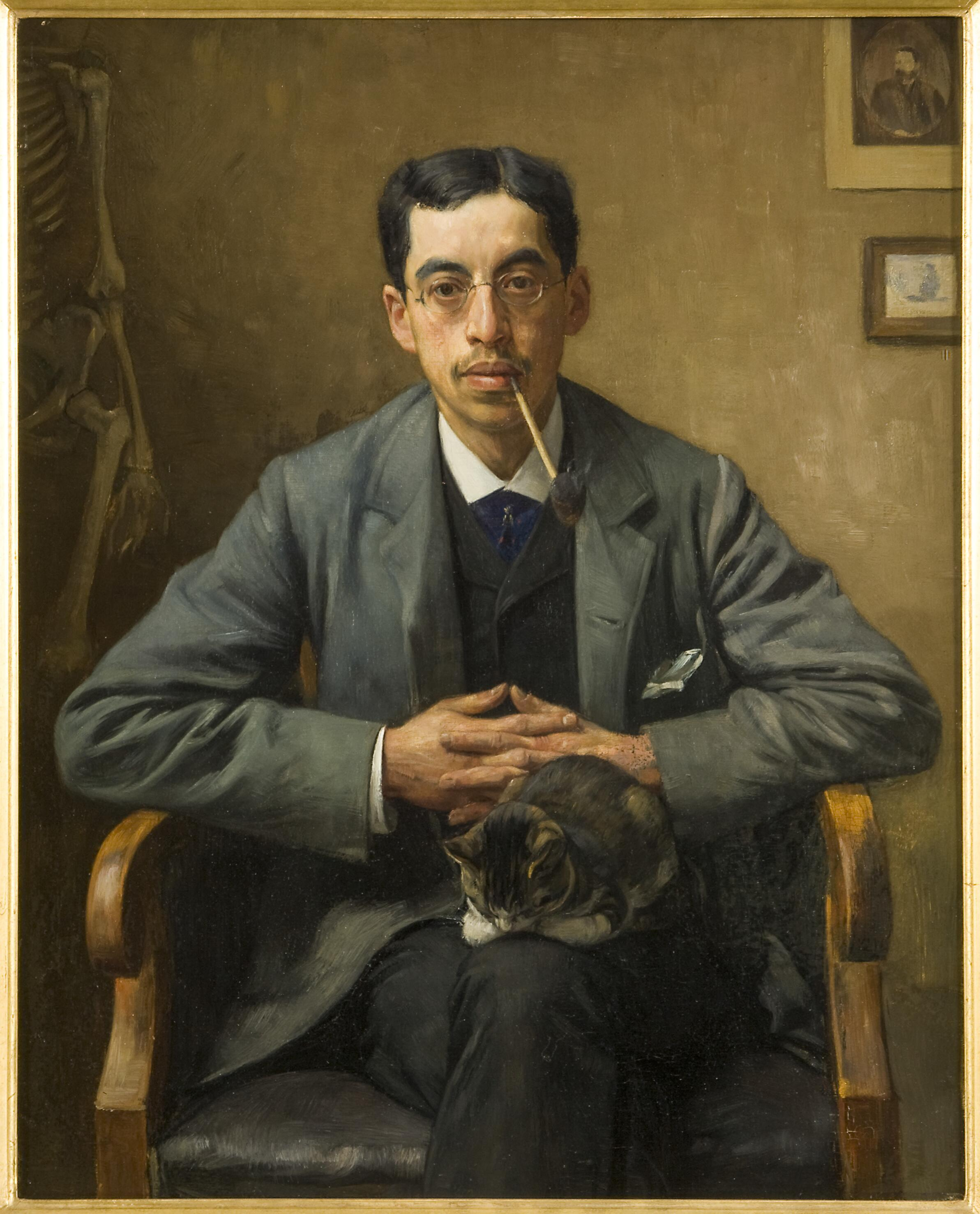
1885 portrait of Aletrino by Jan Veth

Aletrino had been schooled by Cesare Lombroso, who attempted to explain criminality in light of a degenerating central nervous system. Aletrino broke with Lombroso over homosexuals in a Dutch article in 1897, in which he claimed that homosexuality could occur in otherwise perfectly normal and healthy individuals. In later works he campaigned against the legal intolerance and prohibition of homosexuality in Europe.

In 1901, he defended homosexuals at the Fifth Congress of Criminal Anthropology in Amsterdam. He was accused of "defending immorality." He continued to fight throughout his life to engender a more tolerant and understanding attitude of homosexuality. In 1912, he participated in founding the Dutch branch of the Scientific Humanitarian Committee, which was first founded in Germany in 1897 by gay rights pioneer Magnus Hirschfeld.

== Sources ==
- Hekma, Gert. "Aletrino, Arnold". Who's Who in Gay & Lesbian History. From Antiquity to World War II. Robert Aldrich & Garry Wotherspoon (ed.), Routledge, 2001, p. 15.
- Johansson, Warren. "Aletrino, Arnold". Encyclopedia of Homosexuality. Dynes, Wayne R. (ed.), Garland Publishing, 1990, p. 39.
- Joosse, Kees. Arnold Aletrino: pessimist met perspectief. Thomas Rap, 1986. Biography. 612 p.
- Lieshout, Maurice van "Stiefkind der Natuur: Het Homobeeld bij Aletrino en Von Römer", Homojaarboek. 1 (1981), p. 75-106.
- Lieshout, Maurice van "Pendelen tussen wetenschap en moraal. Arnold Aletrino (1858-1916)", Pijlen van naamloze liefde. Pioniers van de homo-emancipatie. Maurice van Lieshout & Hans Hafkamp (ed.), SUA, 1988, p. 83-88.
- Joods Historisch Museum, Arnold Aletrino (Dutch)
